= Damião de Góis =

16th-century Portuguese humanist philosopher (1502–1574)

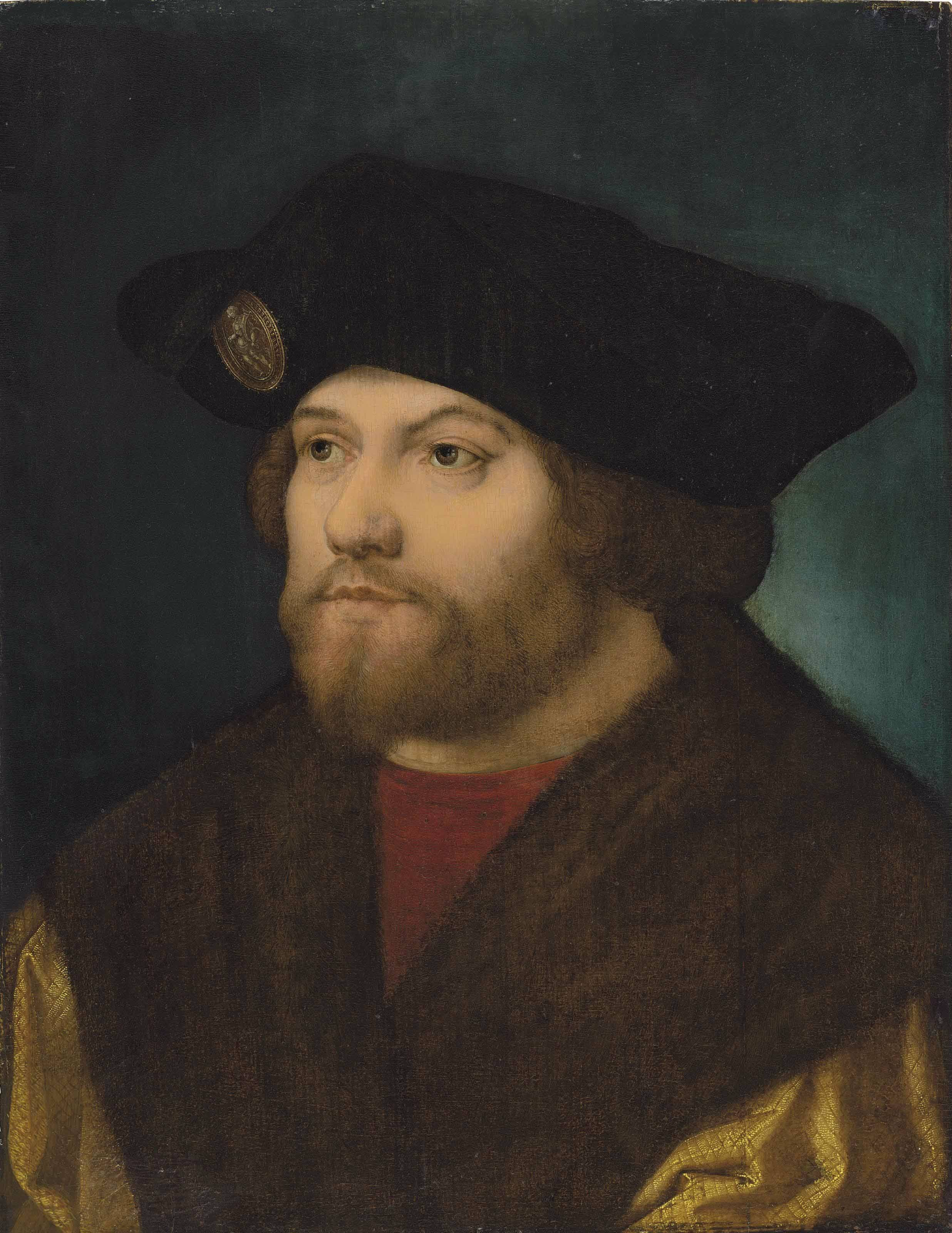
- Portrait of Damião de Góis, 16th century, after an engraving by Albrecht Dürer
- Born: 2 February 1502; Alenquer, Portugal
- Died: 30 January 1574 (aged 71); Alenquer, Portugal
- Occupations: Humanist philosopher, historian, chronicler, archivist, general

Damião de Góis (Portuguese: [dɐmiˈɐ̃w dɨ ˈɣɔjʃ]; February 2, 1502 – January 30, 1574) was a Portuguese diplomat, historian, musician, and humanist philosopher. A friend and student of Erasmus, Góis is considered one of the most influential intellectuals of the Portuguese Renaissance. He was appointed secretary to the Portuguese factory in Antwerp in 1523 by King John III of Portugal. He compiled one of the first accounts on Ethiopian Christianity.

== Biography ==
=== Early life and background ===
Born in Alenquer, Portugal, Góis was the son of Portuguese nobleman Rui Dias de Góis and his fourth wife, Isabel. His mother was a descendant of Flemish merchants who established themselves in Portugal. (Note: "Maerten Lem (great-grandfather of Damião de Góis), a Bruges merchant, arrived in 1450 in Lisbon with a letter of reference from Isabella of Portugal (...)")

At the age of nine, Góis joined the household of King Manuel I of Portugal to act as a page. While he did not receive a formal humanist education, the atmosphere at Portuguese court was intellectually stimulating. Interactions with travellers from foreign lands, such as Ethiopian ambassador Mateus, cultivated his fascination with distant civilizations. Góis was greatly influenced by Manuel I's love for music, learning to play the clavichord, cymbal, and cithren. The King also encouraged his interest in historiography. Góis later described Manuel I as his "maker" and "educator."

=== Diplomatic career ===
In 1523, under Manuel I’s successor, King John III of Portugal, Góis was sent to Antwerp to serve as secretary of the Portuguese feitoria (factory, trading post and commercial office). (Note: Góis was first appointed to the position by Manuel in 1521, but the King's death that same year delayed his departure.) His primary responsibilities as secretary were to champion the King's financial interests and negotiate with officials to protect Portuguese trading privileges. While Góis criticized John III's policies in private, he was publicly a strong advocate for the King. In response to Paolo Giovio's criticism of John III's excessive profits from the spice trade, Góis published a pamphlet titled On Portuguese Matters justifying the King's monopoly on the basis that Portugal was financing exploration and, by extension, the spread of Christianity.

Impressed with Góis's service in Antwerp, John III sent him on a special mission to England in 1528. His task was to assure the English that Portugal, although staunchly Catholic, would remain an ally even amidst religious tension sparked by Henry VIII's efforts to divorce Catherine of Aragon. While in England, Góis befriended John Wallop and may have interacted with Thomas More. Later, in 1529, Góis was assigned to Poland to negotiate the marriage of Infante Luis, John III's brother, to Hedwig Jagiellon, eldest daughter of King Sigismund I the Old. He went to Poland for the same purpose again in 1531, but despite his efforts the union did not materialize. Henceforth, Góis travelled to Denmark, Lübeck, and Russia on diplomatic missions.

Góis was curious about Protestantism and interacted with reformers whenever an opportunity arose. In Lübeck, he discussed the structure of the Lutheran Church with Johann Bugenhagen. Shortly after, he attended a sermon delivered by Martin Luther in Wittenberg. The same day, he dined with Luther and Philip Melanchthon. Góis was put off by Luther, but developed a friendship with Melanchthon. Góis was also interested in learning more about Tatars and, after his official state visit to Russia, briefly explored the Don to interact with isolated tribes.

Deeply interested in theology and history, Góis debated devoting his entire life to scholarship but initially lacked the self-assurance to do so. Johannes Magnus, whom he befriended while visiting Danzig in 1529, was instrumental in encouraging Góis to pursue a humanistic career.

In 1532, Góis enrolled at the University of Louvain and published his first scholarly works, Legation and Admonition. After studying intensely and developing eye strain, he was instructed by his physician to rest and take a trip. Hence, in 1533, Gois travelled to Freiburg and Strasbourg. While in Freiburg, he met Erasmus for the first time. Although the two only had one conversation, Erasmus was impressed with Góis and they began corresponding regularly. Shortly after, Góis journeyed to Portugal and formally resigned from all diplomatic duties.

=== Time with Erasmus ===
In April 1534, Góis was invited by Erasmus to live with him in Freiburg and enthusiastically accepted. In the following months, he received assistance from Erasmus in his studies, particularly in Latin and Greek. Góis also concerned himself with advocating for the acceptance of the Ethiopian Church within the Western Christian community and condemning the oppression of the Sámi people in Sweden, matters he had previously addressed in his publications Legation and Admonition. Góis inspired Erasmus to criticize prejudice towards Ethiopian Christians and poor treatment of the Sámi in his Ecclesiastes: On the Art of Preaching.

After five months of boarding with Erasmus, Góis was pressured by Catholic authorities to leave Freiburg on account of his association with influential Protestants. Erasmus and Góis continued corresponding and nurtured a genuine friendship, evidenced by the unrestrained discussion of personal matters in their letters. Góis attempted to visit Erasmus while the latter was on his deathbed in 1536, but was hindered by an outbreak of hostilities in Basel. In a letter to Bonifacius Amerbach after learning of Erasmus's passing, he wrote, "Neither the death of a parent nor brother has ever saddened me more than the death of our sweetest Erasmus. I have always adored and loved him like a demi-god and I know that I have never done so wrongly."

=== Italy, 1534–1538 ===
Following his withdrawal from Freiburg, Góis considered enrolling at a German university, but instead selected the University of Padua at Erasmus's suggestion. Before embarking for Italy, Góis travelled to Basel to learn more about the Reformation and interacted with Sebastian Münster and Simon Grynaeus. He also visited Geneva to dine with William Farel.

Góis developed a wide network of prominent contacts during his stay in Italy. He was especially influenced by Pietro Bembo and Lazarus Buonamici. (Note: Erasmus teasingly wrote to Góis, "You don't grieve too much for being expelled from Freiburg. Since exchanging Germany for Italy and Erasmus for Bembo and Buonamico, you are happier than Diomedes who changed copper into gold.") They were Ciceronians and motivated Góis to intensify his study of Cicero's writings. In 1536, Góis began a Portuguese translation of Cato maior de senectute by Cicero. The work was completed in 1538. The two men also encouraged Góis's historical studies, especially with regards to Portuguese history.

Góis complained often about the climate in Italy. He suffered from intense headaches that were eased by travel. He made regular trips to Rome and sometimes visited Germany, namely the cities of Augsburg and Nuremberg.

In 1537, Cardinal Jacopo Sadoleto asked Góis to assist him in his efforts to convince Philip Melanchthon to return to the Catholic faith. (Note: Petrus Bechimius of Bohemia, a travel companion of Góis, referred Sadoleto to him.) Góis initially agreed to act as an intermediary, but later withdrew from involvement because of a sudden shift in his attitude towards the Reformation. The change was probably the result of his engagement to Johanna van Hargen, a Dutch noblewoman of strict Catholic background. (Note: Johanna was the sister of Splinter van Hargen, Góis's acquaintance from Louvain that he shared an apartment with in Padua.) Later, during his trial before the Portuguese Inquisition, Góis stated he recanted any doubts concerning his faith while in Padua.

=== Louvain, 1538–1544 ===
Desiring a calmer life, Góis moved back to Louvain, where he married Johanna van Hargen in late 1538 or early 1539. The couple's first son, Manuel, was born in 1540.

Góis re-enrolled at the University of Louvain in June 1539. In the following years, he finished some of his most important humanist works. In 1544, Góis published a volume titled Collected Works that comprised his previous publications, his correspondence with well-known intellectuals, and some poetry composed in his honor.

In July 1542, during the Siege of Perpignan, Góis led a group of students that had enlisted to defend Louvain against French forces commanded by Maarten van Rossum. In August of the same year, he was sent with the mayor of the city, Adrian of Blehen, to negotiate peace. Following France's withdrawal, Góis and Adrian were taken prisoner and brought to Picardy. Authorities in Louvain agreed to pay a ransom to release Adrian but not Góis, who remained imprisoned two months longer and was freed in October 1543 only by the intervention of John III.

Disgruntled with the reluctance of Louvain to aid him during his fourteen-month imprisonment in Picardy, Góis gave an address before representatives of the University detailing his contributions and grievances. Notwithstanding, the representatives declined to express thanks, apologize for Góis's distress, or reimburse the ransom. Feeling discriminated against as a foreigner, Góis appealed to Charles V and the Emperor awarded him with a coat of arms.

Among his many Portuguese acquaintances, Góis was a friend of the writers João de Barros and André de Resende.

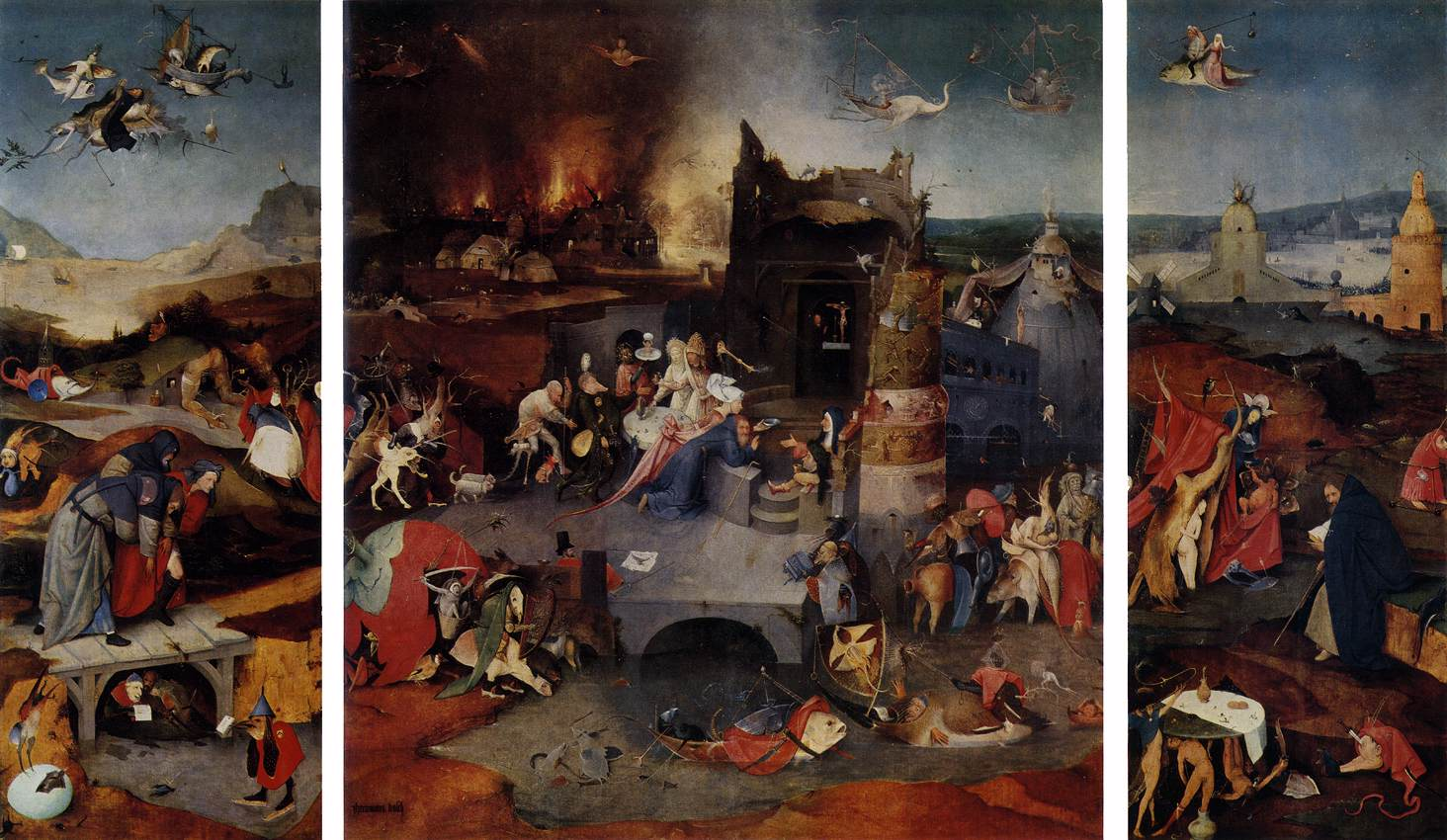
Hieronymus Bosch - Triptych of Temptation of St Anthony

Job Triptych, ca. 1500-1524

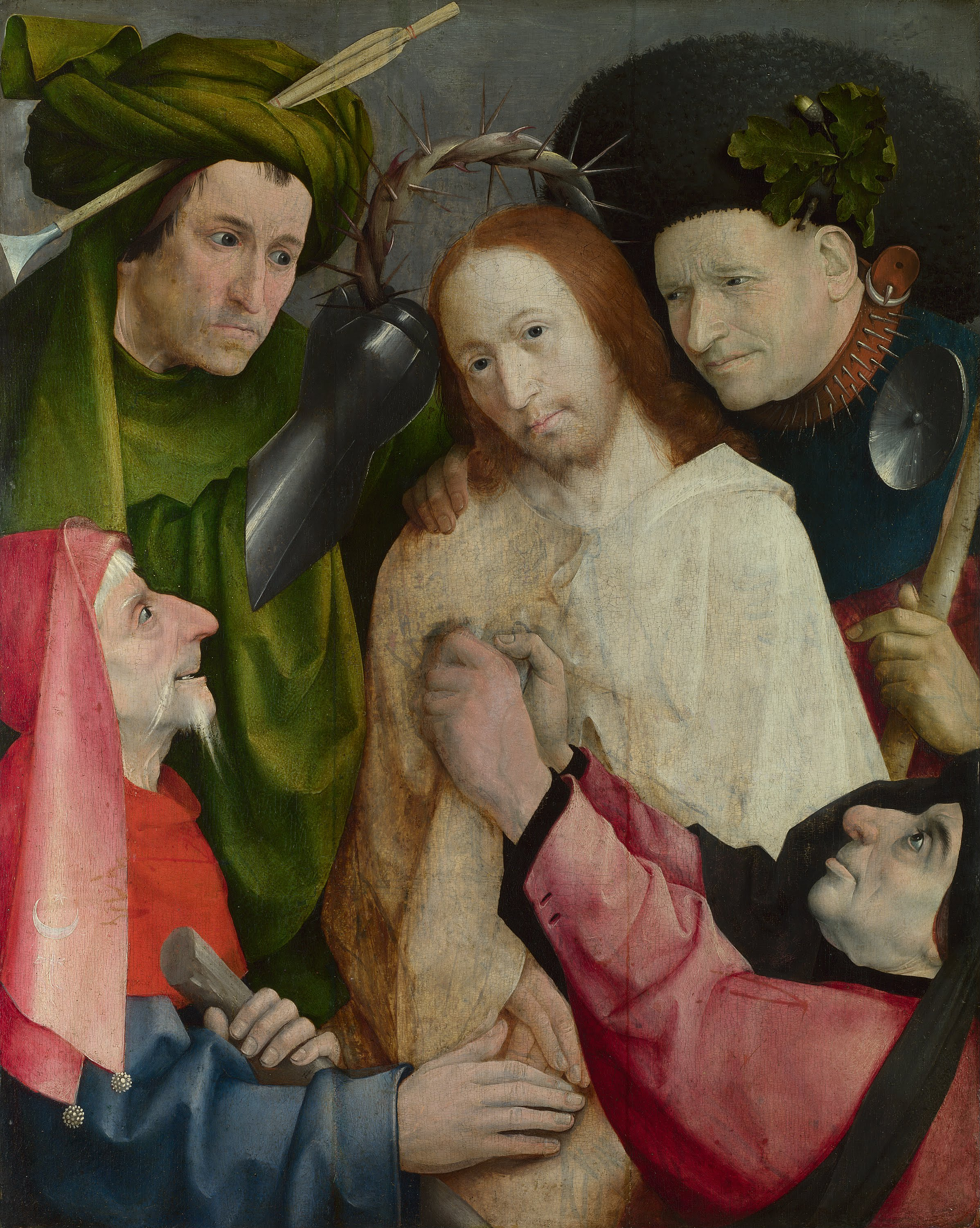
Hieronymus Bosch - Christ Mocked (The Crowning with Thorns) - possible the version owned by de Gois which disconcerted the Inquisition

He was also a composer of some musical pieces and kept a private collection of paintings, including three by Hieronymous Bosch.

Góis translated into Latin a Portuguese opuscule on the Ethiopian embassy of the Armenian Mateus (the representative of the Negus Dawit II) to Portugal (1532), which also included the famous "Letter of Prester John" written by the Ethiopian Queen Eleni (1509) and a "Confessio illorum fidei".

In 1538 he published a translation of the Biblical book Ecclesiastes in Portuguese, though it was not widely circulated. In 1540, he published the famous Fides, religio, moresque Aethiopum ("Ethiopian faith, religion, and mores"). The book received a widespread diffusion in Europe, in both Catholic and Protestant circles, and enjoyed of successive editions (Paris 1541, Leuven 1544, Leiden 1561, Cologne 1574). It also earned the author, however, the criticisms of the powerful Portuguese Cardinal Henry of Portugal, who, as Grand Inquisitor of the Portuguese Inquisition, banned distribution of the second half of the essay in Portugal. The Jesuit order proved equally critical, as he was accused by the Provincial superior Simão Rodrigues of Lutheranism, and of being a disciple of Erasmus, before the Inquisition.

=== Career in Portugal ===
Góis finally returned to Portugal in 1545. He was initially promised a position to serve as tutor to Prince João Manuel, but the offer was rescinded as a result of Góis's denunciation by Simão Rodrigues at the Inquisition High Tribunal. (Note: Years earlier in Padua, Góis openly engaged in theological discussions with Protestants in Rodrigues' presence, triggering a heated argument. Ignatius of Loyola sided with Góis, enraging Rodrigues and causing him to develop an intense dislike for Góis that would persist for decades.)

With no position at court, Góis returned to his native town of Alenquer and devoted his time to writing and studying. He published Damiani Goes equitis Lusitani Urbis Lovaniensis Obsidio, a work detailing his role during the siege of Louvain, in 1546. Despite accusations of heresy, Góis remained in John III's favor. He continued informing the King of his scholarly activities and advising him on economic matters. In 1548, Góis was named Guarda-Mor (High Guardian) of the Torre do Tombo (Royal Archives). Rodrigues tried again in 1550 to initiate proceedings at the High Tribunal against Góis, but was unsuccessful. Following John III's death in 1557, Infante Henrique, regent of the kingdom during the minority of King Sebastian, continued to support Góis and commissioned him to write chronicles of the reigns of John II and Manuel I. Góis also published a description of the city of Lisbon – Urbis Olisiponis Descriptio (1554).

==== Trial and death ====
In 1571, Góis was arrested on charges of heresy and jailed in a monastery. (Note: King Sebastian reached the age of majority in 1568. Unlike his predecessors, Sebastian did not have a personal relationship with Góis and was therefore uninterested in rescuing him from the Inquisition.) Having enjoyed high status and the confidence of the royal family his entire life, Góis suffered in confinement. He was not permitted to have books and instead occupied himself with preparing for his court hearings. On 14 July 1572, Góis wrote a complaint about his physical ailments, including a serious skin condition he feared to be leprosy.

Simão Rodrigues presented much of the damaging evidence against Góis. In addition to bringing attention to Góis's contact with Erasmus and well-known Protestants, Rodrigues testified that during debates in Italy decades prior Góis had expressed skepticism towards Catholic dogmas, like papal infallibility.

Góis was eventually sentenced to loss of property and indefinite confinement at Batalha Monastery. Not much is known about the last years of his life. He died in 1574, possibly in Alenquer.

Góis had seven sons and two daughters with Johanna. He also fathered three illegitimate children.

== Representations ==
- "Melodias estranhas", chamber opera by António Chagas Rosa on a libretto by Gerrit Komrij. 2001.
- 1942 Portugal 500 Escudos banknote
- Wilson-Lee, Edward (2022). A history of water: being an account of a murder, an epic and two visions of global history. London: William Collins. ISBN 9780008358228.

== Writings ==
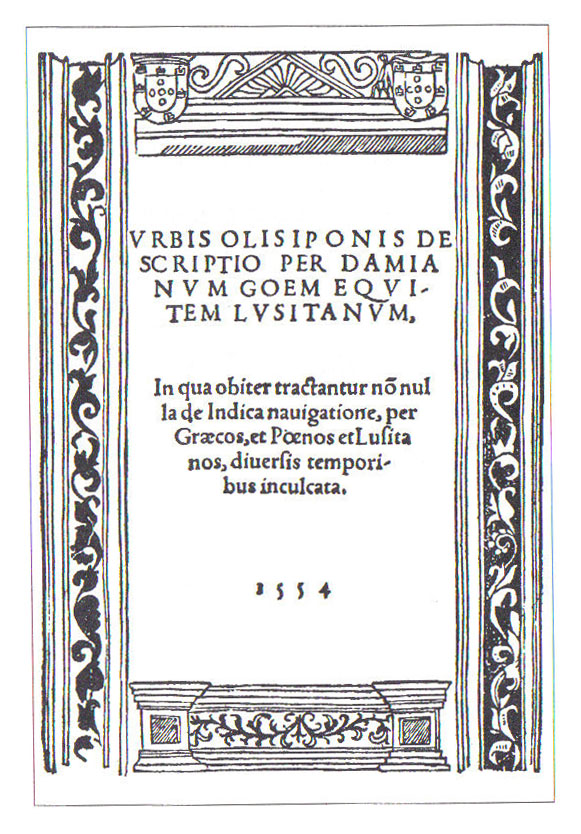
Title page of Urbis Olisiponis descriptio [1554]

- Legatio Magni Indorum Imperatoris Presbyteri Ioannis ... (Antwerp 1532; new ed. in: Elizabeth B. Blackburn, “The Legacy of ‘Prester John’”, Moreana 4, 1967, 37–98)
- Ecclesiastes de Salamam, com algũas annotações neçessarias (Venezia, 1538; new ed. by T. F. Earle, O Livro de Ecclesiastes, Lisboa, 2002)
- Livro de Marco Tullio Ciçeram chamado Catam maior, ou da velhiçe, dedicado a Tito Pomponio Attico (Venezia, 1538)
- Fides, religio, moresque Aethiopum ... (Lovanii 1540; Parisiis ²1541; German tr. Wiesbaden 1999)
- Deploratio Lappianae gentis (Lovanii 1540)
- Urbis Olisiponis descriptio (Évora, 1554; Frankfurt, 1603; Coimbra, 1791; Eng. tr. New York, 1996)
- Crónica do Felicíssimo Rei D. Manuel (Lisboa 1566–67; ²1619; Coimbra 1926)
- Crónica do Principe D. João (Lisboa, 1567; new ed. by Graça Almeida Rodrigues, Lisboa, 1977)
- As cartas Latinas de Damião de Góis, ed. by Amadeu Torres, in Noese e crise na epistolografia Latina goisiana (Paris, 1982)
