= Sapateiro =

Sapateiro is a Portuguese language occupational surname literally meaning "shoemaker". Notable people with the surname include:

- Fábio Alexandre Martins Sapateiro, Portuguese footballer
- José Sapateiro, Portuguese traveler of the fifteenth century
- Chico Sapateiro, a nickname of Francisco Miguel Duarte, Portuguese writer
