= Prester John (disambiguation) =

Prester John is a Christian king in medieval legend.

Prester John may also refer to:

- Prester John (novel), 1910 novel by John Buchan
- Prester John (comics), a Marvel Comics character based on the legend
- Prester Jon, a DC Comics character
- Prester John, the king of Osten Ard in the 1988–1993 trilogy Memory, Sorrow, and Thorn by Tad Williams
- Prester John, a song by Animal Collective, from the 2022 album Time Skiffs

== See also ==
- John the Presbyter, an early Christian figure
