= Pêro da Covilhã =

15th/16th-century Portuguese explorer and diplomat

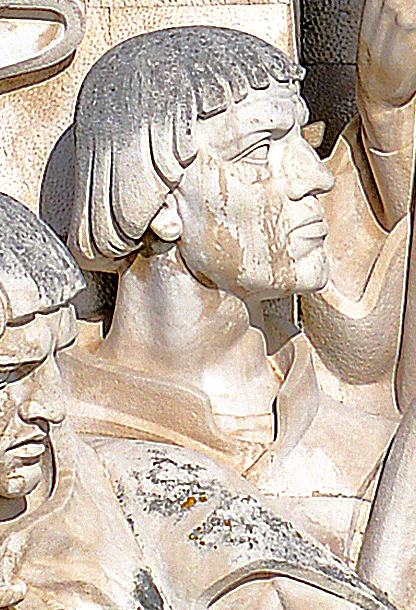
- Effigy of Pero da Covilhã in the Monument of the Discoveries, in Lisbon, Portugal
- Born: c. 1460; Covilhã, Kingdom of Portugal
- Died: After 1526; Ethiopia
- Occupations: Explorer, spy, diplomat
- Known for: Explorations in the Near East and the adjoining regions of Asia and Africa.

Pêro da Covilhã (Portuguese pronunciation: [ˈpeɾu ðɐ kuviˈʎɐ̃]; c. 1460 – after 1526), sometimes written Pero de Covilhã, was a Portuguese diplomat and explorer.

He was a native of Covilhã in Beira. In his early life he had gone to Castile and entered the service of Don Juan de Guzmán, brother of Enrique de Guzmán, 2nd Duke of Medina Sidonia. Later, when war broke out between Castile and Portugal, he returned to his own country, and attached himself, first as a groom, then as a squire, to Afonso V of Portugal and his successor John II of Portugal. In 1487, his overland expedition made its way to India, exploring trade opportunities with the Indians and Arabs, and winding up finally in Ethiopia. His detailed report was eagerly read in Lisbon, as Portugal became the world's best informed center for global geography and trade routes.

== Mission to the East ==
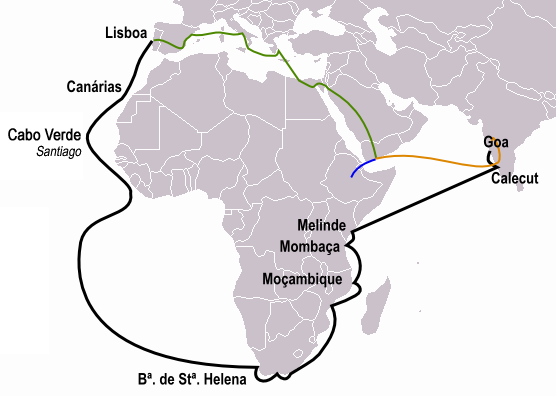
Joint overland route to Aden, 1487 Covilhã's voyage to India, 1489 Paiva's voyage to Ethiopia, 1490 Da Gama's expedition to India, 1497

Covilhã was an adventurer of low birth but an adept swordsman and loyal servant to the Portuguese Crown. His fluency in Arabic and Castilian allowed him to perform undercover operations in Spain as well as undertaking secret negotiations in Morocco on behalf of King John II of Portugal. These successful exploits prodded the King to send him and Afonso de Paiva to undertake a mission of exploration in the Near East and the adjoining regions of Asia and Africa, with the special assignment to learn where cinnamon and other spices could be found, as well as of discovering the land of legendary Prester John, by overland routes. Bartolomeu Dias, at the same time, went by sea to find the Prester's country, as well as the termination of the African continent and the ocean route to India.

The expedition started at Santarém, on May 7, 1487. Covilhã and Paiva were briefed by the Bishop of Tangiers and two Jewish mathematicians, Rodrigo and Moisés, who were prominent members of the commission which advised the Portuguese government to reject the proposals of Christopher Columbus. The explorers were presented with a "letter of credence for all the countries of the world" and a navigational map of the Middle East and Indian Ocean, likely drawn from the cartographical work of Fra Mauro. From Santarém they travelled by Barcelona to Naples, where their bills of exchange were paid by the sons of Cosimo de' Medici. Next, they went to Rhodes and acquired a stock of honey so they could portray themselves as merchants while traveling in the Arab world. Afterwards, they sailed to Alexandria.

Following a fever that struck both men, the two explorers took a boat up the Nile to Cairo and later a caravan across the desert to the ports of El-Tor and Suakin. They sailed across the Red Sea to Aden where, as it was now the monsoon, they parted. Covilhã proceeded to India and Paiva to Ethiopia. They agreed to meet again in Cairo at a later date.

Covilhã caught a trading dhow across the Indian Ocean to Calicut, the hub of the spice trade. By 1488, he was in Goa and later sailed north to Ormuz at the mouth of the Persian Gulf, another hub of the Indian Ocean. This reconnaissance allowed Covilhã to collect and record information about sailing routes, winds, currents, ports and politics. From Ormuz, he sailed down the east coast of Africa and eventually to Sofala, the farthest point of Arab navigation in the southern Indian Ocean. At Sofala, Covilhã investigated the feasibility of rounding Africa by sea and how best to navigate its east coast. By 1491, he had returned to Cairo, having successfully scouted the major trade routes of the Indian Ocean.

Back in Cairo he learnt that Paiva had died, somewhere on the way to Ethiopia. Meanwhile, King John II of Portugal had sent two Portuguese Jews: Rabbi Abraham of Beja and José Sapateiro, a shoe-maker of Lamego with letters for Covilhã and Paiva outlining further instructions. The King ordered that both men return to Lisbon but not before that "had seen and found out about the great King Prester John". Through José Sapateiro, Covilhã replied with an account of his Indian and African journeys, and of his observations on the cinnamon, black pepper and clove trade at Calicut, together with advice as to the ocean way to India. He recommended that the Portuguese should sail south along the coast of Africa and the seas of Guinea. The first objective in the eastern ocean, he added, was Madagascar; from this island one could reach Calicut.

== Ethiopia ==
With this information José returned to Portugal, while Covilhã, with Abraham of Beja, again visited Aden and Ormuz. At the latter he left the rabbi; and visited Jeddah, the principal port of Arabia, and penetrated (as he told Francisco Álvares many years later) even to Mecca and Medina. Finally, via Mount Sinai, El-Tor and across the Red Sea, he reached Zeila, where he struck inland to the court of Prester John (Ethiopia).

Here he was honorably received by the Emperor Eskender; lands and lordships were bestowed upon him, but Eskender refused to grant him permission to leave, and his successors evaded granting Covilhã permission. According to James Bruce, Covilhã maintained a correspondence with the king in Portugal, describing Ethiopia as "very populous, full of cities both powerful and rich".

In 1507, he was joined by João Gomes, a priest sent by Tristão da Cunha, who had reached Ethiopia by way of Socotra. When the Portuguese embassy under Rodrigo de Lima, which included Ethiopian ambassador Mateus and missionary Francisco Álvares, entered Ethiopia in 1520, Covilhã wept with joy at the sight of his fellow-countrymen. It was then forty years since he had left Portugal and over thirty since he had been a prisoner of state in Ethiopia. Álvares, who professed to know him well, and to have heard the story of his life, both in confession and out of it, praises his power of vivid description as if things were present before him, and his extraordinary knowledge of all the spoken languages of Christians, Muslims and Gentiles. His services as an interpreter were valuable to Rodrigo de Lima's embassy. Covilhã was well treated but was not allowed to leave the country for the rest of his life.

== Legacy ==
Covilhã's extensive travels in the medieval world saw him visit the modern day states of Spain, Morocco, Italy, Greece, Egypt, Sudan, Yemen, Saudi Arabia, India, Mozambique, Iran, Eritrea and Ethiopia. These journeys, together with the maritime achievements of Bartolomeu Dias, were instrumental in paving the way for subsequent Portuguese expeditions, most significantly the Portuguese discovery of the sea route to India by Vasco da Gama in 1497.

Covilhã's arrival in Ethiopia also marked the beginning of Portuguese-Ethiopian relations which culminated in the formal invitation for the Portuguese to interfere directly in the affairs of Abyssinia in the Ethiopian–Adal War of 1541. The sustained Portuguese presence in Ethiopia also led to the influx of Jesuit missionaries into the country although their success at converting the population to Catholicism was mixed. From their base in the city of Fremona, the Jesuits were able to convert the Ethiopian Emperors Za Dengel and Susenyos I to the faith in the 17th century but this resulted in a series of devastating rebellions and revolts against Catholic rule. Following the abdication of Susenyos I in favor of his son Fasilides in 1631, the Jesuits were expelled from the country resulting in several centuries of little to no contact between Ethiopia and Europe.
