= José Sapateiro =

José Sapateiro born in Lamego, Kingdom of Portugal, was a Portuguese traveler of the fifteenth century.

After a sojourn in Baghdad, he returned to Lisbon to present a report to King João II on Ormuz, the emporium of the East-Indian spice trade. He thereupon, by the king's orders, set out in company with the experienced linguist, Abraham of Beja in search of the roving explorer Pêro da Covilhã, in order to interview the latter in the king's behalf as to the results of his travels.

After obtaining valuable information regarding the discovery of the sea route to India from Covilhã, who had previously gathered it from Arabian and Indian pilots, José was sent home by caravan to Aleppo.
