= Armenians in Ethiopia =

Armenian community in Ethiopia

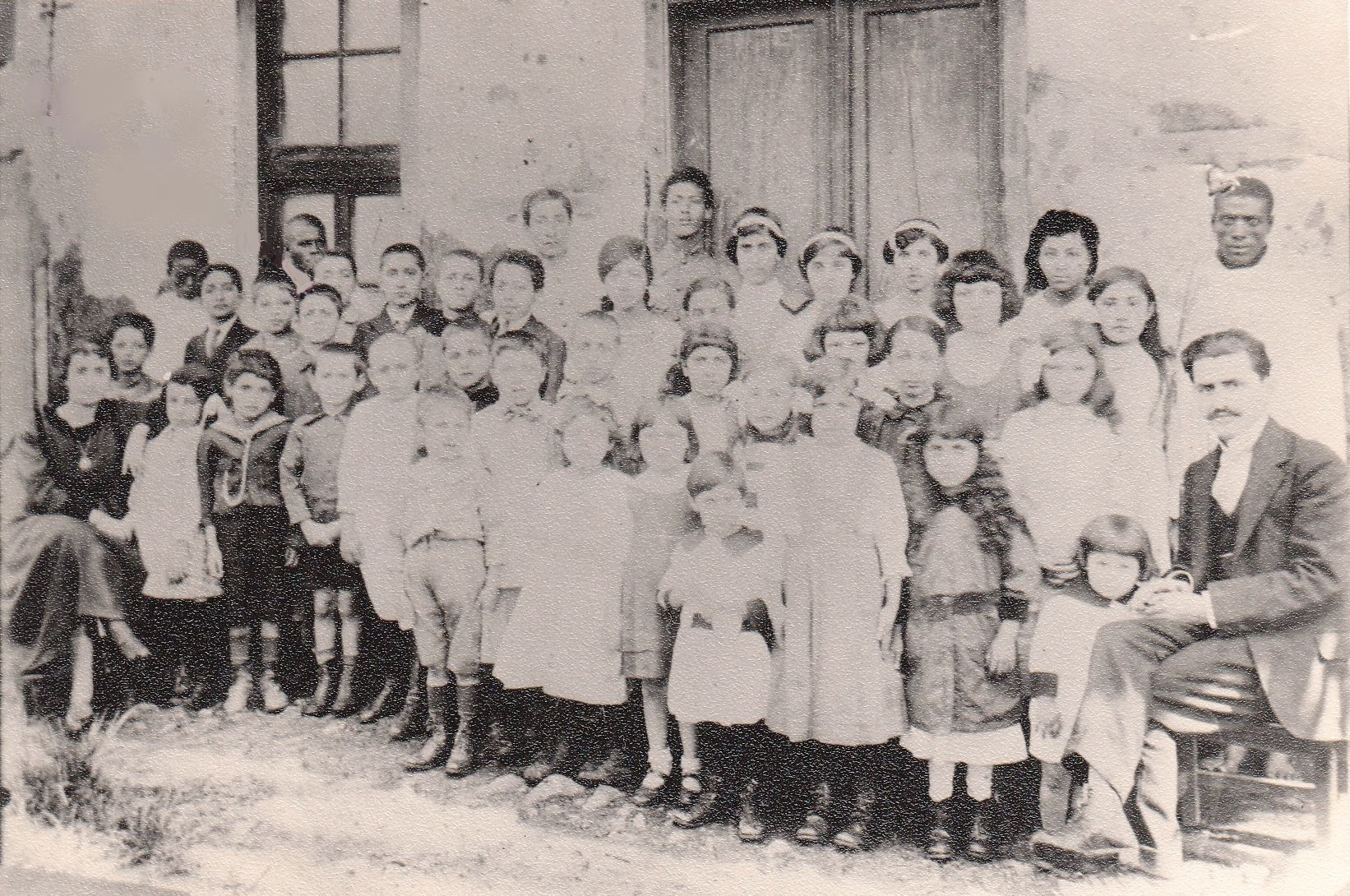
- Addis Ababa Armenian school students in 1918, teachers Mari and Vaghinak Bekaryan

Total population
- 800

Regions with significant populations
- Addis Ababa and Harar

Languages
- Armenian, Amharic.

Religion
- Armenian Apostolic Church

Related ethnic groups
- Armenian diaspora

There is a very small community of Armenians in Ethiopia, primarily in the Ethiopian capital Addis Ababa. Armenians had traded with Ethiopia as far back as the first century AD.

== Religion ==
The Armenian presence in Ethiopia is historic. On a religious basis, the Ethiopian Church and the Armenian Apostolic Church are both members of the Oriental Orthodox communion of churches alongside Coptic Orthodox, Syriac Orthodox, Ethiopian/Eritrean Orthodox and Malankara Orthodox Syrian Church (India) churches.

The Armenian inhabitants in Ethiopia are Armenian Apostolics (Orthodox Armenians) belonging to the Armenian Apostolic Church. The Armenian Apostolic (Orthodox) have their own church, Sourp Kevork (St. George) Armenian Apostolic Church in Addis Ababa. The first-ever pastor of the Armenian community was Rev. Hovhannes Guevherian.

== History ==
Armenians had traded with Ethiopia from as early as the first century AD.

Armenians have a very old presence in Ethiopia. One of the first recorded diplomatic missions to Europe from Ethiopia was led by Matthew the Armenian who traveled to Portugal and Rome at the request of the Dowager Empress Eleni of Ethiopia to appeal for aid against Islamic incursions into Ethiopia in the early 16th century.

Besides the obvious religious affiliation, there is also the story of the "Arba Lijoch" children coming to Ethiopia after the Armenian genocide. Arba Lijoch were a group of 40 Armenian orphans who had escaped from the atrocities in Ottoman Empire, and were afterwards adopted by Haile Selassie I of Ethiopia, then Crown Prince Ras Tafari. He had met them while visiting the Armenian monastery in Jerusalem. They impressed him so much that he obtained permission from the Armenian Patriarchate of Jerusalem to adopt and bring them to Ethiopia, where he then arranged for them to receive musical instruction.

The Arba Lijoch arrived in Addis Ababa in 1924, and along with their bandleader Kevork Nalbandian became the first official orchestra of the nation. Nalbandian also composed the music for Ethiopia Hoy (words by Yoftehé Negusé), which was the Imperial National Anthem from 1930 to 1974.

Haig Patapan's 1930 book about the Armenians in Ethiopia details a number of occupations Armenians were involved in. The occupations he recorded with the most Armenians were shoe cobblers, chauffeurs, jewelers, carpenters, blacksmiths, mechanics and tailors.

The Armenian population peaked shortly before the Italian invasion in 1935 at around 2,800. By the fall of the Ethiopian monarchy in 1974, it was around 2,000, after which the numbers fell significantly.
