= Francisco Álvares =

16th century Portuguese missionary and explorer

- Born: c. 1465; Coimbra, Kingdom of Portugal
- Died: 1536-1541; Rome, Papal States
- Occupations: Missionary, explorer

Francisco Álvares (c. 1465 – 1536–1541) was a Portuguese missionary and explorer to Ethiopia.

Álvarez lived most of his life in Coimbra, Portugal. In 1515 he traveled to Ethiopia as part of the Portuguese embassy to emperor Lebna Dengel accompanied by returning Ethiopian ambassador Matheus. The embassy arrived only in 1520 to Ethiopia where he joined long sought Portuguese envoy Pêro da Covilhã. There he remained six years, returning to Lisbon in 1526–27. He wrote a report entitled Verdadeira Informação das Terras do Preste João das Índias ("A True Relation of the Lands of Prester John of the Indies") about his time in Ethiopia.

== 1515 embassy to Ethiopia ==
Francisco Álvares was a chaplain-priest and almoner to King Manuel I of Portugal. He was sent in 1515 as part of the Portuguese embassy to the nəgusä nägäst (Emperor of Ethiopia), accompanied by the Ethiopian ambassador Matheus. Their first attempt to reach the port of Massawa failed due to the actions of Lopo Soares de Albergaria, governor of Portuguese India, which got no closer than the Dahlak Archipelago and was aborted with the death of the Portuguese ambassador, Duarte Galvão at Kamaran. Álvares and Mattheus were forced to wait until the arrival of Soares' replacement, Diogo Lopes de Sequeira, who successfully sent the embassy on, with Dom Rodrigo de Lima replacing Duarte Galvão. The party at last reached Massawa on April 9, 1520, and reached the court of Lebna Dengel where he befriended several Europeans who had gained the favor of the Emperor, which included Pêro da Covilhã and Nicolao Branceleon. Father Álvares remained six years in Ethiopia, returning to Lisbon in 1527.

In 1533 he was allowed to accompany Dom Martinho de Portugal to Rome on an embassy to Pope Clement VII, to whom Father Álvares delivered the letter Lebna Dengel had written to the Pope.

The precise date of Francisco Álvares death, like that of his birth, is unknown, but according to the Encyclopædia Britannica Eleventh Edition, it was later than 1540, in which year an account of his travels were published at Lisbon. In the introduction of their mid 20th century translation of Álvares' work, C.F. Beckingham and G.W.B. Huntingford furnish evidence that points to Álvares' death in Rome, and admit that he may have died before his work was published.

== Álvares' writings ==
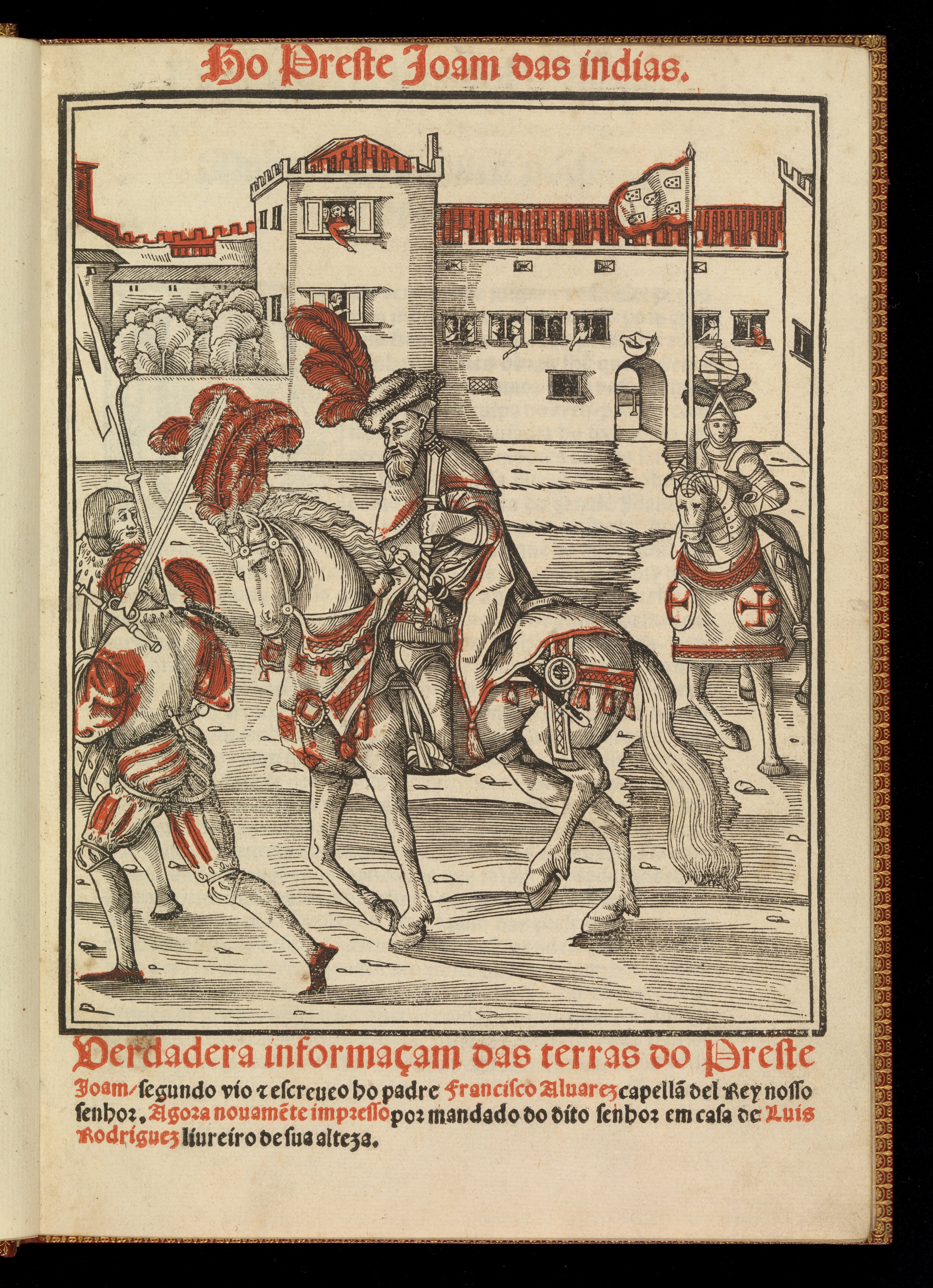
Verdadeira Informação das Terras do Preste João das Indias, 1540

In 1540, Luís Rodrigues published a version of Álvares account in a one volume folio, entitled Verdadeira Informação das Terras do Preste João das Indias ("A True Relation of the Lands of Prester John of the Indies"). C.F. Beckingham and G.W.B. Huntingford cite evidence, based in part on the earlier work of Professor Roberto Almagia, showing that Rodrigues's publication is only a part of Álvares's entire account. Another version of what Álvares wrote was included in an anthology of travel narratives, Navigationi et Viaggi (1550) assembled and published by Giovanni Battista Ramusio. Almagia also identified three manuscripts in the Vatican Library which contain versions of excerpts from the original manuscript.

Francisco Álvares' work has been translated into English at least twice. The first time was the work of Henry Stanley, 3rd Baron Stanley of Alderley, for the Hakluyt Society in 1881. This translation was revised and augmented with notes by C. F. Beckingham and G. W. B. Huntingford, The Prester John of the Indies (Cambridge: Hakluyt Society, 1961).

The author of the 1911 Encyclopædia Britannica article was critical of Álvares' information, believing it should "be received with caution, as the author is prone to exaggerate, and does not confine himself to what came within his own observation." Beckingham and Huntingford, however, have a higher opinion of Álvares' testimony, stating that not only is it "incomparably more detailed than any earlier account of Ethiopia that has survived; it is also a very important source for Ethiopian history, for it was written just before the country was devastated by the [...] invasions of the second quarter of the sixteenth century." He provides the first recorded and detailed descriptions of Axum and Lalibela. They continue:

"He is sometimes wrong, but very rarely silly or incredible. He made a few mistakes; he may well have made others that we cannot detect because he is our sole authority; when he tried to describe buildings his command of language was usually inadequate; he is often confused and obscure, though this may be as much his printer's fault as his own; his prose is frequently difficult to read and painful to translate; but he seems to us to be free from the dishonesty of the traveller who tries to exaggerate his own knowledge, importance, or courage".
