= Prester John (novel) =

1910 adventure novel by John Buchan

- First edition 1910
- Author: John Buchan
- Language: English
- Genre: Thriller
- Set in: Scotland, South Africa
- Publisher: T Nelson & Sons
- Publication date: 1910
- Media type: Print
- Pages: 376

First US edition

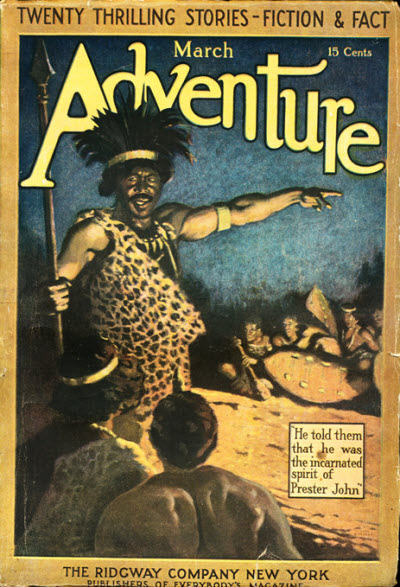
1911 cover of Adventure magazine in which the story was serialised in the US

Prester John is a 1910 adventure novel by the Scottish author John Buchan. It tells the story of the young Scotsman David Crawfurd and his adventures in South Africa, where a native uprising under the charismatic black minister John Laputa is tied to the medieval legend of Prester John.

== Plot ==
The novel's narrator, David Crawfurd, grows up in the Scottish seaside town of Kirkcaple where, as a boy, he first encounters the Reverend John Laputa, a powerfully eloquent black minister of the kirk. One Sunday, Crawfurd and his friends disturb Laputa performing some sort of ritual around a fire on a deserted beach. Angered, Laputa chases the boys but they escape.

When Crawfurd is nineteen, his father dies and he is forced to break off his studies in Edinburgh to earn a living. His uncle finds a post for him as assistant storekeeper in the remote South African village of Blaauwildebeestefontein. On the passage to South Africa he meets Wardlaw, a fellow Scot who is travelling to the same place to take up a position as schoolmaster. The Reverend Laputa is also on board, and is seen in covert conversation with a villainous-looking Portuguese man called Henriques. Suspicious, Crawfurd does not identify himself.

The storekeeper at Blaauwildebeestefontein to whom Crawfurd is to act as assistant, Peter Japp, is a drunkard who is involved in illegal diamond trading. Laputa and Henriques visit the store, and Crawfurd tries to overhear their conversation.

Wardlaw warns Crawfurd of what he believes to be a planned rising of the native tribes of the region, including the Zulu and Swazi peoples, led by Laputa. Captain James Arcoll, intelligence agent and local head of the colonial forces, provides more details. Laputa's skill as a preacher has inspired many tribes across the region and, funded by extensive illegal diamond trading, he has invoked the legend of Prester John to position himself as the man who will lead the forthcoming rising against colonial rule.

Using information from the overheard conversation, Crawfurd infiltrates the cave where the tribal leaders are gathering and witnesses Laputa wearing the 'Great Snake' – the priceless and sacred ruby necklet of Prester John which legitimises his leadership. Laputa makes a powerful speech to launch the uprising. Crawfurd is captured, but escapes during an ambush and seizes the necklet from the hands of Henriques who is trying to steal it for himself. After an all-night chase, Laputa's men eventually recapture Crawfurd, but not before he hides the necklet in a ravine.

Arriving at Laputa's headquarters, Crawfurd appears to be facing imminent death, but saves himself by offering Laputa his knowledge of the necklet's location in exchange for his life. Laputa, who needs the Great Snake in order to convince his followers, goes alone with Crawfurd to search for it. In the ravine, Crawfurd narrowly escapes once more, and steals Laputa's horse to take him to Arcoll's headquarters.

With Laputa now on foot and separated from his people, Arcoll's forces are easily able to quell the leaderless uprising. Meanwhile, Crawfurd returns to the cave and finds the treacherous Henriques dead outside, having been strangled by Laputa. Entering, Crawfurd finds Laputa, who by now knows that all his plans have failed. Laputa destroys a rock bridge that serves as the cave's only entrance, and then commits suicide by jumping into an underground river chasm. Crawfurd makes a daring escape by climbing a dangerous cascade.

Crawfurd rejoins Arcoll, and is instrumental in bringing about the disarmament of the local tribes and the subsequent peace. With Arcoll's help he is rewarded with a large portion of Laputa's treasure that had been hidden in the cave, and he returns to Scotland to resume his studies a rich man.

== Principal characters ==
- David ('Davie') Crawfurd: narrator
- Reverend John Laputa: Minister of the kirk and African tribal leader
- Henriques: Portuguese fortune hunter in league with Laputa
- Peter Japp: South African storekeeper at Blaauwildebeestefontein
- Wardlaw: Scottish schoolmaster at Blaauwildebeestefontein
- Captain James Arcoll: intelligence agent and leader of the colonial forces

== Background ==
Prester John was Buchan's sixth published novel, and the first to reach a wide readership, establishing him as a writer of fast-paced adventures in exotic locales. He drew the background from his two-year stint in South Africa (1901–1903) as political private secretary to Lord Milner, High Commissioner for Southern Africa, in what came to be known as Milner's Young Men or Milner's Kindergarten. It was there that he gained a feeling for the man of action and the sense of adventure, as well as practical, political training.

== Film adaptation ==
A 1920 silent film Prester John, based on the novel, was shot and produced in South Africa by African Film Productions.
