= Fábio Sapateiro =

Portuguese footballer

Personal information
- Full name: Fábio Alexandre Martins Sapateiro
- Date of birth: 18 August 1990 (age 36)
- Place of birth: Arrentela, Portugal
- Height: 1.83 m (6 ft 0 in)
- Position: Goalkeeper

Youth career
- 2000–2001: Quinta do Conde
- 2001–2009: Portimonense

Senior career*
Years	Team	Apps	(Gls)
2009–2011	Portimonense	1	(0)
2010–2011	→ Esperança Lagos (loan)	18	(0)
2011–2015	Esperança Lagos	52	(0)
- * Club domestic league appearances and goals as of 23 April 2017

Fábio Alexandre Martins Sapateiro (born 18 August 1990 in Arrentela, Setúbal District) is a Portuguese footballer who plays as a goalkeeper.
