= Mateus (ambassador) =

Mateus (Portuguese for Matthew), also known as Matthew the Armenian (died May, 1520), was an Ethiopian ambassador sent by regent queen Eleni of Ethiopia to king Manuel I of Portugal and to the Pope in Rome, in search of a coalition to help on the increasing threat that Ethiopia faced from the growing Muslim influence in the region. Mateus arrived at Goa in 1512, and traveled to Portugal in 1514, from where he returned with a Portuguese embassy, along with Francisco Álvares. The Portuguese only understood the nature of his mission after they arrived in Ethiopia in 1520, shortly after Mateus' death, a fact that complicated their mission to the new Ethiopian Emperor.

== Mateus embassy to Portugal ==
Mateus was dispatched by regent queen Eleni of Ethiopia, following the arrival of two Portuguese at Ethiopia in search of Pêro da Covilhã in 1508. Those envoys, including priest João Gomes, João Sanches, and Sid Mohammed were sent by Tristão da Cunha in 1506. Having failed to cross Malindi, they returned to Socotra, from where Afonso de Albuquerque managed to land them in Filuk, arriving in Shewa, Ethiopia. They were killed or disappeared in the returning travel.

Mateus, of Armenian origin, was sent to the Portuguese in India transporting a pious letter from Eleni to king Manuel I of Portugal and a piece of the True Cross. He traveled with his wife, brother-in-law, and servants.

After being robbed in Zaila and detained in Bijapur, Mateus arrived at Dabul, and was received in Goa in December 1512 with great honour by Portuguese governor Afonso de Albuquerque, as a long sought "Prester John" envoy. His arrival was announced by king Manuel I of Portugal to Pope Leo X in 1513. Although Mateus faced the distrust of some of Albuquerque's rivals, who tried to prove he was some impostor or Muslim spy, he was sent by Albuquerque to Cananor, and from there to Portugal. Mateus arrived in Lisbon in February 1514. There, his reports, the letter by queen Eleni and the piece of the cross were much admired by the king and his entourage. While Mateus was in Portugal, Albuquerque advanced in an attempt to take Aden with his expedition into the Red Sea. The desire of turning near-by Massawa into a Portuguese base, may have been influenced by Mateus' reports.

== Return to Ethiopia with Portuguese embassy ==
In 1515 King Manuel answered with an embassy to accompany Mateus to Ethiopia. The mission was headed by old Duarte Galvão and included Father Francisco Álvares, with rich gifts for the king of Ethiopia. They sailed from Lisbon to Goa on 7 April 1515, with the new governor to be, Lopo Soares de Albergaria. From Goa, a fleet departed for the Red Sea trying to land the ambassadors in February 1517, joined by Italian explorer Andrea Corsali. Corsali wrote several letters about the travel, stating that they stopped near Socotra, and proceeded to Aden. Given bad weather and the refusal of Albergaria to go further, getting no closer than the Dahlak Archipelago, they attempted to proceed to Massawa. Mateus had some contacts in Massawa, but after weeks of stalling, old ambassador Duarte Galvão died at Kamaran and the mission was cancelled.

Álvares and Mattheus were forced to wait until the arrival of Soares' replacement, Diogo Lopes de Sequeira, who successfully sent the embassy on, with Dom Rodrigo de Lima replacing Duarte Galvão. The party at last reached Massawa on April 9, 1520, and reached the court of Lebna Dengel. There, Álvares befriended several Europeans who had gained the favor of the Emperor, which included Pêro da Covilhã and Nicolao Branceleon. Álvares' party remained six years in Ethiopia, returning to Lisbon in either 1526 or 1527.
