= Prester John =

Legendary Christian king

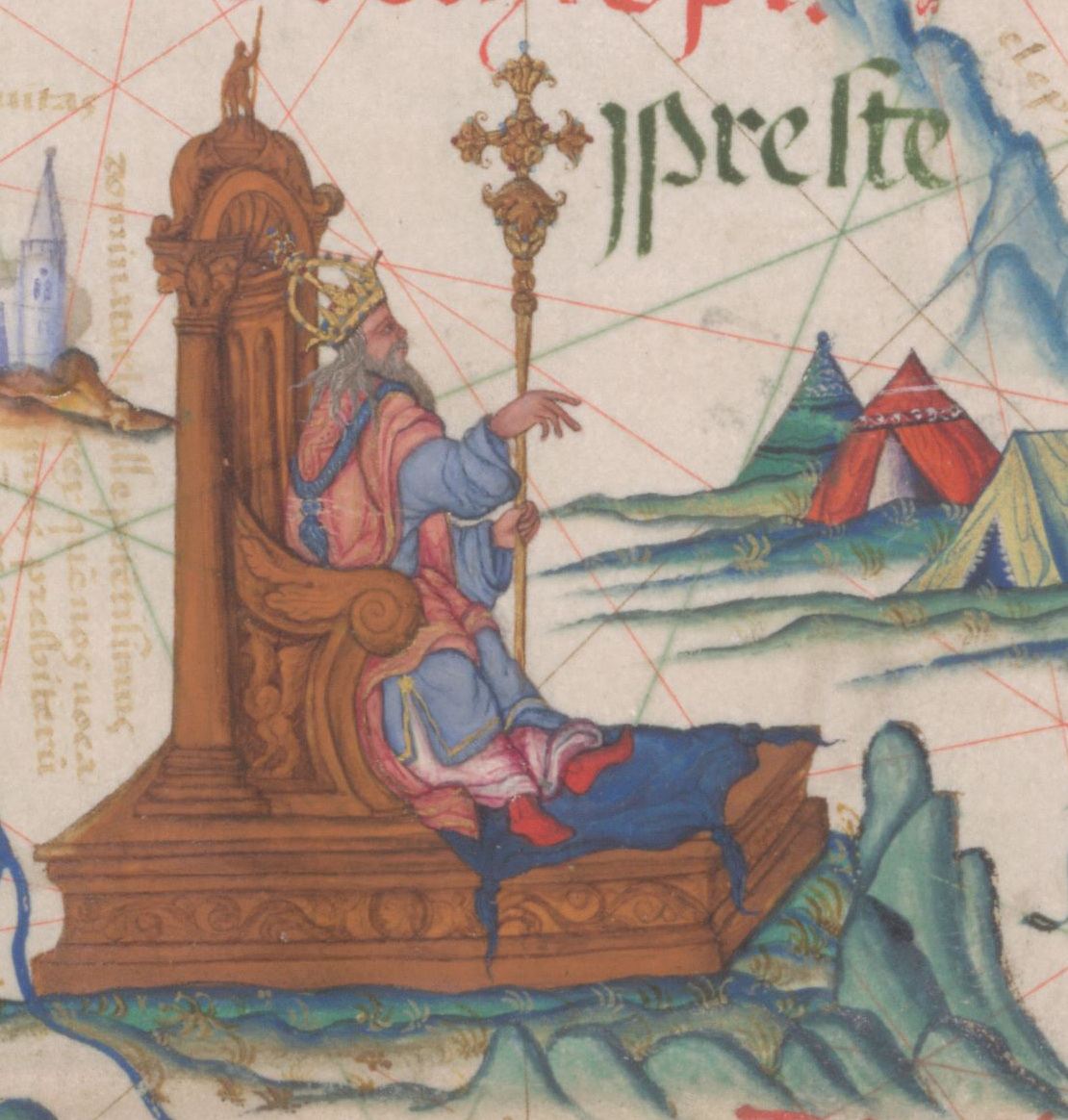
"Preste" as the Emperor of Ethiopia, enthroned on a map of East Africa. From an atlas by the Portuguese cartographer Diogo Homem for Queen Mary, c. 1555–1559. (British Library)

Prester John (Latin: Presbyter Ioannes) was a postulated Christian patriarch, presbyter, and king. Stories popular in Europe in the 12th to the 17th centuries told of a Nestorian patriarch and king who was said to rule over a Christian nation lost amid the pagans and Muslims in the Orient. The accounts were often embellished with various tropes of medieval popular literature, depicting Prester John as a descendant of the Three Magi, ruling a kingdom full of riches, marvels, and strange creatures.

At first, Prester John was thought to reside in India. Reports of the Nestorian Christians' evangelistic success there and of Thomas the Apostle's subcontinental travels as documented in works like the Acts of Thomas probably provided the first seeds of the narrative. As Europeans became aware of the Mongols and their empire, accounts placed the king in Central Asia, and eventually Portuguese explorers came to assume that the term was a reference to Ethiopia, which at that time was an isolated Christian "exclave" distant from any other Christian-ruled territory.

== Origin of the legend ==
Though its immediate genesis is unclear, officially the idea of Prester John originates from a letter that the Byzantine emperor Manuel I Komnenos received in 1165. The sender was: "John, Christian Sovereign and Lord of Lords".

The letter described the very rich lands of this monarch located in central Asia. The king said he lived in an immense palace made of gems and gold and said he governed a huge territory extending from Persia to China. For many years the idea of Prester John was associated with the dream of reaching a sumptuous kingdom, where all material pleasures were fulfilled and people lived in opulence.

The legend of Prester John drew strongly from earlier accounts of the Orient and of Westerners' travels there. Particularly influential were the reports of Saint Thomas the Apostle's proselytizing in India, recorded especially in the third-century work known as the Acts of Thomas. This text inculcated in Westerners an image of India as a place of exotic wonders and offered the earliest description of Saint Thomas establishing a Christian sect there, motifs that loomed large over later accounts of Prester John.

Similarly, embellished reports of movements in Asia of the Church of the East (Nestorianism) informed the narratives as well. This church had gained a wide following in the Eastern nations and engaged the Western imagination as an assemblage both exotic and familiarly Christian. Particularly inspiring were the Church of the East's missionary successes among the Mongols and Turks of Central Asia; French historian René Grousset suggests that the Prester John story may have had its origins in the Kerait clan, which had thousands of its members join the Church of the East shortly after the year 1000. By the 12th century, the Kerait rulers were still following a custom of bearing Christian names, which may have fueled the narrative.

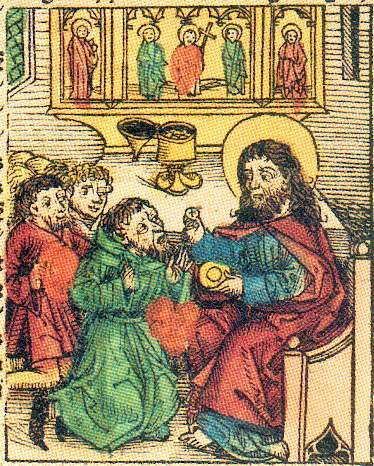
Prester John from Hartmann Schedel's Nuremberg Chronicle, 1493

Additionally, the tradition may have drawn from the shadowy early Christian figure John the Presbyter of Syria, whose existence is first inferred by the ecclesiastical historian and bishop Eusebius of Caesarea based on his reading of earlier church fathers. This man, said in one document to be the author of two of the Epistles of John, was supposed to have been the teacher of the martyr bishop Papias, who had in turn taught Irenaeus. However, little links this figure, supposedly active in the late first century, to the Prester John narrative beyond the name. The title "Prester" is an adaptation of the Greek word "πρεσβύτερος, presbyteros", literally meaning "elder" and used as a title of priests holding a high office (indeed, presbyter is the origin of the English word priest).

Later accounts of Prester John borrowed heavily from literary texts concerning the East, including the great body of ancient and medieval geographical and travel literature. Details were often lifted from literary and pseudohistorical accounts, such as the tale of Sinbad the Sailor. The Alexander Romance, a fabulous account of Alexander the Great's conquests, was especially influential in this regard.

The Prester John narrative as such began in the early 12th century, with reports of visits of an archbishop of India to Constantinople, and of a Patriarch of India to Rome at the time of Pope Callixtus II. These visits, apparently from the Saint Thomas Christians of India, are of dubious veracity, evidence of both being secondhand reports. What is certain is that German chronicler Otto of Freising reported in his Chronicon of 1145 that the previous year he had met Hugh, bishop of Jabala in Syria, at the court of Pope Eugene III in Viterbo.

Hugh was an emissary of Prince Raymond of Antioch, sent to seek Western aid against the Saracens after the Siege of Edessa; his counsel inspired Eugene to call for the Second Crusade. Hugh told Otto, in the presence of the pope, that Prester John, a Nestorian Christian who served in the dual position of priest and king, had regained the city of Ecbatana from the brother monarchs of Media and Persia, the Samiardi, in a great battle "not many years ago". Afterwards Prester John allegedly set out for Jerusalem to rescue the Holy Land, but the swollen waters of the Tigris compelled him to return to his own country. His fabulous wealth was demonstrated by his emerald scepter; his holiness by his descent from the Three Magi.

Robert Silverberg connects this account with historic events of 1141, when the Qara Khitai under Yelü Dashi defeated the Seljuk Turks in the Battle of Qatwan, near Samarkand. The Seljuks ruled over Persia at the time and were the most powerful force in the Muslim world; the defeat at Samarkand weakened them substantially. The Qara Khitai at the time were Buddhists, not Christians, and there is no reason to suppose Yelü Dashi was ever called Prester John. However, several vassals of the Qara Khitai practiced Nestorian Christianity, which may have contributed to the narrative. It is also possible that the Europeans, who were unfamiliar with Buddhism, assumed that if the leader was not Muslim, he must be Christian. The defeat encouraged the Crusaders and inspired a notion of deliverance from the East. It is possible Otto recorded Hugh's confused report to prevent complacency in the Crusade's European backers – according to his account, no help could be expected from a powerful Eastern king.

== Letter of Prester John ==
Prester John sending a letter to the Pope

No more of the narrative is recorded until about 1165, when copies of what was likely a forged Letter of Prester John started spreading throughout Europe. An epistolary wonder epic with parallels suggesting its author knew the Romance of Alexander and the above-mentioned Acts of Thomas, the Letter was supposedly written to the Byzantine emperor Manuel I Comnenus by Prester John, descendant of one of the Three Magi and King of India. The many marvels of richness and magic it contained captured the imagination of Europeans, and it was translated into numerous languages, including Hebrew. It circulated in ever more embellished form for centuries in manuscripts, examples of which still exist. The invention of printing perpetuated the letter's popularity in printed form; it was still current in popular culture during the period of European exploration. Part of the letter's essence was that a lost kingdom of Nestorian Christians still existed in the vastness of Central Asia.

The credence given to the reports was such that Pope Alexander III sent a letter to Prester John via his physician Philip on September 27, 1177. Nothing more is recorded of Philip, but it is most probable that he did not return with word from Prester John. The Letter continued to circulate, accruing more embellishments with each copy. In modern times, textual analysis of the letter's variant Hebrew versions has suggested an origin among the Jews of northern Italy or Languedoc: several Italian words remained in the Hebrew texts. At any rate, the Letter's author was most likely a Westerner.

== Mongol Empire ==
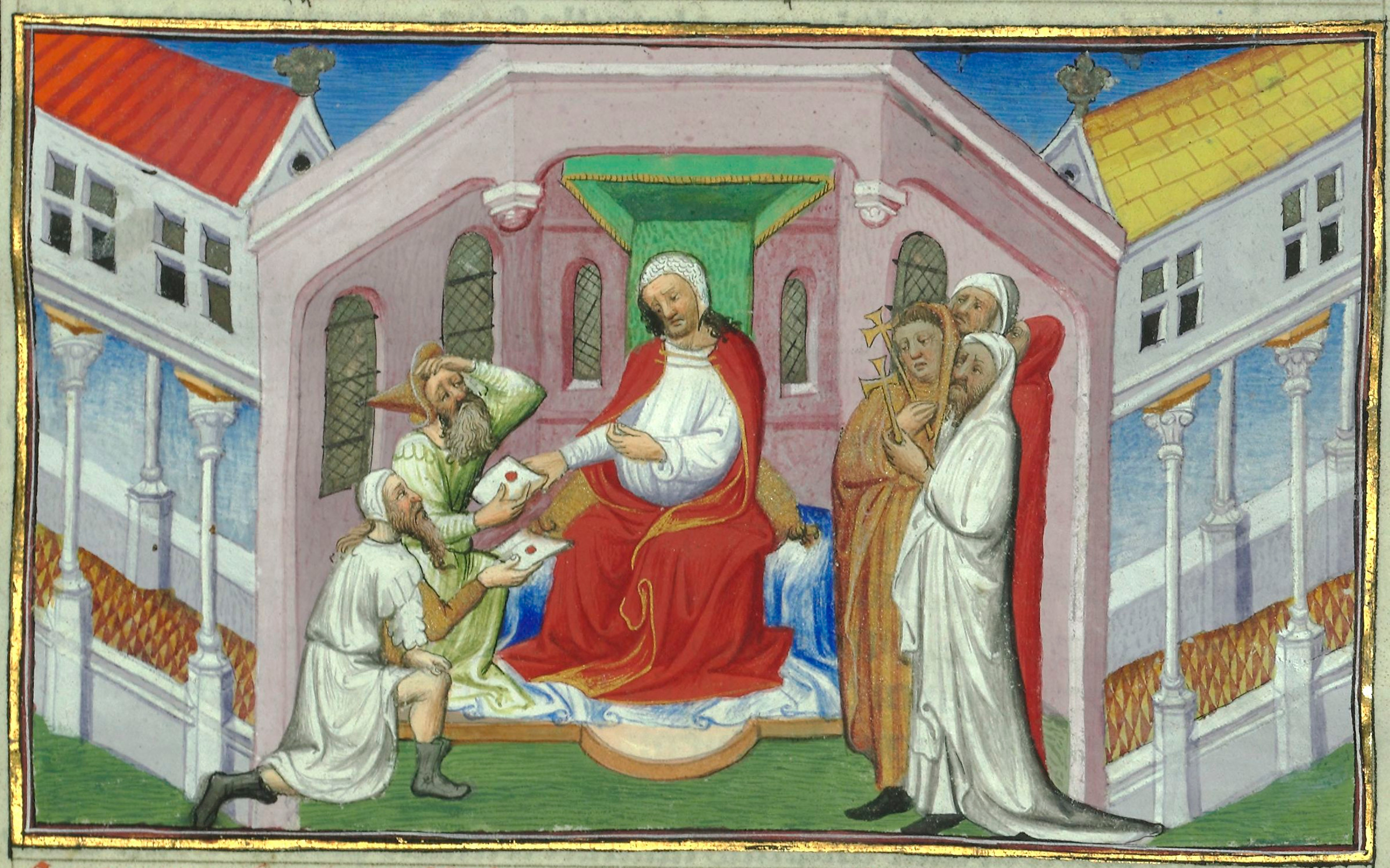
Depiction of the Keraite ruler Toghrul as "Prester John" in "Le Livre des Merveilles", 15th century

In 1221, Jacques de Vitry, Bishop of Acre, returned from the disastrous Fifth Crusade with good news: King David of India, the son or grandson of Prester John, had mobilized his armies against the Saracens. He had already conquered Persia, then under the Khwarazmian Empire's control, and was moving on towards Baghdad as well. This descendant of the great king who had defeated the Seljuks in 1141 planned to reconquer and rebuild Jerusalem.

Controversial Soviet historian and ethnologist Lev Gumilev speculated that the much reduced crusader Kingdom of Jerusalem in the Levant resuscitated this legend in order to raise Christian aspirations and to persuade European monarchs who had lost interest by that time in getting involved in costly crusades, in a distant region that was far removed from their own states and affairs. The bishop of Acre was correct in thinking that a great king had conquered Persia; however "King David", as it turned out, was the Tengrist Mongol ruler, Genghis Khan.

The Mongol Empire's rise gave Western Christians the opportunity to visit lands that they had never seen before, and they set out in large numbers along the empire's secure roads. Presumptions that a lost Nestorian kingdom existed in the east, or that the Crusader states' salvation depended on an alliance with an Eastern monarch, was one reason for the numerous Christian ambassadors and missionaries sent to the Mongols. These include Franciscan explorers Giovanni da Pian del Carpine in 1245 and William of Rubruck in 1253.

The link between Prester John and Genghis Khan was elaborated upon at this time, as the Prester became identified with Genghis' foster father, Toghrul, king of the Keraites, given the Jin title Ong Khan Toghrul. Fairly truthful chroniclers and explorers such as Marco Polo, Crusader-historian Jean de Joinville, and the Franciscan voyager Odoric of Pordenone stripped Prester John of much of his otherworldly veneer, portraying him as a more realistic earthly monarch. Odoric places John's land to the west of Cathay en route to Europe, and identifies its capital as "Cosan", variously interpreted by translators as a number of names and locations. Joinville describes Genghis Khan in his chronicle as a "wise man" who unites all the Tartar tribes and leads them to victory against their strongest enemy, Prester John.

William of Rubruck says a certain "Vut", lord of the Keraites and brother to the Nestorian King John, was defeated by the Mongols under Genghis Khan. Genghis Khan made off with Vut's daughter and married her to his son, and their union produced Möngke, the Khan at the time William wrote. According to Marco Polo's Travels, the war between the Prester and Genghis Khan started when Genghis Khan, new ruler of the rebellious Tartars, asked for the hand of Prester John's daughter in marriage. Angered that his lowly vassal would make such a request, Prester John denied him in no uncertain terms. In the war that followed, Genghis Khan triumphed, and Prester John perished.

The historical figure behind these accounts, Toghrul, was a Nestorian Christian monarch defeated by Genghis Khan. He had fostered the future Khan after the death of his father Yesugei and was one of his early allies, but the two had a falling-out. After Toghrul rejected a proposal to wed his son and daughter to Genghis Khan's children, the rift between them grew, until war broke out in 1203. Genghis Khan captured Sorghaghtani Beki, daughter of Toghrul's brother Jaqa Gambu, and married her to his son Tolui. They had several children, including Möngke, Kublai, Hulagu, and Ariq Böke.

The major characteristic of Prester John literature from this period is the king's portrayal not as an invincible hero, but merely one of many adversaries defeated by the Mongols. As the Mongol Empire collapsed, Europeans began to shift away from the idea that Prester John had ever really been a Central Asian king. At any rate they had little prospects of finding him there, as travel in the region became dangerous without the security the empire had provided. In works such as The Travels of Sir John Mandeville and Historia Trium Regum by John of Hildesheim, Prester John's domain tends to regain its fantastic aspects and finds itself located not on the steppes of Central Asia, but back in India proper, or some other exotic locale. Wolfram von Eschenbach tied the history of Prester John to the Holy Grail legend in his poem Parzival, in which the Prester is the son of the Grail maiden and the Saracen knight Feirefiz.

A theory was put forward by the Russian scholar Ph. Bruun in 1876, who suggested that Prester John might be found among the kings of Georgia, which, at the time of Crusades, experienced military resurgence challenging the Muslim power. However, this theory, though regarded with certain indulgence by Henry Yule and some modern Georgian historians, was summarily dismissed by Friedrich Zarncke. The connection with Georgia is unlikely, considering that country was Orthodox, rather than Nestorian, and due to the fact that it and its predecessor states Colchis/Lazica and Iberia were well known and documented at the time, with Episcopoi of Kartli having regular epistolary conversions with Bishops of Rome.

== Ethiopia ==
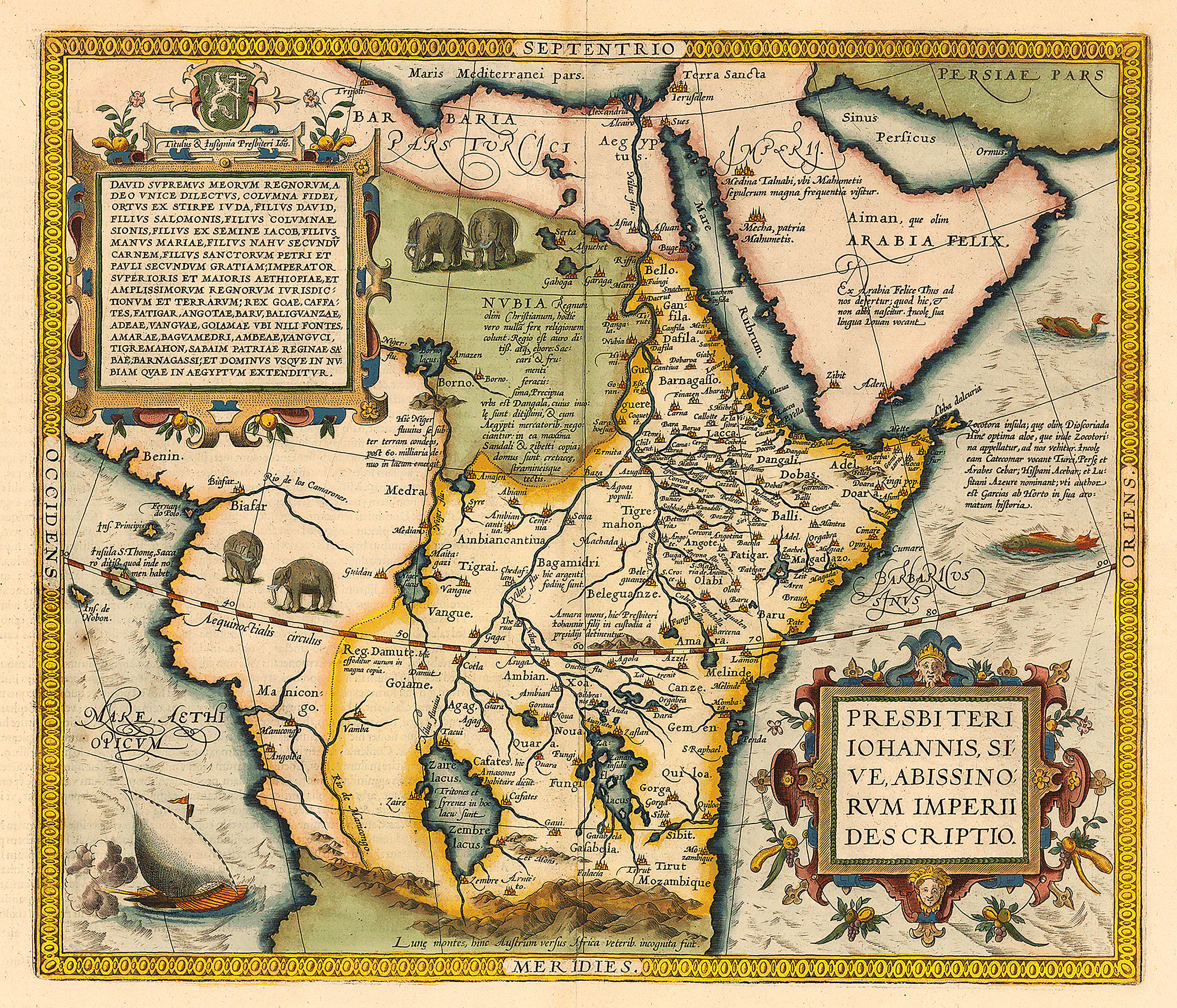
A map of Prester John's kingdom as Ethiopia

Prester John had been considered the ruler of India since the legend's beginnings, but "India" was a vague concept to the medieval Europeans. Writers often spoke of the "Three Indias", and lacking any real knowledge of the Indian Ocean they sometimes considered Ethiopia one of the three. Westerners knew that Ethiopia was a powerful Christian nation, but contact had been sporadic since the rise of Islam. No Prester John was to be found in Asia, so Europeans began to suggest that the narrative was a reference to the Christian kingdom of Ethiopia. Evidence has suggested that locating Prester John's kingdom in Ethiopia entered the collective consciousness around 1250.

Marco Polo had discussed Ethiopia as a magnificent Christian land and Orthodox Christians had a legend that the nation would one day rise up and invade Arabia, but they did not place Prester John there. In 1306, 30 Ethiopian ambassadors from Emperor Wedem Arad came to Europe, and Prester John was mentioned as the patriarch of their church in a record of their visit. Another description of an African Prester John is in the Mirabilia Descripta of Dominican missionary Jordanus, around 1329. In discussing the "Third India", Jordanus records a number of fanciful stories about the land and its king, whom he says Europeans call Prester John.

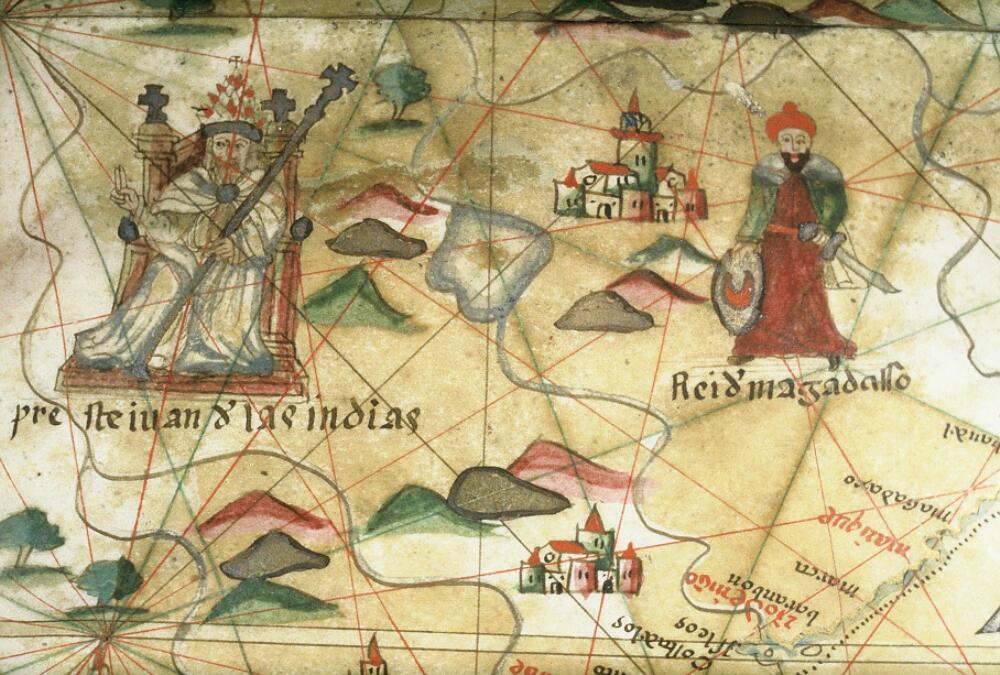
"Preste Iuan de las Indias" (Prester John of the Indies) positioned in East Africa on a 16th-century Spanish Portolan chart

After this point, an African location became increasingly popular. This may have resulted from increasing ties between Europe and Africa as 1428 saw the Kings of Aragon and Ethiopia actively negotiating the possibility of a strategic marriage between the two kingdoms. On 7 May 1487, two Portuguese envoys, Pêro da Covilhã and Afonso de Paiva, were sent traveling secretly overland to gather information on a possible sea route to India, but also to inquire about Prester John. Covilhã managed to reach Ethiopia. Although well received, he was forbidden to depart. Contact for the purpose of finding allies, such as with Prester John increasingly fueled early European exploration and colonialism.

More envoys were sent in 1507, after the island of Socotra was taken by the Portuguese. As a result of this mission, and facing Muslim expansion, regent queen Eleni of Ethiopia sent ambassador Mateus to king Manuel I of Portugal and to the pope, in search of a coalition. Mateus reached Portugal via Goa, having returned with a Portuguese embassy, along with priest Francisco Álvares in 1520. Francisco Álvares's book, which included the testimony of Covilhã, the Verdadeira Informação das Terras do Preste João das Indias ("A True Relation of the Lands of Prester John of the Indies") was the first direct account of Ethiopia, greatly increasing European knowledge at the time, as it was presented to the pope, published and quoted by Giovanni Battista Ramusio.

By the time Emperor Lebna Dengel and the Portuguese had established diplomatic contact with each other in 1520, Prester John was the name by which Europeans knew the Emperor of Ethiopia. The Ethiopians, though, had never called their emperor that. When ambassadors from Emperor Zara Yaqob attended the Council of Florence in 1441, they were confused when Roman Catholic-led council prelates insisted that the Ethiopians should refer to themselves as representatives of their monarch Prester John. They tried to explain that nowhere in Zara Yaqob's list of regnal names did that title occur. However, their admonitions did little to stop Europeans from calling the King of Ethiopia Prester John. Some writers who used the title did understand it was not an indigenous honorific; for instance Jordanus seems to use it simply because his readers would have been familiar with it, not because he thought it authentic.

Ethiopia has been claimed for many years as the origin of the Prester John narrative, but most modern experts assert that the narrative was simply adapted to fit that nation in the same fashion that it had been projected upon Ong Khan and Central Asia during the 13th century. Modern scholars find nothing about Prester John or his country in the early material that would make Ethiopia a more suitable identification than any place else, and furthermore, specialists in Ethiopian history have effectively demonstrated that the story was not widely known there until the Portuguese began to circumnavigate around Africa, which is how they reached Ethiopia, via the Gulf of Aden and the Red Sea. Czech Franciscan Remedius Prutky asked Emperor Iyasu II about this identification in 1751, and Prutky states that the man was "astonished, and told me that the kings of Abyssinia had never been accustomed to call themselves by this name." In a footnote to this passage, Richard Pankhurst states that this is apparently the first recorded statement by an Ethiopian monarch about this tale, and they were likely unaware of the title until Prutky's inquiry.

== Americas ==
The Italian historian Peter Martyr d'Anghiera identified the land of Prester John with Chicora in his Decades of the New World. Francisco de Chicora, a native of what is now South Carolina, who was captured by Spaniards and taken to Spain by Lucas Vázquez de Ayllón, had told Anghiera that his land was ruled by priests.

== End of the narrative and cultural legacy ==
Seventeenth-century academics like German orientalist Hiob Ludolf demonstrated that there was no actual native connection between Prester John and the Ethiopian monarchs, and search for the fabled king gradually ceased. But the narrative had affected several hundred years of European and world history, directly and indirectly, by encouraging Europe's explorers, missionaries, scholars, and treasure hunters.

The prospect of finding Prester John had long since vanished, but the works about him continued to inspire through the 20th century. William Shakespeare's 1600 play Much Ado About Nothing contains an early modern reference to the legendary king, as does Tirso de Molina's El Burlador de Sevilla. In 1878 the Yiddish novelist Mendele Mocher Sforim referenced Prester John alongside numerous other Medieval Abrahamic religious myths such as the Red Jews in his novella The Travels of Benjamin III. In 1910, Scottish novelist and politician John Buchan used the legend in his sixth book, Prester John, to supplement a plot about a Zulu uprising in South Africa. This book is an archetypal example of the early 20th-century adventure novel, and proved very popular in its day.

Throughout the rest of the century, Prester John appeared sporadically in pulp fiction and comics. For example, Marvel Comics has featured "Prester John" in issues of Fantastic Four and Thor. He was a significant supporting character in several issues of the DC Comics fantasy series Arak: Son of Thunder. Charles Williams, a member of the 20th-century literary group the Inklings, made Prester John a messianic protector of the Holy Grail in his 1930 novel War in Heaven. Prester John and his kingdom feature in two works by Umberto Eco. The first is the 2000 novel Baudolino, in which the titular protagonist enlists his friends to write the Letter of Prester John for his adoptive father Frederick Barbarossa, but it is stolen before they can send it out. The second is in Serendipities: Language and Lunacy (1998) on the chapter 'The Force of Falsity' where Eco claims, regardless of scholarly consensus, that the letter from Prester John "... served as an alibi for the expansion of the Christian world..."

In July 1986 issues, Avram Davidson published both a nonfiction essay, "Postscript on Prester John" in Asimov's Science Fiction (part of his "Adventures in Unhistory" series, and later republished in his 1993 book of that title), and a fantasy short story featuring Prester John's realm secretly still ruled by his descendant, "The King Across the Mountains" in Amazing Stories (later republished in The Adventures of Doctor Eszterhazy, 1990).

== Heraldry ==
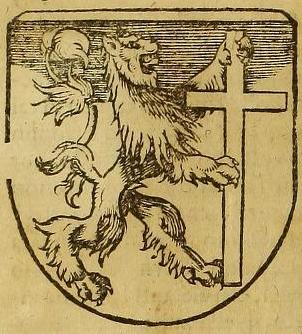
Prester John's coat of arms in an Italian edition of Sebastian Münster's Cosmographia, 1575

Various attributed arms have been given to Prester John. The nave of Canterbury Cathedral, which is adorned with heraldic bosses, represents Prester John with Azure, the Saviour on the Cross or. In the 16th century, cartographer Abraham Ortelius produced a speculative map of John's empire in Africa, featuring A lion rampant facing to the sinister holding in its paws a quasi-Tau cross of full height.

== See also ==
- Eldad ha-Dani
- Wandering Jew
