= Afonso de Paiva =

Portuguese explorer and diplomat

- Born: c. 1443; Castelo Branco, Kingdom of Portugal
- Died: c. 1490; Africa
- Occupations: Explorer, diplomat

Afonso de Paiva (c. 1443 – c. 1490) was a Portuguese diplomat and explorer of Ethiopia and the Barbary Coast together with Pêro da Covilhã. According to James Bruce, Afonso left Pêro da Covilhã at Aden, and proceeded to Suakin where he hoped to join a caravan to his destination. The further details of his life are not recorded. Bruce writes, "only that De Paiva, attempting his journey this way, lost his life, and was never more heard of."
