= 1494 =

1494 in various calendars
- Gregorian calendar: 1494; MCDXCIV
- Ab urbe condita: 2247
- Armenian calendar: 943; ԹՎ ՋԽԳ
- Assyrian calendar: 6244
- Balinese saka calendar: 1415–1416
- Bengali calendar: 900–901
- Berber calendar: 2444
- English Regnal year: 9 Hen. 7 – 10 Hen. 7
- Buddhist calendar: 2038
- Burmese calendar: 856
- Byzantine calendar: 7002–7003
- Chinese calendar: 癸丑年 (Water Ox); 4191 or 3984 — to — 甲寅年 (Wood Tiger); 4192 or 3985
- Coptic calendar: 1210–1211
- Discordian calendar: 2660
- Ethiopian calendar: 1486–1487
- Hebrew calendar: 5254–5255
- Hindu calendars
- Vikram Samvat: 1550–1551
- Shaka Samvat: 1415–1416
- Kali Yuga: 4594–4595
- Holocene calendar: 11494
- Igbo calendar: 494–495
- Iranian calendar: 872–873
- Islamic calendar: 899–900
- Japanese calendar: Meiō 3 (明応３年)
- Javanese calendar: 1411–1412
- Julian calendar: 1494; MCDXCIV
- Korean calendar: 3827
- Minguo calendar: 418 before ROC 民前418年
- Nanakshahi calendar: 26
- Thai solar calendar: 2036–2037
- Tibetan calendar: ཆུ་མོ་གླང་ལོ་ (female Water-Ox); 1620 or 1239 or 467 — to — ཤིང་ཕོ་སྟག་ལོ་ (male Wood-Tiger); 1621 or 1240 or 468

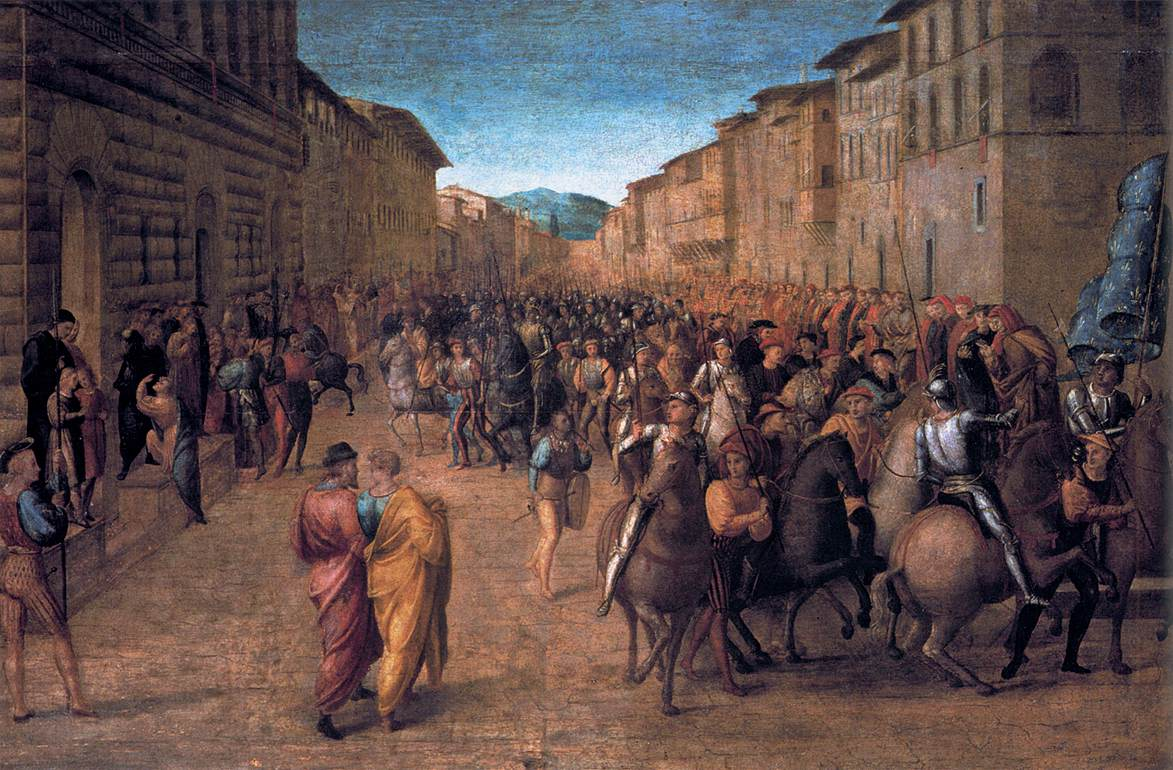
November 17: After invading the Italian Peninsula, King Charles VIII of France and his armies capture the city of Florence, and threaten to destroy it. (1517 painting by Francesco Granacci)

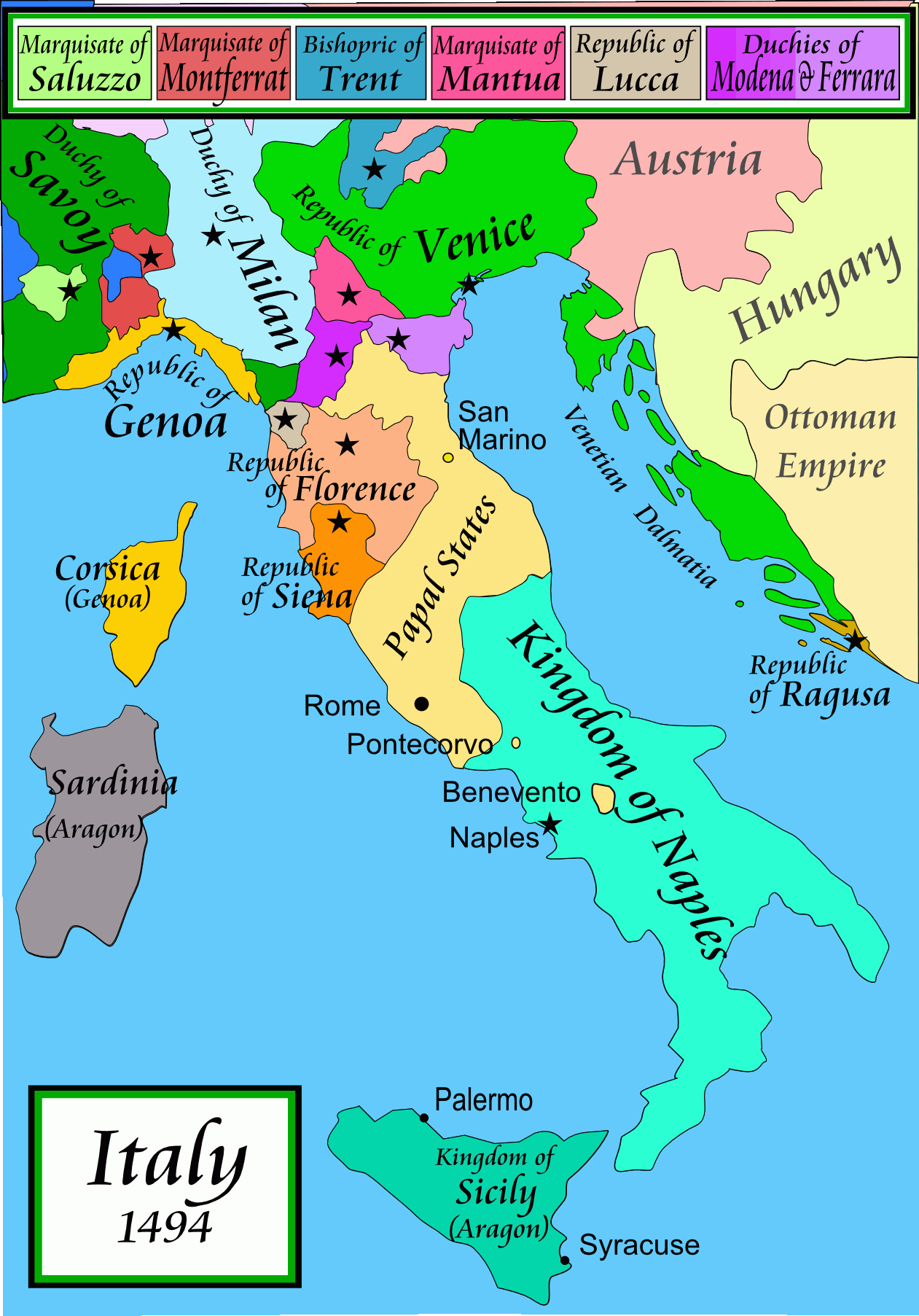
A rough map of the 11 rival Italian nations in 1494

Year 1494 (MCDXCIV) was a common year starting on Wednesday of the Julian calendar.

== Events ==
=== January–March ===
- January 4 – The Cetinje Octoechos (Цетињски октоих, an Eastern Orthodox octoechos (liturgy), first tone), the first incunabulum written in the Serbian recension of Church Slavonic, and the first book printed in Cyrillic in Southeast Europe, is completed in Cetinje.
- January 25 – Alfonso II becomes King of Naples.
- February 5 – The war between the Grand Duchy of Moscow and the Grand Duchy of Lithuania ends after almost seven years, with the Tsar Ivan III signing a "treaty of Eternal Peace" with Lithuania's Grand Duke Alexander Jagiellon. Lithuania is guaranteed its independence in return for ceding its territories captured by Moscow.
- March 16 – Maximilian, King of the Romans, marries Bianca Maria Sforza, sister of the Duke of Milan after the annulment of his marriage to Anne, Duchess of Brittany.
- March 24 – An earthquake estimated centuries later at 5.5 magnitude, strikes the Chinese city of Qujing, destroying 200 homes.

=== April–June ===
- April 30 – On his second voyage to the New World, Columbus and his crew become the first Europeans to sail into what is now Guantanamo Bay in Cuba.
- May 5 – Christopher Columbus first sights Jamaica.
- May 7 – The infant Amda Seyon II succeeds his father Eskender as Emperor of Ethiopia.
- May 31 – First Battle of Acentejo: Natives of the island of Tenerife, known as Guanches, defeat the invading Spanish forces.
- May – Maximilian I, Holy Roman Emperor, recognises the pretender Perkin Warbeck as rightful King of England.
- June 7 – Treaty of Tordesillas: Spain and Portugal divide the New World between themselves.

=== July–September ===
- July 2 –
  - In a battle fought at the village of Igris (now part of western Romania) in territory claimed by Hungary and the Ottoman state of Wallachia, the Hungarian General Pál Kinizsi defeats Turkish armies led by the Ottoman governor Basarab II of Wallachia."Istorie". Primăria comunei Sânpetru Mare.
  - Spain ratifies the Treaty of Tordesillas to divide the lands discovered outside of Europe between Spain (the Kingdoms of Castile and Aragon) and Portugal, essentially granting Spain almost all of the lands in the Americas and Portugal all of the lands in Africa.
- July 29 – Jan V Zatorski, ruler of the Duchy of Zator, sells the Duchy to King Jan I Olbracht of Poland for 80,000 florins, on condition that he retains his title and the right to continue to live in his castle for the rest of his life.
- August 29 – King Charles VIII of France departs from Grenoble with 30,000 troops and 10,000 naval crew on his way toward Italy, in order to assert his claim to become King of Naples (a post occupied by King Alfonso II and to go to war.
- September 5 – The Kingdom of Portugal ratifies its agreement with Spain, the Treaty of Tordesillas, conceding that Spain has jurisdiction of most of the New World, with the exception of what will eventually become the Portuguese colony of Brazil, initially a longitude of 42°30' W.
- September 8 – The three day Battle of Rapallo, fought as part of the Italian War of 1494–1495 between the Kingdom of France and the Kingdom of Naples, is won by the French naval fleet, which then captures and loots Rapallo, near Genoa, after the Neapolitans flee.
- September 11 – King Charles VIII of France and Ludovico Sforza, regent for the Duke of Milan, meet in Asti and conclude an alliance against King Alfonso II of Naples.
- September 24 – The earliest hurricane to be specifically recorded by historians, strikes the island of Hispaniola near the Spanish colonial capital, La Isabela, the day after Christopher Columbus arrives at Saona, following five months of explorations.

=== October–December ===
- October 13 – The British administrator assigned to Ireland, Sir Edward Poynings, arrives at Ireland with about 1,000 men and lands at Howth.
- October 21 – France and Milan, with at least 14,000 troops, capture the town of Mordano, part of the Lordship of Imola, an ally of Naples. The French then begin killing at least 300 of the Mordano defenders and pillaging the town, while the Kingdom of Naples refuses to come to Mordano's defense.
- October 22 – Ludovico Sforza becomes Duke of Milan upon the death of his nephew, the Duke Gian Galeazzo Sforza, and invites Charles VIII of France to invade Italy in support of his claim, beginning the First Italian War in the Italian Wars.
- October 26 – Amda Seyon II is deposed and killed, and his uncle Na'od succeeds him as Emperor of Ethiopia.
- November 8 – Facing little opposition in his march across Italy, King Charles VIII of France captures Pisa.
- November 9 – The Medici Bank becomes insolvent and the House of Medici is expelled from Florence.
- November 10 – Fra Luca Pacioli's Summa de arithmetica, geometria, proportioni et proportionalità is published in Venice, containing the first printed account of algebra in the vernacular, and the first published description of the double-entry accounting system.
- November 17 – Italian War of 1494–98: The armies of King Charles VIII of France enter Florence. Charles is dissuaded from destroying the city by the Florentine leader, Girolamo Savonarola, who had recently taken control from the Medici family. After being persuaded that he has a divine role of reformation of the Roman Catholic Church, King Charles spares Florence from destruction and leaves the city on November 28, guiding his troops onward toward Rome.
- December 1 – The Irish Parliament opens at Drogheda on the first Monday after Saint Andrew's Day as summoned by Sir Edward Poynings, to pass the two "Poynings' Laws" restricting Irish self-government. The more drastic of the two laws provides that laws already enacted in England apply to Ireland as well, while the other law directs that the Irish Parliament cannot be summoned without prior approval by the King of England.
- December 25 – Second Battle of Acentejo: The Spanish crush the native forces of the island of Tenerife, leading to the subjugation of this last bastion of resistance in the Canary Islands.
- December 31 – King Charles VIII of France and the French Army peacefully march into Rome after being granted free passage by Pope Alexander VI.

=== Date unknown ===
- Aztec forces conquer and sack Mitla.
- Johann Reuchlin publishes De verbo mirifico.
- Charles VIII of France purchases the right to the Byzantine Empire from exiled pretender, Andreas Palaiologos.

== Births ==
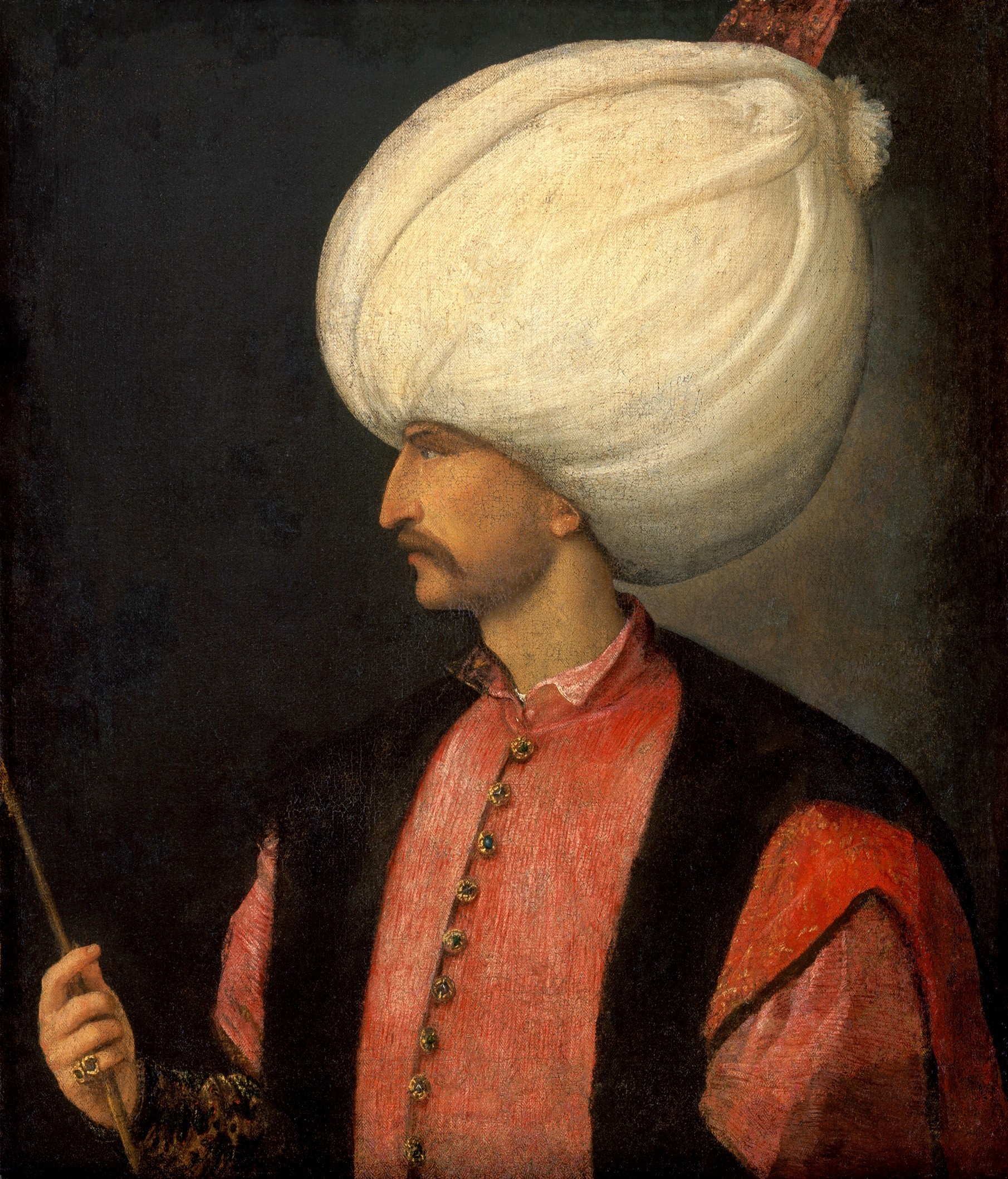
Suleiman the Magnificent

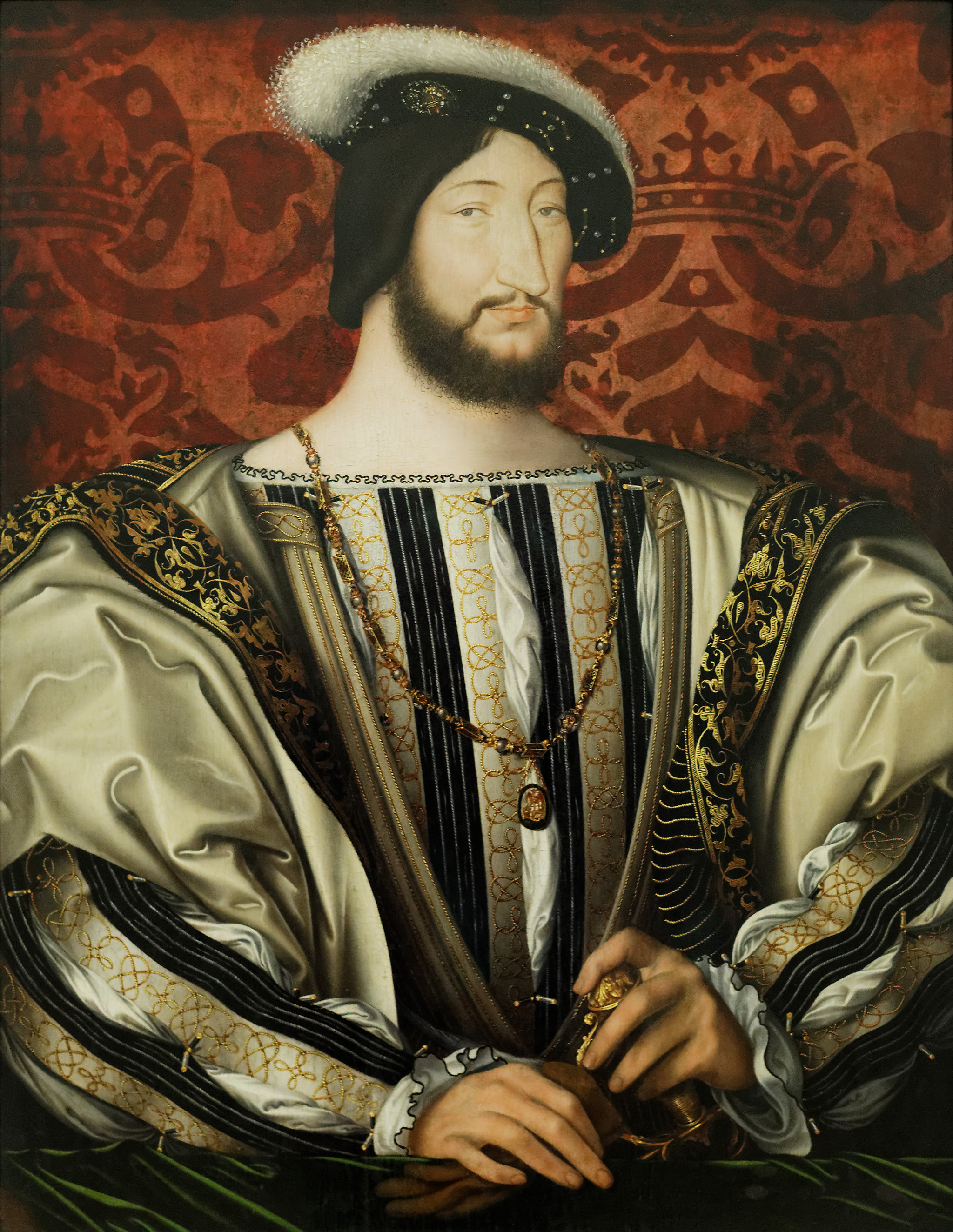
Francis I of France

- February 2 – Bona Sforza, queen of Sigismund I of Poland (d. 1557)
- February 11 – Takeda Nobutora, Japanese warlord (d. 1574)
- February 20 – Johan Friis, Danish statesman (d. 1570)
- March 24 – Georgius Agricola, German mineralogist and scholar (d. 1555)
- March 25 – Elisabeth of Brandenburg-Ansbach-Kulmbach, Margravine (d. 1518)
- April 4 – Ambrosius Moibanus, German theologian (d. 1554)
- April 20 – Johannes Agricola, German Protestant reformer (d. 1566)
- April 25 – Juan Téllez-Girón, 4th Count of Ureña, Spanish count (d. 1558)
- May 24 – Pontormo, Italian painter (d. 1557)
- August 18 – Johannes Scheubel, German mathematician (d. 1570)
- September 8 – Sri Chand, Indian founder of the ascetic sect of Udasi (d. 1629)
- September 11 – Elisabeth of Brunswick-Lüneburg, Duchess of Guelders (1518–1538) (d. 1572)
- September 12 – King Francis I of France (d. 1547)
- October 31 – Wolfgang of the Palatinate, Count Palatine of Neumarkt (1524–1558), governor of the Upper Palatinate (d. 1558)
- November 5 – Hans Sachs, German meistersinger ("mastersinger") (d. 1576)
- November 6 – Suleiman the Magnificent, Ottoman Sultan (d. 1566)
- November 12 – Margaret of Anhalt-Köthen, Princess of Anhalt by birth, Duchess consort of Saxony (d. 1521)
- November (probable) – François Rabelais, French Renaissance writer (d. 1553)
- date unknown
  - Alonso Álvarez de Pineda, Spanish explorer and cartographer (d. 1519)
  - Christina Gyllenstierna, Swedish national heroine (d. 1559)
  - Ambrosius Holbein, German painter (d. 1519)
  - Qiu Ying, Chinese painter (d. 1552)
  - Saitō Dōsan, Japanese warlord (d. 1556)
  - John Sutton, 3rd Baron Dudley, English soldier (d. 1554)
  - Hans Tausen, Danish religious reformer (d. 1561)
  - William Tyndale, English-born religious reformer and Bible translator (executed 1536)

== Deaths ==
- January 11 – Domenico Ghirlandaio, Italian artist (b. 1449)
- January 20 – Seongjong of Joseon, King of Joseon (b. 1457)
- January 25 – King Ferdinand I of Naples (b. 1423)
- May 7 – Eskender, Emperor of Ethiopia (b. 1471)
- August 1 – Giovanni Santi, Italian artist and father of Raphael (b. c. 1435)
- August 11 – Hans Memling, Flemish painter (b. c. 1430)
- September 24 – Poliziano, Italian humanist (b. 1454)
- October 21 – Gian Galeazzo Sforza, Duke of Milan (b. 1469)
- October 26 – Amda Seyon II, Emperor of Ethiopia (b. c. 1487)
- November 8 – Melozzo da Forlì, Italian painter (b. c. 1438)
- November 15 – William Calthorpe, English knight (b. 1410)
- November 16 – Theda Ukena, countess regent of East Frisia (b. 1432)
- November 17 – Giovanni Pico della Mirandola, Italian humanist (b. 1463)
- December 19 or December 20 – Matteo Maria Boiardo, Italian poet (b. c. 1434-1441)
