= Romna Wark =

Empress-consort of Ethiopia

Empress of Ethiopia
- Reign: ?–1478

Queen Mother
- Reign: 1478–?
- Predecessor: Eleni of Ethiopia
- Successor: Unknown

Regent
- Reign: 1478–?
- Died: after 1492
- Spouse: Baeda Maryam I
- Issue: Eskender 'Enkua 'Esra'el
- Dynasty: House of Solomon _{(by marriage)}

Romna Wark (Amharic: ሮምና ዋርክ, sometimes called Eleni,; fl. 1478), was an Empress consort of Ethiopia, married to emperor Baeda Maryam I. She was the mother of emperor Eskender (r. 1478–1494), and regent of Ethiopia during the minority of her son.

She was the first of three women to rule as regent of the Ethiopian Empire (1270–1974), the others being Eleni and Mentewab.

== Life ==
Her name means "the pomegranate of gold".

Romna Wark married Baeda Maryam I. She became the mother of the future emperor Eskender and 'Enkua 'Esra'el.

When her spouse died in 1478, her son Eskender succeeded him on the throne. In accordance with the will of the late emperor, Romna Wark gave the order that he should be brought from Mount Geshena, where was residing at the time, and had him crowned in the presence of the royal chaplain Tasfa Giyorgis. Since her son was seven years old and a minor at the time of his accession to the throne, she was made his regent during his minority.

=== Regent ===
Romna Wark was described as good, virtuous and loveable. She performed her duties as regent in collaboration with a council composed of the highest functionaries. The influential position of Tasfa Giyorgis during her regency resulted in protests from the opposition under the leadership of the priests Abba Hasabo, Abba Amdu and Meeman, against his autocratic behaviour, and she punished and banished many of the members of opposition.

Some sources claim that Eskender was murdered in 1492 but his death was hidden by Romna Wark and her advisors for three years out of fear the governor of Amhara, Za Selase (Zasillus), would place an usurper on the throne due to the young age of Eskender's son Amda Seyon II. Za Selase eventually found out about this and led an uprising but this failed and had his eyes gouged out and was put to death.

== See also ==
- List of royal consorts of Ethiopia
- Eleni of Ethiopia
- Mentewab

== Bibliography ==
- Budge, E. A. (1928). A History of Ethiopia: Nubia and Abyssinia (Volume I). London: Methuen & Co.
- Morié, Louis J. (1904). Histoire de L'Éthiopie (Nubie et Abyssinie): Histoire de L'Abyssinie (in French). Paris.
