= Giovan Battista Volpini =

Italian general during World War II

- Born: 24 August 1883; Verona, Kingdom of Italy
- Died: 16 May 1941 (aged 57); Amba Alagi, Ethiopia
- Military career
- Allegiance: Kingdom of Italy
- Branch: Royal Italian Army
- Rank: Major General
- Conflicts: Italo-Turkish War; World War I; Battles of the Isonzo; Pacification of Libya; World War II; East African Campaign; Battle of Amba Alagi
- Awards: Silver Medal of Military Valour (twice); Bronze Medal of Military Valour; War Cross for Military Valor; Military Order of Savoy

Giovan Battista Volpini (24 August 1883 – 16 May 1941) was an Italian general during World War II.

== Biography ==
Volpini was born in 1883 in Verona from Piedmontese parents; his father, Carlo Volpini, was a General in the Royal Italian Army, and he followed his path by enlisting in the Army as a cavalry officer. Most of Volpini's career took place in Italy's African colonies. In 1912 he fought in Libya during the Italo-Turkish War, after the end of which he remained in Libya, fighting the local guerrilla movement until he was wounded in action in 1915 and repatriated. After recovering and fighting on the Italian Front during World War I, where he earned a Silver Medal of Military Valour, during the 1920s he participated in the Pacification of Libya commanding for ten years, with the rank of major, a Meharist squad called "Volpini column", and initially composed of 500 riflemen and 50 horsemen. In 1923 this column, as part of the forces led by General Rodolfo Graziani, participated in the "pacification" of the Orfella region of Tripolitania. On February 4, 1924, Major Volpini, in command of 1,000 riflemen, 240 Meharists and 70 horsemen, left Nalut on the orders of the Governor Giuseppe Volpi to establish control over the region of Ghadames. On the 7th of the same month he captured Sinauen, the only oasis with water between Nalut and Ghadames. After a brief battle in Bir el Uotia, on February 15 Vopini captured Ghadames.

In Tripolitania Volpini met the Amedeo of Savoy, Duke of Aosta, with whom he established a sincere and deep friendship. When the Duke of Aosta was appointed Viceroy of Ethiopia in 1937, the then Brigadier General Volpini followed him to Italian East Africa and became, in the same year, the Duke's first aide-de-camp, Chief of Staff of the Viceregal Government in Italian East Africa and Head of the Viceregal House. Together with the Duke, he contributed to the pacification of the new colony by seeking the collaboration of the local population.

Volpini was still serving in this capacity when World War II broke out. After the fall of Addis Ababa to the British in April 1941, Volpini followed the Duke in his retreat to the mountain fortress of Amba Alagi, where Aosta and his force of 7,000 men were surrounded and besieged by some 40,000 British troops and Ethiopian irregulars. On May 16, 1941, General Volpini was tasked by the Duke with meeting the British commanders to negotiate. On his way to the British command, however, Volpini and his Carabinieri escort, one Major and two soldiers, were stopped by Ethiopian irregulars. After a brief but excited discussion, the Ethiopians appeared to allow the Italian delegation to continue their journey, but then opened fire on them, killing all four. In his diary, the Duke of Aosta lamented the death of Volpini, who had been at his side for sixteen years. Volpini's body was recovered by the British and buried on May 19 near Fort Toselli, at the top of Amba Alagi.
