= Lithuanian–Muscovite War (1487–1494) =

War between Muscovy and Lithuania

Lithuanian-Muscovite War (1487–1494)
- Part of Muscovite–Lithuanian Wars
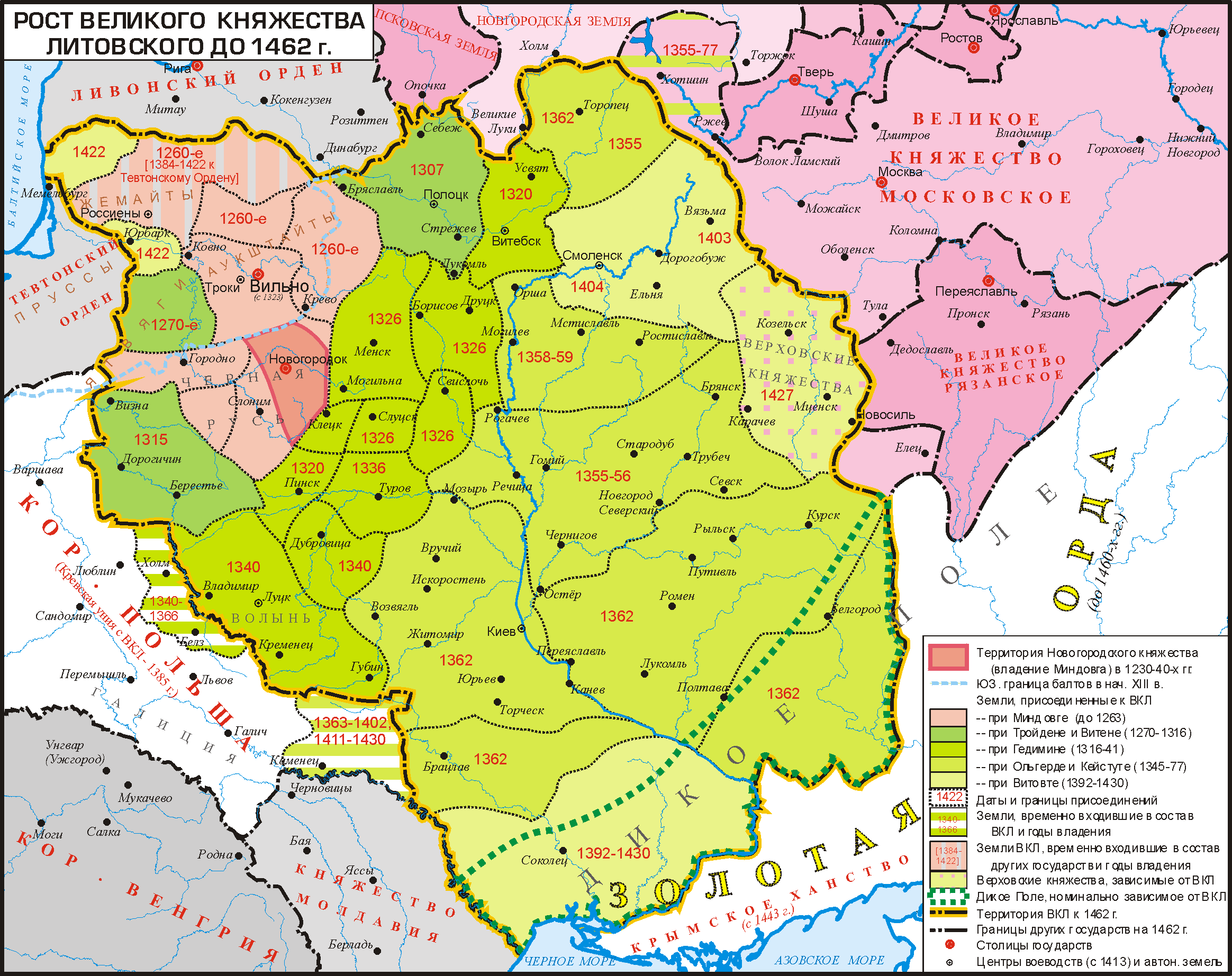
Date	1487–1494
Location	Lithuania, Ukraine, Belarus, Russia
Result	Muscovite victory (see § Aftermath)
Territorial changes	Lithuania cedes Veliky Novgorod, Pskov, Tver, and Ryazan to Muscovy; Muscovy renounces its claims on Smolensk and Bryansk

Belligerents
Grand Duchy of Lithuania and Ruthenia Great Horde	Principality of Moscow; Crimean Khanate

Commanders and leaders
Casimir IV Jagiellon; Alexander Jagiellon	Ivan III of Russia; Meñli I Giray

The Lithuanian-Muscovite War of 1487–1494 (First border war) was the war of the Principality of Moscow, in alliance with the Crimean Khanate, against the Grand Duchy of Lithuania in alliance with the Golden Horde Khan Akhmat, and united by personal union (Union of Krewo) with the Kingdom of Poland under the leadership of Grand Duke Casimir IV Jagiellon.

The Grand Duchy of Lithuania was home to Ruthenians (ancestors of the modern Ukrainians, Belarusians and Rusyns) and the war was fought over the Ruthenian lands (Kyivan inheritance).

== History ==
By the 1480s, the Principality of Moscow had conquered the Novgorod Republic, the Principality of Tver, and in 1487, Moscow's troops took Kazan and made the Khanate of Kazan its vassal. At the same time, the doctrine of the "Third Rome" was formed in Moscow, and the Muscovite princes began to actively "gather the Russian lands" that had previously been part of Kievan Rus'.

In the second half of the 15th century, Moscow launched an offensive on the Ruthenian lands under Lithuania. At the same time, after a civil war in the Grand Duchy of Lithuania (1432–1438) and the unsuccessful attempt to create the Grand Duchy of Rus, some of the Ruthenian magnates and princes decided to turn to Moscow for help. Disagreeing with the union of the Lithuanian-Rus state with Poland, they negotiated with the Moscow prince and even began to move to the Moscow state.

In the summer of 1482, Prince Ivan III of Russia sent an embassy, valuable gifts, and a considerable sum of money to the Crimean Khan Meñli I Giray in an attempt to make him attack the Lithuanian Rus' lands. Mengli Geray, at the urging of the Prince of Moscow, went on a campaign to Kiev. On September 1, he captured the city, burned cathedrals and churches, and captured many people. As a gift to Prince Ivan of Moscow, the khan sent a cart with looted goods from Kiev's cathedrals and churches, including an iconostasis, a golden bowl and a discus from St. Sophia Cathedral.

At the same time, in the 1480s, a number of raids by Moscow detachments took place on the border territories of the Grand Duchy of Lithuania, Russia and Samogitia. Thus, in 1487, Prince Ivan Vorotynsky attacked Mezetsk and plundered it. This was the reason for the official start of the war.

The Moscow-Lithuanian war is divided into two stages:

- 1st stage 1487–1492;
- 2nd stage 1492–1494

The first stage took place, mostly in border skirmishes in the north-eastern principalities of the Grand Duchy of Lithuania.

In 1492–1494, concluding a new alliance with the Crimean Khan, Moscow made a number of joint campaigns in the Kiev, Podillya, Volyn, and Chernihiv regions. Thus, in 1493 Mengli-Girey together with the Grand Duke of Moscow Ivan III conducted a joint campaign in Kiev and the Kiev region.

== Aftermath ==
In February 1494, the Eternal Peace was concluded, according to which most of the so-called "Upper Oka Principalities" went to Moscow, and Lithuania agreed to give Veliky Novgorod, Pskov, Tver and Ryazan to Moscow. Moscow renounced its claims to Smolensk and Bryansk, which remained part of the Grand Duchy of Lithuania. In addition, the Grand Duke of Lithuania (since 1492) Alexander Jagiellon married Ivan III's daughter Elena. Moscow formally conquered the Pskov Republic in 1510, and later the Principality of Ryazan in 1521.
