= Dankali Sultanate =

Medieval Muslim kingdom

Kingdom of Dankali
- 13th century–18th century
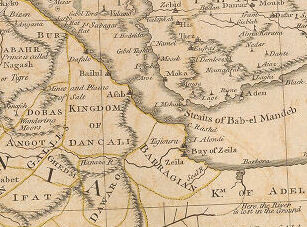
- Capital: Dankali
- Common languages: Afar; Arabic
- Ethnic groups: Afars
- Religion: Islam
- Demonym: Danakil
- History
  - Established: 13th century
  - Disestablished: 18th century
- Currency: Amolé
Preceded by	Succeeded by
Kingdom of Aksum	Sultanate of Aussa
- Today part of: Eritrea; Ethiopia; Djibouti

Dankali, also known as Dancaly, Dancale, Dandali and Dangalli was a medieval Muslim kingdom ruled by the Afar people located in the Horn of Africa.

== Etymology ==
The people to the north, living along the coast, came to be known as the Ankala. Some scholars have suggested that the name Dankali—Danakil in its plural form, may be an Arabized version of Ankala. According to the Anthropological Society of Paris, the word Dankali may have been derived Arab word "Djangali" meaning stupid or the Amharic word "Donkoro" meaning weak. The term “Dankali” could also be traced back to the Afar language and is derived from the words “dan” (meaning “people” or “nation”) and “kali” (referring to the Afar Region).

== History ==
=== Early history ===
The earliest surviving written mention of the Dankali is from the 13th-century Andalusian writer Ibn Sa'id, who reported that the domain of the Danakil inhabited the area around the port of Suakin, as far south as Bab-el-Mandeb.

=== War against Dobe'a ===
According to an Ethiopian royal chronicle, the ruler of Dankali on the occasion of Baede Maryam's conquest against the Dobe'a offered him military support. In his pledge to help combat the Dobe'a. James Bruce stated that he had gifted the Emperor a horse and a mule laden with dates, together with a shield made of elephant hide and two spears. With a message attached stating:

"I have set up my camp, Oh my master, with the intention of stopping these people. If they are your enemies, I will not let them pass, and will seize them".

Baede Maryam replied with warm appreciation, saying "You have done well; do not let them enter your territory".

=== Coup by King Sahim ===
In Suseynos' chronicle, it reports that the Dankali king Kamil had recently overthrown his brother Sahim, had travelled up to the Emperor's camp at Dehana in 1620. He prostrated himself in front of Emperor Suseynos and appealed for his protection. The monarch therefore crowned him, made celebration for him, confirmed his royalty and established a tribute that half of his taxes collected in his country. Several members of Kamil's family were later brought up in the Emperor's court.

According to Pedro Paez however, it was the son of Sahim who had overthrown Kamil:

"Then came {And the king of Dancalî, who is called Camêl, when he was} «because he was» {defeated by the son of his brother Sehim «and had nobody else in whose shadow he could shelter» {came to the emperor and worshipped} and asked him to help him. And he gave him valuable robes and men, with whom he regained his kingdom, and he granted that he should pay only half of the tribute that he paid every year"

=== Portuguese description of the Dankali Kingdom ===
In 1625, Jeronimo Lobo and his Portuguese companions had arrived at Baylul to travel to Emperor Suseynos' court. Lobo then described Baylul as the following:

"It is the port of a small, barren, poorly populated kingdom called Dancali. It is ruled by a Muslim, the entire population being of the same faith. This ruler recognizes a certain vassalage to the Emperor of Ethiopia, either for reasons of self-preservation or because of a historic feudal relationship. He was always loyal and obedient to what the Emperor ordered him to do. "It was a small town of no more than fifty inhabitants, straw houses, not much in the way of provisions beyond a few goats and kids which the Muslims sold them since all the people in that kingdom are poor, rough and usually very wretched. Their shelter was under a shed open on all sides. Their beds were the ground or mats, and at most their bales — a practice which they continued for their entire journey so that they soon became used to it, and it stood them in good stead for later experiences. Even there, they had some delicacies to eat because they had some things from the ship's provisions: rice, dates, and biscuit."

The Portuguese had given elaborate gifts to the Arabian merchants and also gave some to other less important people; for many gathered round to watch the distribution. All this was necessary for newcomers who wanted to have friends in a land which produced so few friendly people. They withdrew to the town, where they stayed for thirteen days, which should have been a shorter time since there was nothing for them to do there.

On land, the Portuguese found some flour, a few goats and kids which did not cost them much and whose only drawback was that there were too few of them. Since they did not know how much trust they could place in the friendliness of their hosts, they stood watch by turns all through the night, not because they would be able to defend themselves against them if they intended to harm them, since they did not know their way by land, the land being so strange to them, and there was no recourse by sea, but rather so that they would not be taken by surprise which they considered an advantage well worth the effort for the whole journey, during which they kept up this practice of standing watch.

During the thirteen days they stayed there, with nothing remarkable happening to them, they hired camels for their belongings and bought a few donkeys of which they could avail themselves when greatly fatigued and which would, in the meantime, carry the bags containing the breviaries and each one's little books. And because they did not find enough donkeys for each of them to have one, they bought one for every two Fathers. The owners loaded and unloaded them, took them to pasture and brought them back, since each of them had no better or worse servants than themselves.

The Portuguese then set out to continue their expedition on Ascension Day, The first malicious thing perpetrated on the Portuguese by the inhabitants and there were many such things, as one might expect from camel drivers was that, although the king of Dancali was very close to where the Portuguese were and they could have reached his court in two or three days by traveling inland on a good pleasant road with water and food available, they purposely led the Portuguese on a detour always at the edge of the sea, lacking water, through sandy places and untrodden, unpleasant deserts for the purpose of keeping the Portuguese from seeing their more desirable lands which they feared the Portuguese might come to conquer; for they were certainly not without fears in this respect where there was so little reason for them to have them.

The Muslim inhabitants were also motivated by something else in taking us on this detour, and this was that they had received payment for the hiring of the camels much larger than what was normally paid in that land, although we considered it cheap, and gave Lobo and his men so much work in order to deserve the pay. Needless to say, if they had known this, they would not only have excused them but would have paid them even more. We travelled on foot behind and at the pace of the camels, with our walking sticks in our hands, dressed now in their Jesuit garb. The Dankali did not show any surprise at the difference between the present garb and that in which they first saw me. They believed that both belonged to us and were appropriate to their functions. The day's journeys were not very long but from six to eight leagues. The heat made them seem longer, as well as our fatigue because the Portuguese were unused to it. They never met any people, nor did they want to.

=== Khodja Murad's account on Dankali ===
In 1685 Ludolf had submitted a questionnaire to Khodja Murad surrounding the port of Baylul which he had asked whether any ships had sailed there and from where. Khodja replied empathetically that the only ships sailing to Baylul were jalbas, or large local vessels that arrived there yearly. They came from Mokha and nowhere else, and which carried Arabs and Abyssinians who came to barter coarse linen for butter, sheep and other small merchandise.

Murad then later gave additional information during his journey to Batavia in 1689 that he had observed Ethiopia's shores were all occupied by the Turks with the sole exception of Baylul. Elaborating the status and trade of the port and on the relations between the Ethiopian Emperor and the Danakil king.

The port of Beilul in the small kingdom of Dankale, still belongs to the emperor of Ethiopia, but is kept as a fief by a Muslim Kaffir, who leaves his children as a pledge with the emperor to pay an annual tribute. But the inhabitants there and in the surrounding regions are savage Kaffirs and mostly Muslims, no Christians are found there nor many Muslim merchants up country as in Matsua(Massawa) because of the bad reception and great extortions. There is however a moderate navigation from Mocha, Aden etc. whose inhabitants, the Arabs, come there with their ships, taking provisions of corn, butter, honey and also tusks, cow-hides and civet, which together with a few slaves are brought there from the highlands and are exchanged for spices, pepper, broadcloath, etc.

Reverting to conditions in the Afar country on a later visit to Batavia, in 1697, Murad had reiterated that the Danakil king continued to be "subject to the emperor of Abyssinia". As for Baylul he describes it as:

A tiny little town, three or four miles from the sea, and consisted of no more than fifty or sixty small houses. They were inhabited by "wild people" with "a religion of their own" who walk around "completely naked", but who, when sitting, covered their nakedness with a piece of cloth. They were subject to the Ethiopian Emperor and Baylul was in his possession. Caravans from Baylul had once travelled to and from the interior but the port by then had been completely desolate . Good fat sheep and big pigs could nevertheless be obtained there cheaply, in exchange for coarse imported cloth.

=== Hasan ibn Ahmad Al Haymi's account on Dankali ===
The Yemeni ambassador to Ethiopia was required to pass through Baylul in order to reach Abyssinia by recommendation of Emperor Fasilides in 1647. He spent two months in the region and had reported that it was under the control of Sultan Shuhaym ibn Kamil Al-Dankali. Shuhaym was the son of the previous ruler Kamil and was also a Muslim. However the envoy claimed that he was Muslim in "name only", for he scarcely followed the prescriptions of Islam. He was said to have been married, perhaps partially for dynastic reasons, to twelve women. Some of his subjects, Al Haymi complains, also had more than the number of wives prescribed in Islam.

Al-Haymi, a proud Yemeni, was no sympathetic observer unlike Khodja Murad. He considered the Dankali "repulsive in appearance" and complains that they were "all of them naked, not covering their nakedness", and that among them relations between sexes were "promiscuous". He added, even more arrogantally, that the Afar language was "barbaric". Those who had lived at Mokha, he was pleased to report, nevertheless often knew Arabic. The nomads of the interior, on the other hand, were less sophisticated. They were, he claims, "utterly (ghaya) astonished at the firing of muskets", and, anticipating the coming of the machine-gun by two centuries, "firmly believed that the marksman, when he had shot, was able to continue shooting without operation and that no time passed between each of the two shots". Though advised to use Baylul the Yämani envoy concluded, like Lobo, that the route inland was "full of dangers", notably from the Oromos.

=== Collapse of the kingdom ===
In the later half of the 16th century during the Great Oromo Migrations, the Baraytuma Oromo had led continuous raids into the kingdom which destabilised it and resulted in the kingdom to be more dependent on the Ethiopian Empire.

During the course of this expansion in the 17th century, the Baraytuma Oromo penetrated the Dankali Kingdom in several areas and had already reached the Dankali coast near Assab, thereby perpetuating the division between the southern Danakil and northern Danakil populations. Thus in the 18th century, the Dankali Kingdom had lost the salt plains of Arho, and the northern tribes had chosen to obey their elders of each clan. In the south, this had caused the kingdom to fracture into a smaller number of insignificant sultanates.

The Dankali Kingdom remained weak but continued to exist in areas that extended from Beilul to Dahlak, including the Buri Peninsula, and some parts of Doka'a near the border with Tigray continuing to lose land due to the hegemony of the Turks who had prevented evasion of their toll by blocking the use of Beilul's port. By then, the Dankali had retreated to a small section of the Buri Peninsula.

== Economy ==
Bars of rock-salt known as Amolé were mined in the Afar depression, which had been used instead of money throughout the highlands. The term according to the Italian lexicographer Guidi stated that the name perhaps came from the name of an Afar tribe. The greatest asset of the Danakil kingdom was the salt plains of Arho, which supplied the plateau with most of the raw salt consumed by the population and their cattle, and with all their salt blocks(Amolé) harvested being used as currency beyond the frontiers of Ethiopia

According to James Bruce, the commerce of the kingdom in earlier times, when trade with India flourished, the Danakil king's revenue had come chiefly from furnishing camels for the transportation of merchandise from the interior. Afar trade by his day, however, was in decline. It was largely confined to the age-old carriage of bars of rock salt, which were excavated in the Afar lowlands, and had to be transported through the "dry and burning deserts". This entailed great risk from being murdered by the Galla, before being delivered to the nearest highland market, and earned only "a moderate profit".

== Major Towns ==
=== Capital ===
- Dankali

=== Port Towns ===
- Beilul
- Assab
- Vella

Other Settlements

- Degibelcora
- Degibeldara
- Babel
- Zagnani
- Zama
