= Doba (historical region) =

Historic state in modern Ethiopia

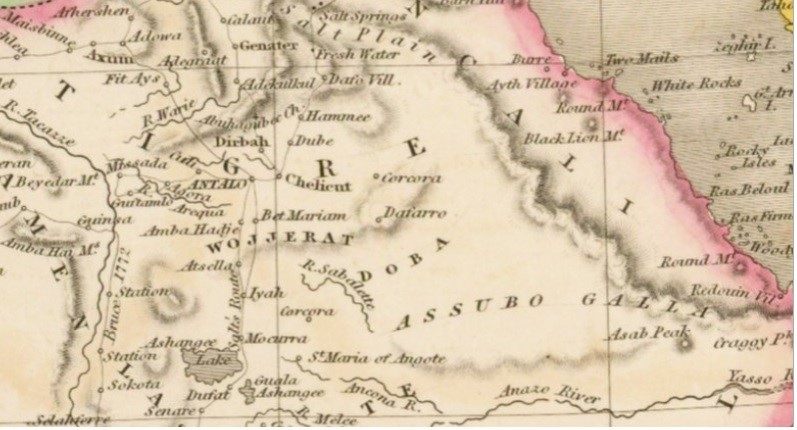
1828 map by Sidney Hall illustrating Doba region bordered by Tigray in the north and Assubo Galla (Oromo) in the south

Doba (Amharic: ዶባ, Afar: Dobaq) also known as the Country of Dobas was a historical Muslim region in central modern Ethiopia. Historian Fesseha Berhe associates Doba with the Saho people. Historian John Trimingham argues that the people of Doba were of Afar stock.

The people of Doba are considered extinct today. According to George Huntingford, Doba appeared to have come from the name of a people who inhabited the area, the Dobe'a, rather than a region.

== History ==
Doba was mostly populated by pastoralists known as the Dobe'a.

The people of Doba are linked to the Argobba aristocracy of Walasma. Argobba people consider the inhabitants of Doba their ancestors. Doba territory was within the 13th century Ifat state.

In the 14th century Doba neighbored Tigray, Angot, and Amhara regions of modern Ethiopia.

According to Ayele Tariku, in the 1400s emperor Yeshaq I had placed a military battalion called Jan Amora near Doba country to protect the Abyssinian frontier against attacks from the people of Doba.

During the reign of Emperor Baeda Maryam I in the late fifteenth century, the Doba bordering Angot are recorded to have disrupted crucial roads used for Abyssinian trade. Baeda Maryam I would incorporate the Doba peoples into his army after invading their region.

Doba are reported to have lived in Tigray Province in the 16th century.

Later in the seventeenth century the induction of upland Doba and Harla peoples into Afar identity led to the emergence of the Aussa Sultanate. During the reign of Emperor Iyasu II in the 1700s, Doba warriors attacked the Abyssinian frontier.

In 1809, British explorer Henry Salt who had visited Doba declared that it was an extensive uncultivated plain and had stated that the inhabitants were a tribe which were an isolated group of "negroes" who were considered as a formidable set of marauders but had been experiencing difficulties maintaining independence.

Contemporary archaeologists discovered several ruins in the Chercher area called Doba (modern eastern Oromia) consisting of the districts Kubi, Addas, Mito, Djugola and Abadir dating back to the eighth century, and are linked to the Harla people. The Doba people appear to have been pushed out of the Chercher region by the Oromo in the following centuries.

== See also ==
- Dobe'a
- History of Ethiopia
