= Nicolò Brancaleon =

Italian painter

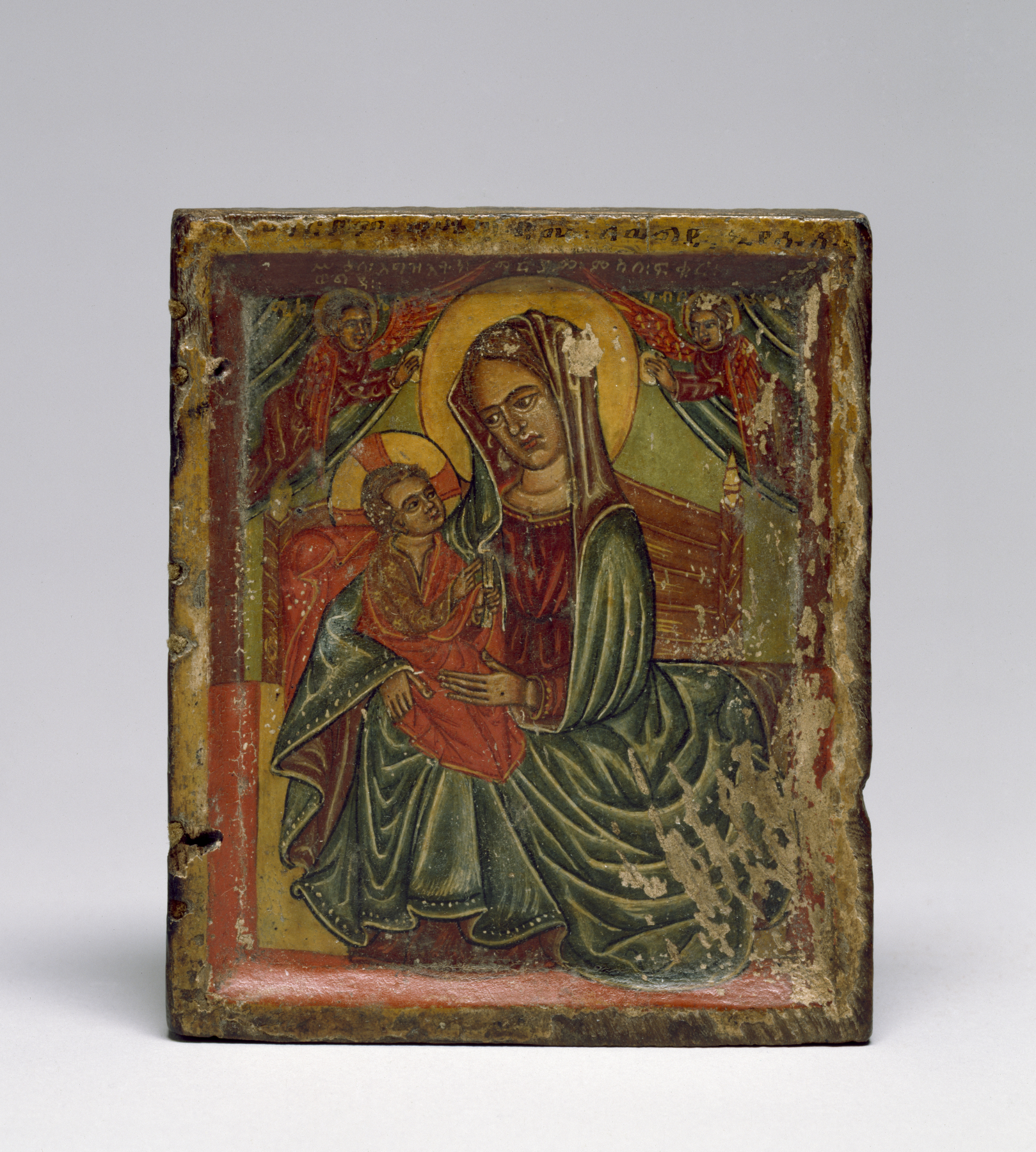
Virgin and Child by Nicolò Brancaleon, from right half of a diptych, Walters Art Museum, 1500

Nicolò Brancaleon (c.1460 – after 1526) was a painter born in Venice, who adopted the art style in Ethiopia from the reign of Baeda Maryam onwards. During his lifetime in Ethiopia, he was commonly called "Marqorewos".

Evidence of his life before arriving in Ethiopia has not been found, according to Paul B. Henze. E. A. Wallis Budge, in his preface to the second edition of his translation of the Kebra Nagast, claims that Brancaleon was a monk who had come to Ethiopia to convert Emperor Zara Yaqob and debated Abba Giyorgis several times on religious matters; (Wallis Budge may have misremembered James Bruce's statement about Abba Giyorgis's opponent in that religious debate, "We are not informed of the name of Abba George's antagonist, but he is thought to have been a Venetian painter, who lived many years after in Abyssinia, and, it is believed, died there"—explicitly identifying him as Brancaleon in a footnote.) Francisco Álvares, who met Brancaleon while accompanying the Portuguese ambassador on his mission to Lebna Dengel in the 1520s, wrote that "they say he was a monk before he came to this country".

Brancaleon arrived in Ethiopia between 1480 and 1482, according to an account of Francesco Suriano, who had visited the country, written in the latter year. When he arrived at the court of the Emperor (who was at the time encamped at Barar, which O.G.S. Crawford located to the southwest of modern Addis Ababa), Suriano found 14 Europeans residing at the court, among whom was "Master Nicolo Branchalion".

By the time Álvares met Brancaleon, the painter was very wealthy and well known in Ethiopia — although forbidden by the Emperor to ever leave the country. By this time, he had founded a studio and was unchallenged in his skill at painting icons, illustrating books, and decorating churches. "Brancaleon's images of the martyrdom of Saint George and of the miracles of the Virgin Mary remained fashionable until the eighteenth century."

His best known work was a painting of the Madonna and Child that decorated the church of Atronsa Maryam, which caused much controversy. Beckingham and Huntingford, in their notes to their translation of Álvares account, repeat the account from the Paris Chronicle that Brancaleon's work

gave great offense to the Ethiopians because the Child was held in His Mother's left arm, the left being considered to be of lower status than the right. (But there are many Ethiopian pictures in which the Child is carried in the left arm, and it may be that in this case He was really shown in the right arm, which seen from the front might be described as the "left".)

The painting, however, survived for several centuries until it was destroyed in 1704, along with the church, by an Oromo raid.

In 1973, the traveller Diana Spencer discovered some examples of Brancaleon's works at Wafa Yesus and at the nearby monastery of Getisamani in the Goncha Gorge, including a work by a previously unknown Ethiopian apprentice. Henze reports that he and Stanislaw Chojnacki verified that these works survived the Derg era. "Though much has been learned about Ethiopian religious art in recent decades, it is still a challenging field where important new discoveries are likely to be made."

Brancaleon is one of the few 15th century artists from Ethiopia whose name is known, in addition to ethiopian painter Fere Seyon
