= Battle of Amba Alagi (1941) =

WW2 East Africa campaign 1941

- Part of the East African campaign of World War II
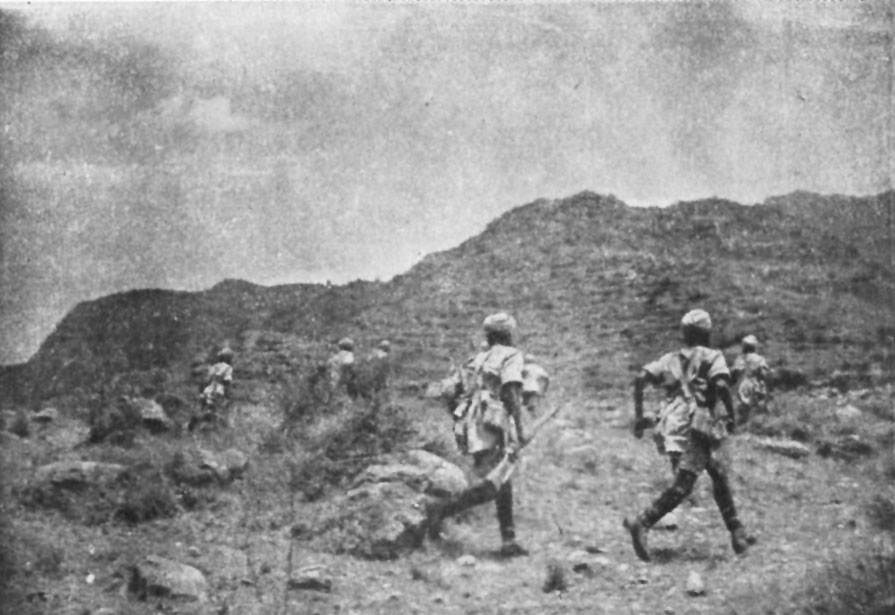
- Indian troops running to Amba Alagi
Date	4–19 May 1941
Location	Amba Alagi, Italian East Africa 12°59′N 39°33′E
Result	Allied victory

Belligerents
Italy: Italian East Africa	United Kingdom: British Raj South Africa Ethiopian Empire

Commanders and leaders
Prince Amedeo, Duke of Aosta (POW)	(United Kingdom) Sir Alan Cunningham (United Kingdom) William Platt (United Kingdom) Mosley Mayne

Strength
7,000 (4,000 Italians and 3,000 colonials)	41,000 (regulars & irregulars)

Casualties and losses
3,500 killed or wounded, all survivors captured	Unknown

The Battle of Amba Alagi was fought in May 1941, during World War II, part of the East African Campaign. After the Italian defeat at Keren in April 1941, Prince Amedeo, Duke of Aosta withdrew his forces to the mountain stronghold at Amba Alagi. The mountain had galleries carved into the rock to protect the defending troops and hold ample ammunition and stores and the Italian troops thought themselves to be impregnable. According to other sources, however, the fortress was easily defendable thanks to its position and the mountainous terrain, but lacked food and water, so that Marshal Enrico Caviglia later criticised the Duke for having chosen it for his last stand, calling the Amba Alagi "uno scoglio senz'acqua e senza viveri" ("a rock with neither water nor food"). The initial attacks on the approaches to Amba Alagi by British troops under Major-General Mayne from the north, commenced on 4 May with a pincer from the eastern and western sides.

There was hard fighting in the jagged mountainous terrain but Mayne's troops were joined on 12 May by Brigadier Dan Pienaar's 1st South African Brigade, which had captured the Italian garrison of Dessie (20 April) located 200 miles (320 km) south of Amba Alagi, and by 14 May Amba Alagi was completely surrounded. A final assault was planned for the next day but a lucky strike by an artillery shell hit an Italian fuel dump, sending a stream of oil into the last remaining Italian drinking water, forcing the garrison to end its resistance.

The Italian commander began ceasefire negotiations on 16 May 1941. The Duke of Aosta and his garrison surrendered to the British commander, Lieutenant-General Sir Alan Cunningham, on 19 May 1941. The Duke and the garrison were accorded the honours of war. This capitulation marked the end of any significant Italian control on East Africa, although some garrisons would continue to fight until 1943.

The film La pattuglia dell'Amba Alagi, shot in 1953 by Flavio Calzavara, glorifies the Italian defence against the British.

== Gallery ==
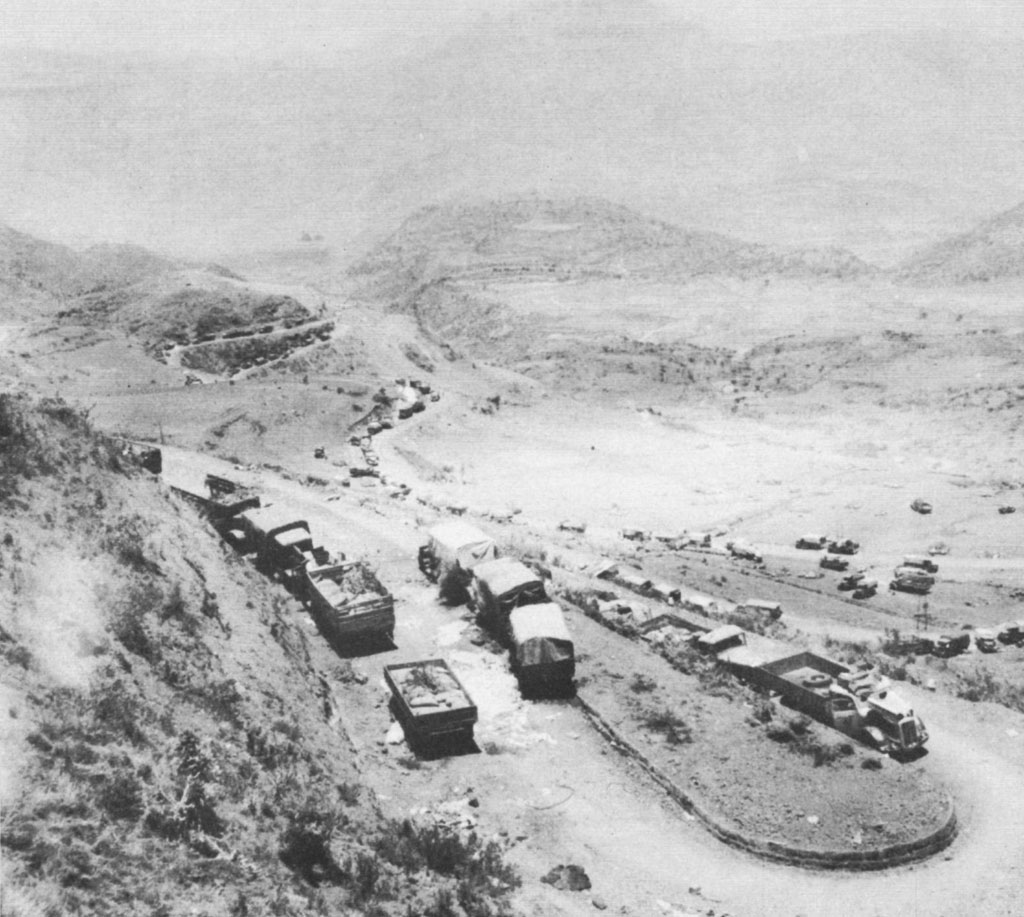
Italian vehicles abandoned on the road to Amba Alagi.

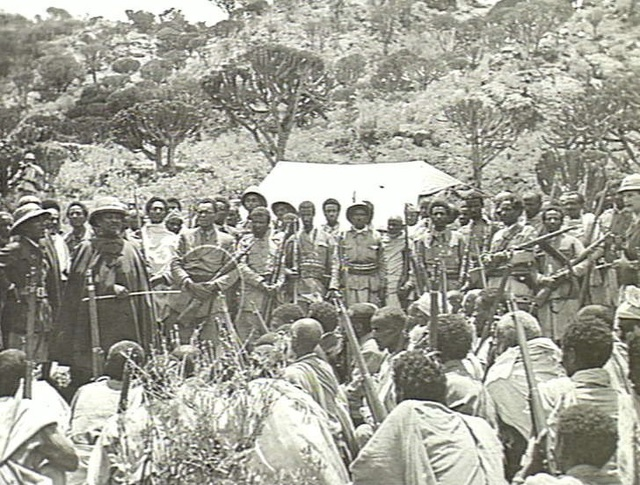
Seyoum Mengesha speaks to Ethiopian irregulars under his command.

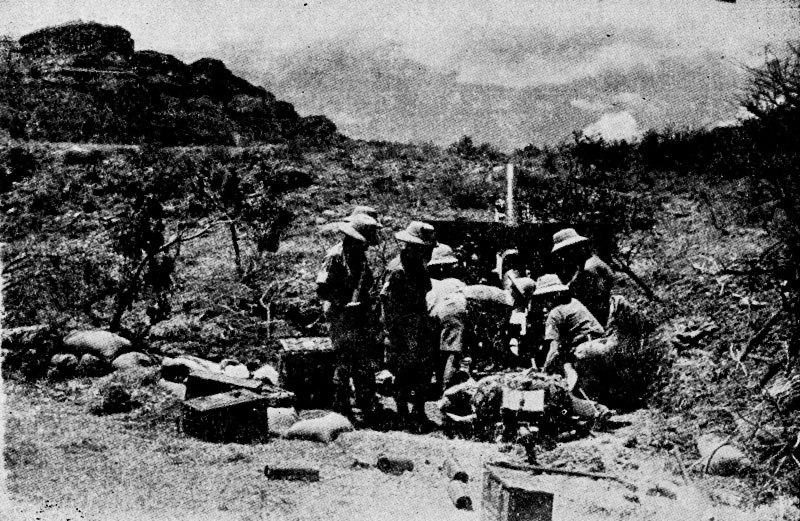
South African 25-pounder gun fires on Amba Alagi.

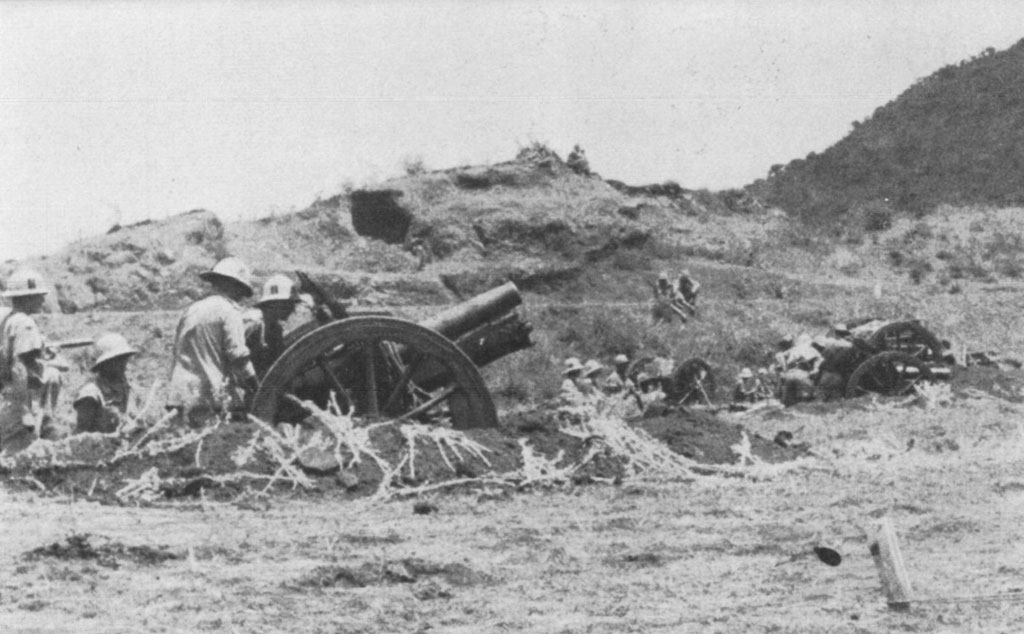
A battery of 4.5-inch howitzers from the South African Army's 4th Field Brigade in action.

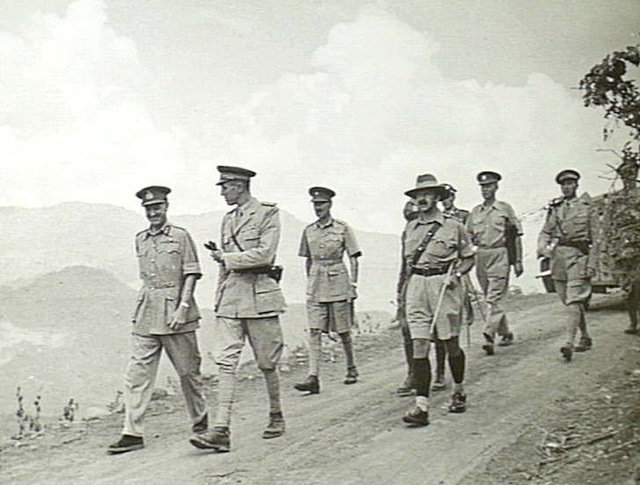
Prince Amedeo speaks to Mosley Mayne (leftmost) during the surrender.

== See also ==
- List of British military equipment of World War II
- List of Second Italo-Ethiopian War weapons of Ethiopia-Arbegnoch used Ethiopian and captured Italian weapons.
- List of Italian Army equipment in World War II

== Sources ==
- Mackenzie, Compton (1951). Eastern Epic: September 1939 – March 1943 Defence. Vol. I. London: Chatto & Windus. OCLC 59637091.
- Diamond, John. Archibald Wavell. Osprey Pub, 2012.
- Jaques, Tony. Dictionary of Battles and Sieges. Westport, Conn. Greenwood, 2007
- Shinn, David Hamilton., Thomas P. Ofcansky, and Chris Prouty. Historical Dictionary of Ethiopia. Lanham, MD: Scarecrow, 2004.
