= Ambalage =

- Town
- Flag

- Location within Ethiopia
- Coordinates: 12°56′N 39°31′E
- Country: Ethiopia
- Region: Tigray
- Elevation: 2,450 m (8,040 ft)
- Time zone: UTC+3 (EAT)

Ambalage is a town in southern Tigray, Ethiopia. This town has a latitude and longitude of 12°56′N 39°31′E with an elevation of 2445 to 2480 meters above sea level and is located along Ethiopian Highway 2. Ambalage is located just south of the mountain Amba Alagi, from which the name of the town was derived. An 'amba' is a flat-topped mountain (mesa).

== History ==
During the Woyane rebellion in 1943, Basha Gugusa, one of the first Woyanne leaders, led the battle of Ambalage in September 1943. In that battle, the rebels gained victory over the Imperial army which was well equipped and supported by British air power. The Weyane forces outnumbered those of the government, but their advantage in numbers was offset by artillery and British air power.

== Geography ==
Ambalage is located on the north shore of a stream which runs west towards the Tekeze. Just north of Ambalage, the highway climbs to a height of 3090 meter at the Alagi Pass near the mountain Amba Alagi. Towards the south (Dessie), the road climbs more gently to a height of 2990 meter before going down to Maychew.

Ambalage is in the Southern Zone of the Tigray Region.
