= 1487 =

1487 in various calendars
- Gregorian calendar: 1487; MCDLXXXVII
- Ab urbe condita: 2240
- Armenian calendar: 936; ԹՎ ՋԼԶ
- Assyrian calendar: 6237
- Balinese saka calendar: 1408–1409
- Bengali calendar: 893–894
- Berber calendar: 2437
- English Regnal year: 2 Hen. 7 – 3 Hen. 7
- Buddhist calendar: 2031
- Burmese calendar: 849
- Byzantine calendar: 6995–6996
- Chinese calendar: 丙午年 (Fire Horse); 4184 or 3977 — to — 丁未年 (Fire Goat); 4185 or 3978
- Coptic calendar: 1203–1204
- Discordian calendar: 2653
- Ethiopian calendar: 1479–1480
- Hebrew calendar: 5247–5248
- Hindu calendars
- Vikram Samvat: 1543–1544
- Shaka Samvat: 1408–1409
- Kali Yuga: 4587–4588
- Holocene calendar: 11487
- Igbo calendar: 487–488
- Iranian calendar: 865–866
- Islamic calendar: 891–893
- Japanese calendar: Bunmei 19 / Chōkyō 1 (長享元年)
- Javanese calendar: 1403–1404
- Julian calendar: 1487; MCDLXXXVII
- Korean calendar: 3820
- Minguo calendar: 425 before ROC 民前425年
- Nanakshahi calendar: 19
- Thai solar calendar: 2029–2030
- Tibetan calendar: མེ་ཕོ་རྟ་ལོ་ (male Fire-Horse); 1613 or 1232 or 460 — to — མེ་མོ་ལུག་ལོ་ (female Fire-Sheep); 1614 or 1233 or 461

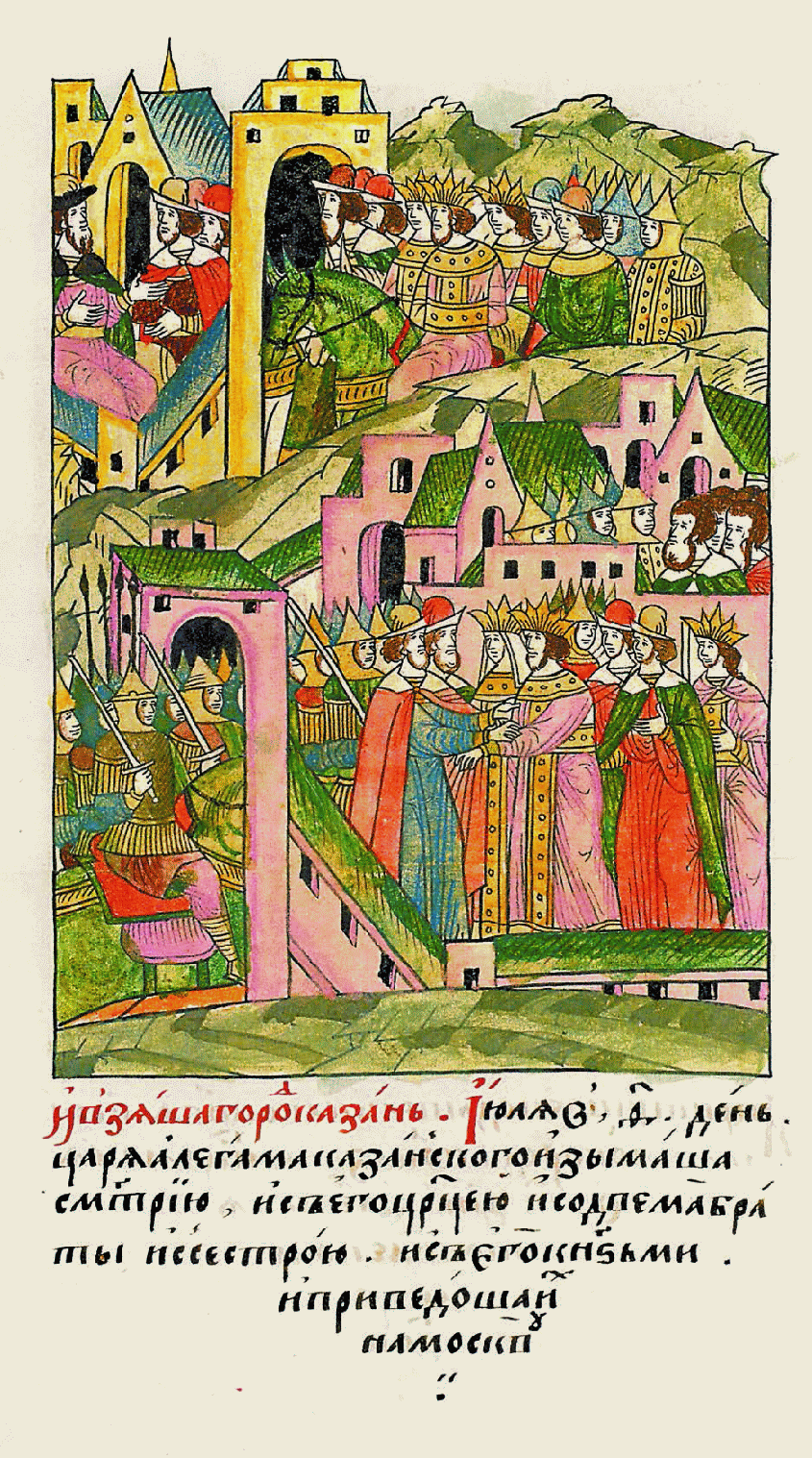
July 9: Russia conquers the Khanate of Kazan.

Year 1487 (MCDLXXXVII) was a common year starting on Monday of the Julian calendar.

== Events ==
=== January–March ===
- January 29 – Richard Foxe becomes Bishop of Exeter.
- February 2 – Acting on rumors of a rebellion in England, led by a person posing as Edward Plantagenet, 17th Earl of Warwick, King Henry VII convenes a meeting of the Privy Council at Sheen Palace in Richmond, to discuss a response to the situation. The first measure is to bring Edward, son of the last Earl of Warwick, out of imprisonment at the Tower of London and to parade him through London to dispel the rumors.
- February 8 – Arrest warrants for treason are issued by the English Privy Council for Henry Bodrugan, John Beaumont and other persons accused of having traveled to the counties of Devon and Cornwall to "stir up sedition and rebellion.
- February 11 – Pope Innocent VIII renews the designation of Tomás de Torquemada as the Grand Inquisitor of Spain in the kingdoms of Castile, Leon, Aragon, and Valencia.
- February 26 – At the insistence of Cardinal Rodrigo de Borja Pope Innocent VIII, authorizes a Christian crusade and against the Muslim Moors, to start on September 1 and to be funded for one year.
- March 6 – Cardinal John Morton, Archbishop of Canterbury since January 21, becomes the new Lord Chancellor of England, succeeding the late Thomas Bourchier.
- March 27 – Pope Innocent VIII issues an order designating the Roman Catholic Archbishop of St. Andrews, Robert Blackadder, as the Primate of All Scotland, outraging the bishops in Glasgow and the rest of Scotland.
- March – Sigismund, Archduke of Austria, largely on the poor advice of his counselors, declares war on Venice, and seizes silver mines in and around the Sugana Valley.

=== April–June ===
- April 27 – In Spain, the town of Vélez in Muslim Granada becomes the first conquest by the invasion by Christian Castile and Aragon, surrendering after 10 days.
- April 28 – In the Battle of Crevola, the Milanese forces defeated the Swiss.
- May 7 –
  - After failed attempts by King Ferdinand of Aragon to negotiate Granada's surrender of the city of Malaqa, the siege of Málaga begins, with the Granadan General Hamet el Zegri defending against a larger contingent of Aragonese and Castilian troops. At the same time, the Spanish fleet blocks the harbor and all access to Malaga from the sea. The city surrenders after three months.
  - The Kingdom of Portugal dispatches Pêro da Covilhã and Afonso de Paiva across Europe and Africa to inquire about a sea route to India, as well as to inquire about the enigmatic Prester John. Covilha reaches Ethiopia but is not allowed to leave, while de Paiva is never heard from again.
- May 24 – Lambert Simnel, a supporter of the late King Richard III who is leading a rebellion against King Henry VII, is crowned King "Edward VI of England" in Christ Church Cathedral, Dublin, Ireland. He claims to be Edward Plantagenet, 17th Earl of Warwick, and challenges Henry VII for the throne of England, where he lands on June 5.
- May 18 – The army of the Grand Principality of Moscow begins the siege of Kazan as troops led by Daniil Kholmsky after a dispute begins over the succession to the throne of the Khanate of Kazan.
- May 19 – The witch-hunters' manual Malleus Maleficarum, written by Heinrich Kramer with Jacob Sprenger, is approved by Catholic theologians from the University of Cologne and at Speyer in the Holy Roman Empire. The preface states that all readers should know that "in the year since the Birth of Our Lord 1487, in the fifth indiction, on Saturday, the 19th day of May, at five in the afternoon or thereabouts," professors Henricus Institoris and Jacobus Sprenger certified the text on behalf of Pope Innocent VIII. The preface notes that although some preachers of the Word of God claim in sermons "that sorceresses do not exist", the authors' intention is "to alleviate this ignorance" and to "exterminate the sorceresses" by "appropriate methods of sentencing."
- May 27 – At Chiang Mai, in what is now part of northern Thailand, King of Lan Na, Prince Yotchiangrai becomes the new reigning monarch upon the death of his father, King Tilokaraj.
- June 5 – The rebel army led by Lambert Simnel, who has proclaimed himself as "King Edward VI" lands on Piel Island at Lancashire.
- June 16 – At the Battle of Stoke Field: the army of the pretender Lambert Simnel, led by John de la Pole, Earl of Lincoln, and Francis Lovell, 1st Viscount Lovell, is crushed by troops loyal to Henry VII.
- June 19 – French–Breton War: The siege of the city of Nantes in the Duchy of Brittany is started by King Charles VIII of France, but fails after less than two months and is lifted on August 6.

=== July–September ===
- July 9 – The Khanate of Khazan surrenders after a siege of seven weeks, and Khazan becomes a vassal of the Russians in the Grand Principality of Moscow.
- July 11 – The Battle of Aldy Charrish takes place in Scotland as the Clan Mackay defeats the Clan Ross.
- August 6 – French–Breton War: King Charles VIII of France ends the siege of Nantes after seven weeks.
- August 10 – The County of Tyrol within the Holy Roman Empire defeats the attack of the Republic of Venice at the Battle of Calliano, with 1,400 of the Venetians and 700 of the Tyroleans killed.
- August 11 – The Papal States and the Kingdom of Naples sign a peace treaty to end the war that had started a year and half earlier.
- August 13 – The siege of Málaga ends, when the Spanish take the Granadan city. Most of the 11,000 surviving residents are taken prisoner and then sold into slavery in Castile and Andalusia.
- August 17 – Wiener Neustadt, the last town in Lower Austria to resist Hungary's King Matthias Corvinus, surrenders to his army.
- August 18 – The Catholic Monarchs Ferdinand and Isabella make a triumphant entrance into the newly captured city of Malaga.
- August – Bartolomeu Dias leaves Lisbon, on his voyage to the Cape of Good Hope.
- September 9 – Zhu Youcheng becomes the new Ming Dynasty Emperor of China upon the death of his father Zhu Jianru[, bringing an end to the Chengua era and beginning the Hongzhi era.

=== October–December ===
- October 1 – Royal assent is given by King James III of Scotland to acts passed by the Scottish Parliament, including the Royal Burghs Act 1487 (requiring annual meetings of the commissioners of Scotland's town governments); the annexation of Lochmaben Castle; the Sea Fishing Act (regulating the herring industry); and the Goods of Convicts Act (allowing the confiscation of possessions of persons arrested for trespassing).
- November 9 – The second parliament of King Henry VII assembles at Westminster with John Mondurant as Speaker of the House of Commons. The parliament lasts for slightly more than five weeks.
- November 30 – Duke Albert IV of Bavaria promulgates the Reinheitsgebot, specifying three ingredients – water, malt and hops – for the brewing of beer.
- December 8 – Bartolomeu Dias and his crew, sailing southward along the African coast in the caravels São Cristóvão and São Pantaleão arrive at what is now Namibia's Walvis Bay, which Dias calls O Golfo de Santa Maria da Conceição.
- December 16 – The war between Hungary and Austria is ended with an armistice signed at Sankt Pölten between Duke Albert III of Saxony (on behalf of the Holy Roman Empire) and Hungary's King Matthias Corvinus.
- December 18 – The second parliament of King Henry VII is dissolved in England after 39 days.
- December 19 – (7 Panquetzaliztli of the year 8 acatl) During the reign of the Mexican Aztec Emperor Ahuitzotl, the Temple of Huitzilopochtli, sixth in a series is completed and dedicated in Tenochtitlan to the Aztec god of war.
- December 31 – Pope Innocent VIII establishes the office of the Secretary of State of the Vatican by approving the apostolic constitution Non Debet Reprehensibile, with 24 apostolic secretaries, the most important being the Secretarius Domesticus.

=== Date unknown ===
- Italian architects work on the Moscow Kremlin.
- Stockport Grammar School is founded, in the north of England.

== Births ==
- February 7 – Queen Dangyeong, Korean royal consort (d. 1557)
- February 8 – Ulrich, Duke of Württemberg (d. 1550)
- February 15 – Henry of the Palatinate, bishop of Utrecht (d. 1552)
- April 10 – William I of Nassau-Siegen (d. 1559)
- July 5 – Johann Gramann, German theologian (d. 1541)
- July 17 – Ismail I, Shah of Persia (d. 1524)
- August 27 – Anna of Brandenburg, Duchess of Schleswig and Holstein (d. 1514)
- September 10 – Pope Julius III (d. 1555)
- October 5 – Ludwig of Hanau-Lichtenberg, German nobleman (d. 1553)
- November 14 – John III of Pernstein, Bohemian land-owner, Governor of Moravia and Count of Kladsko (d. 1548)
- date unknown
  - Amda Seyon II, Emperor of Ethiopia (d. 1494)
  - Magdalena de la Cruz, Franciscan nun of Cordova (d. 1560)
  - Fray Tomás de Berlanga, Bishop of Panama (d. 1551)
  - Piotr Gamrat, Polish Catholic archbishop (d. 1545)
  - Pedro de Mendoza, Spanish conquistador (d. 1537)
  - Michael Stifel, German mathematician (d. 1567)
  - Giovanni da Udine, Italian painter (d. 1564)
  - Peter Vischer the Younger, German sculptor (d. 1528)

== Deaths ==
- March 21 – Nicholas of Flüe, Swiss hermit and saint (b. 1417)
- May 27 – Tilokaraj, king of Lan Na (b. 1409)
- June 16 – John de la Pole, 1st Earl of Lincoln (b. c. 1463)
- June 26 – John Argyropoulos, Greek philosopher
- July 16 – Charlotte, Queen of Cyprus (b. 1436)
- August 23 – Maria of Cleves, French noble (b. 1426)
- September 9 – Chenghua Emperor of China (b. 1447)
- September 14 – Mara Branković, Serbian princess (b. 1416)
- September 30 – John Sutton, 1st Baron Dudley, Lord Lieutenant of Ireland (b. 1400)
- October 22 – Antonio Bettini, Italian religious writer (b. 1396)
- date unknown
  - William FitzAlan, 16th Earl of Arundel (b. 1417)
  - Tlacaelel, high priest of Tenochtitlán (b. 1398)
