= Amba Alagi =

Mountain (amba) in northern Ethiopia

Amba Alaje
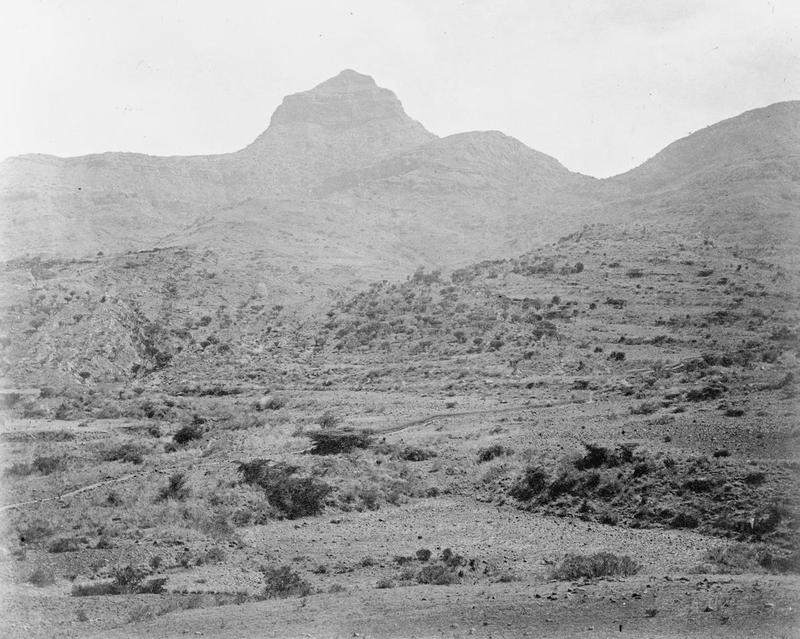
- Amba Alaje, near Atsela. Photograph taken by 10th Company, RE of the British Army in 1868

Highest point
- Elevation: 3,438 m (11,280 ft)
- Coordinates: 12°59′39″N 39°30′13″E

Naming
- Native name: እምባ ኣላጀ (Tigrinya)

Geography
- Location within Ethiopia
- Location: Debubawi (Southern) Zone, Tigray Region, Ethiopia

Imba Alaje is a mountain, or an amba, in northern Ethiopia. Located in the Debubawi Zone of the Tigray Region, Imba Alaje dominates the roadway that runs past it from the city of Mek'ele south to Maychew. Because of its strategic location, Emba Alaje has been the site of several battles. As Anthony Mockler describes it,

It was [a] real amba, flat-topped, covered with crevices and canyons and caves, impregnable on the north and north-east where the Tug Gabat ran round its flanks through precipitous ravines, falling steeply away in the rear to the spur of Antalo, behind which lay the broad plain of Mahera.

The village of Adi Gura is located on the north side of the mountain at an elevation of 2,700 meter. The larger town of Ambalage is located five kilometer to the south of the mountain.

== Geology ==
The mountain is largely composed of Alaji Basalts, the youngest succession of the Ethiopian flood basalts. The most recent flows are only 15 million years old. The geological formation was called after Imba Alaje by geologist William Thomas Blanford, who accompanied the British Expedition to Abyssinia in 1868. In roadcuts, there are conspicuous outcrops of whitish interbedded lacustrine sedimentary deposits.

== Hydrology ==
There are many springs on the slopes of the mountain. On the northern flank at Addi Gura'i, the Mercy water bottling plant is located.

== Alagi Pass ==
Just three kilometers to the southeast of the top of Amba Alagi is the Alagi Pass. Here, the Ethiopian Highway 2 crosses the mountain ridge at an elevation of 3,090 meter above sea level. To the south, the road starts climbing from Ambalage at 2,450 meters.

== History ==
The first mention of Imba Alaje is in the Chronicle of Emperor Baeda Maryam (1468–1478 AD), who personally led an expedition against the Dobe'a, who lived around Imba Alaje and raided the caravan routes. In the early 19th century, Ras Wolde Selassie controlled the amba, and used it on 18 August 1811 to imprison Gebre Guro, the brother of Sabagadis, for 18 months because he had rebelled against the Ras. The road built from the coast south to Magdala during the British 1868 Expedition to Abyssinia passed through Imba Alaje. A generation later, the mountain was the scene of a battle in February 1889 between Ras Alula Engida and Ras Seyoum Gebre in which Alula was wounded.

=== First Battle of Imba Alaje ===
The first Battle of Imba Alaje occurred in December 1895. On December 7, 30,000 Ethiopians destroyed an Italian column of 2,350 led by Pietro Toselli and a day later, on December 8, the Ethiopian emperor, Menelik II, drove out the Italian forces of General Oreste Baratieri. After the defeat, the Italians withdrew from Imba Alaje to their half-finished fort at Mekele which Menelik then besieged for 15 days (6–21 January 1896).

=== Second Battle of Imba Alaje ===
The second Battle of Imba Alaje was fought in May 1941, during World War II, part of the East African Campaign. The mountain had galleries carved into the rock to protect the defending troops and hold ample ammunition and stores. The defenders, Italian troops under command of the Viceroy, the Duke of Aosta, thought themselves to be impregnable. The initial attacks on the approaches to Amba Alagi by British troops under Major-General Mayne from the north, commenced on May 4 with a pincer from the eastern and western sides. There was hard fighting in the jagged mountainous terrain. Mayne's troops were joined on May 12 by Brigadier Dan Pienaar's 1st South African Brigade, which had captured the Italian garrison of Dessie (April 20) located 200 miles south of Imba Alaje, and by May 14 Imba Alaje was completely surrounded. A final assault was planned for the next day but a lucky strike by an artillery shell hit an Italian fuel dump, sending a stream of oil into their last remaining drinking water and forcing the garrison's surrender.

The film La Pattuglia dell'Amba Alagi, shot in 1953 by Flavio Calzavara, glorifies the Italian defense against the British.

=== Third Battle of Amba Alagi ===
In 1943, Imba Alaje was the location of the decisive battle of the "Woyane Rebellion" in Enderta Province. After capturing Mek'ele, the Woyane rebels swept south to the mountain where they encountered a government force consisting of 2,000 regular soldiers and 8,000 territorials. From 18 September through 6 October 1943, rebels under the personal leadership of Blatta Haile Mariam Redda repeatedly stormed the government positions, until artillery barrages and British Blenheim bombers at last dispersed the rebels.
