= Na'od =

Emperor of Ethiopia from 1494 to 1507

Na'od ዐፄ ናዖድ

Emperor of Ethiopia
- Reign: 26 October 1494 – 31 July 1507
- Predecessor: Amda Seyon II
- Successor: Dawit II
- Issue: Lebna Dengel; Victor; Jacob; Claudius; Minas
- Dynasty: House of Solomon
- Father: Baeda Maryam I
- Religion: Ethiopian Orthodox

Na'od (Ge'ez: ናዖድ) was Emperor of Ethiopia from 1494 to 31 July 1507, and a member of the Solomonic dynasty. His regnal name was Anbasa Bazar. His reign was marked by internal tension between territories with the assistance of Queen Eleni. He began construct an extravagant church in Amhara province, called Mekane Selassie. The church was completed by his successor Dawit II in 1530.

== Reign ==
Na'od was the second son of Baeda Maryam I and his second wife Kalyupe (also called "Calliope"), and was born at Gabarge.

Like Eskender before him, he relied on the counsel of the Queen Mother Eleni. Despite her help, his reign was marked by internal dissension.

Na'od was very talented in Amharic and Ge'ez poetry. He was also a notable author who wrote a number of religious books.

Na'od began construction on a lavish church in the Amhara province, which was decorated with gold leaf and known as Mekane Selassie (Amharic መካነ ሥላሴ meaning "abode of the Trinity"). However, he died before it was completed, and he was buried in a tomb inside the church. His son Emperor Lebna Dengel completed the construction in 1530. Francisco Álvares records seeing the church as it was being constructed, and mentions that he was kept from entering it by the local clergy. However, not long after its completion, Ahmad ibn Ibrahim pillaged the structure and set it afire on 3 November 1531.

== Military career ==
The defence of the Empire was very strong during the reign of Na'od as he scored many victories over the Muslims. G.W.B Huntingford claims that Na'od was killed near Jejeno (possibly Mekane Selassie) while campaigning against Muslim forces. However Taddesse Tamrat states that Na'od died on his way to repulse a Muslim raid in the eastern provinces.

== Family ==
Na'od had five sons:

- Lebna Dengel – Succeeded Na'od as Emperor of Ethiopia
- Victor – Half-brother of Lebna Dengel, was slain in battle
- Jacob – Predeceased Na'od
- Claudius
- Minas

== Notes ==
Regnal titles
Preceded by Amda Seyon II	Emperor of Ethiopia; 1494–1508	Succeeded by Dawit II
