= Eskender =

Emperor of Ethiopia from 1478 to 1494

Eskender ዐፄ እስክንድር

Emperor of Ethiopia
- Reign: 8 November 1478 – 7 May 1494
- Predecessor: Baeda Maryam I
- Successor: Amda Seyon II
- Regent: Romna Wark
- Born: 15 July 1471
- Died: 7 May 1494 (aged 22); Tegulet, Ethiopian Empire
- Issue: Amda Seyon II
Regnal name
- Kwestantinos II
- Dynasty: House of Solomon
- Father: Baeda Maryam I
- Mother: Romna Wark
- Religion: Ethiopian Orthodox

Eskender (Ge'ez: እስክንድር, "Alexander"; 15 July 1471 – 7 May 1494) was Emperor of Ethiopia and a member of the Solomonic dynasty. His throne name was Constantine II (Ge’ez: ቈስታንቲኖስ, ḳʷästantinos; Amharic: ቆስጠንጢኖስ, ḳosṭänṭinos). The son of Emperor Baeda Maryam I by his wife Queen Romna, his early years would see the jostling for power between the nobility and the ecclesiastical elite.

During his reign, he was involved with several battles with the Adal Sultanate. At the age of 22, his death led to civil war between the supporters of his son, Amda Seyon II and his half-brother Na'od. It was during Eskender's reign that the famed Portuguese envoy Pedro de Covilham visited his court and was later forced to stay as an advisor.

== Background ==
Due to his young age, his authority required a regent. Therefore, a council was formed of his mother Romna Wark, Tasfa Giyorgis (the abbot of the monastery of Lake Hayq), and the Bitwoded Amda Mikael. However, empress Romna withdrew from this arrangement early on, entering a convent near Debre Libanos where she lived until her death. Abbot Tasfa Giyorgis proved no match for the experienced Bitwoded, and according to Taddesse Tamrat Amda Mikael "ruled the kingdom almost single handed." The Bitwoded's rule came to an end around 1486 when a palace coup led by the Emperor's step-grandmother Queen Mother Eleni resulted in his deposition and execution. Queen Eleni thereafter played a leading role in the Emperor's government.

== Reign ==
Eskender's most significant military accomplishment was sacking Dakkar, the capital of the Adal Sultanate, when he destroyed houses and places of worship in 1478. As he led his army back home, the larger Adal army under amir Muhammad ibn Azhar ad-Din overtook them, killing many of his men and taking many prisoners. Eskender was said to have escaped capture only through the assistance of angels, and afterwards he built a church named Debere Meshwa'e (Place of Sacrifice). There is some disagreement over the context of this campaign, one view is presented by James Bruce, who adds that Zasillus, governor of Amhara, had been commanded to mobilize the forces in the south while Eskender himself raised levies from Angot and Tigray. According to Bruce, Eskender was responding to the predations of Mahfuz of Zeila. More recent scholars, such as Richard Pankhurst, hold that Eskender's sack of Dakkar led to Muhammad seeking peace with the Ethiopians, but he was outmaneuvered by Mahfuz.

There are also conflicting versions of Emperor Eskender's death, which occurred when he was only 22. One source holds he was killed fighting the Maya, a vanished ethnic group known for using poisoned arrows, east of Enderta. On the other hand, both Bruce and the explorer Richard Burton writes that Eskender was assassinated at Tegulet: Bruce stating that Zasillus of Amhara was responsible, while Burton claiming that Mahfuz had him assassinated. He was buried in the church of Atronsa Maryam, which his father had begun construction on. His early death immediately led to civil war. While the court kept the Emperor's death a secret, one major noble, Zasillus, immediately marched to the royal prison of Amba Geshen, freed Na'od, and proclaimed him Emperor. Another noble Tekle Kristos, who had remained at the Imperial court, championed Eskender's son Amda Seyon II as emperor. Although Tekle Kristos' forces defeated the followers of Zasillus, warfare continued through the realm.

== Foreign diplomacy ==
European influence was noticeable during his reign. In a manuscript written by Francesco Suriano (dated to 1482 by Somigli), Suriano describes finding 10 Italians "of good repute" residing at Eskender's court, some who had been living there for 25 years. Suriano adds that since 1480, seven more had travelled to the Ethiopian court. They had travelled there "to seek jewels and precious stones", but "since the king did not allow them to return, they were all ill content, although they were all well rewarded, each in accordance with his rank."

It was in the last years of Eskender's reign that Pêro da Covilhã arrived in Ethiopia, as an envoy from king John II of Portugal. However, da Covilhã was not allowed to return to Portugal, and was forced to live out his days in Ethiopia—although as a trusted advisor to the Emperors.

== Notes ==
Regnal titles
Preceded by Baeda Maryam I	Emperor of Ethiopia; 1478–1494	Succeeded by Amda Seyon II
