= Dobe'a =

People living in northeastern Ethiopia during medieval times

The Dobe'a were a people of medieval Ethiopia being then primary inhabitants of Doba situated in northeastern Ethiopia in what is now the Amhara, Tigray and Afar Regions. "Doba" now exists as a clan identity among the Afar people, although it isn't known whether or not they were always a part of that ethnic group.

== Homeland ==
They were first described, during the reign of Emperor Ba'eda Maryam (r. 1468–1478), as inhabiting the region between Enderta and Lake Ashenge (in Tigray Province), neighboring the Afars of the vassal Dankali Sultanate on the east. The area was described by Francisco Álvares during his stay in Ethiopia as being five days' journey (ca. 100 km) in length, and extending far into Muslim Afar territory. One of their largest towns, Manadeley, situated on the edge of the Ethiopian Highlands and overlooking the Afar lowlands, was a market town of great size. Álvares describes it as a town of "very great trade, like a city or seaport", where any good could be found, and with merchants from a number of areas, such as Jeddah, Fez, elsewhere in Morocco, Tunis, Greece, Ormus, Cairo, and India, as well as an uncountable number of people from surrounding regions in Ethiopia.

== Culture ==
The Dobe'a tended numerous high quality cows (the largest in the world, according to Álvares), and subsisted mainly on banditry and pastoralism prior to the 15th century, when they converted to an agropastoral system and many converted to Christianity as a result of Campaigns taken by Emperor Ba'eda Maryam. The Dobe'a were ruled by 24 leaders, 12 of whom were often at war and 12 at peace.

== People ==
The Dobe'a are first mentioned in the 15th century as a "black" (tselim) people, as opposed to the "red" (qeyyih) Ethiopians.

== Attacks by Emperor Ba'eda Maryam ==
Emperor Ba'eda Maryam conducted a campaign against the Dobe'a early in his reign, but they had evacuated their cattle, camels, and his campaign was unable to track down any Dobe'a. He subsequently rode into the area himself, but the Dobe'as recognized him from a distance and were able to flee, their possessions already having been evacuated. At this point, the "Dankalé," the ruler of the Danakil (vassal Dankali Sultanate), offered to intervene and help in the Emperor's campaign. He sent the Emperor a horse, a mule laden with dates, a shield, and two spears to show his support, along with a message saying, "I have set up my camp, O my master, with the intention of stopping these people. If they are your enemies, I will not let them pass, and will seize them." Ba'eda Maryam sent his men against the Dobe'as again, but his campaign was defeated and suffered heavy casualties. Ba'eda Maryam was by this point infuriated, criticizing his soldiers for attacking without orders and stating his determination to remain in the Dobe'a country until he had subdued the country to the point where he could sow grain there and his horses could eats its crop. He then dispatched Jan Zeg, the Garad (governor) of Bale, in a campaign in the region of Gam, where the Garad was killed. Cholera (or some other pestilence) broke out among his men, depressing him further, resulting in his withdrawal to Tigray. There he called upon one of his best fighting regiments, Jan Amora ("Royal Eagle") after which the sub-province and woreda were named, who were eager to participate in the campaign. The twelve Dobe'a leaders learned of the new attack being prepared, and began to flee in various directions into the lowlands of Adal with their women, children, and cattle, with their property loaded on their camels and other beasts of burden. The Emperor heard of their plans, however, and mounted another campaign against Dobe'as, sending the governors of Tigray, Qeda and Damot to pursue them. This new campaign was successful, resulting in the capture of many cattle and the deaths of many Dobe'a, both in the main attack and the following pursuit.

After this defeat, many of the Dobe'a converted to Christianity and begged the Emperor for his pardon. The Emperor in turn returned their cattle, supplementing it with others from the southern provinces of Wej and Genz and stationed soldiers in their country. He further built a church in Dobe'a country dedicated to the Virgin Mary and planted orange trees, lemon trees, and vines in the area, in fulfillment of his earlier declaration. Ba'eda Maryam soon returned to the Dobe'a country and appointed governors and "regulated the social condition of the people," as well as encouraging the celebration of the death of the Virgin Mary every January, upon which occasion he distributed bread, tella (beer), and tej (a type of honey wine/mead) to the people. He further ordered that the Dobe'as become cultivators, as opposed to bandits and left the country for the last time.

Approximately half a century later, a report from Álvares noted that the Dobe'a country was suffering from a drought, and had therefore lost a lot of their cattle and were unable to sow any grain. There was also a complaint by the merchants of Manadeley at this time of excessive taxation, claiming that they were forced to pay 1000 ounces (waqet) of gold annually as interest of a loan of only 1000 ounces of gold from Emperor Lebna Dengel (r. 1508-1540).
