= Atronsa Maryam =

Church in South Wollo, Amhara Region, Ethiopia

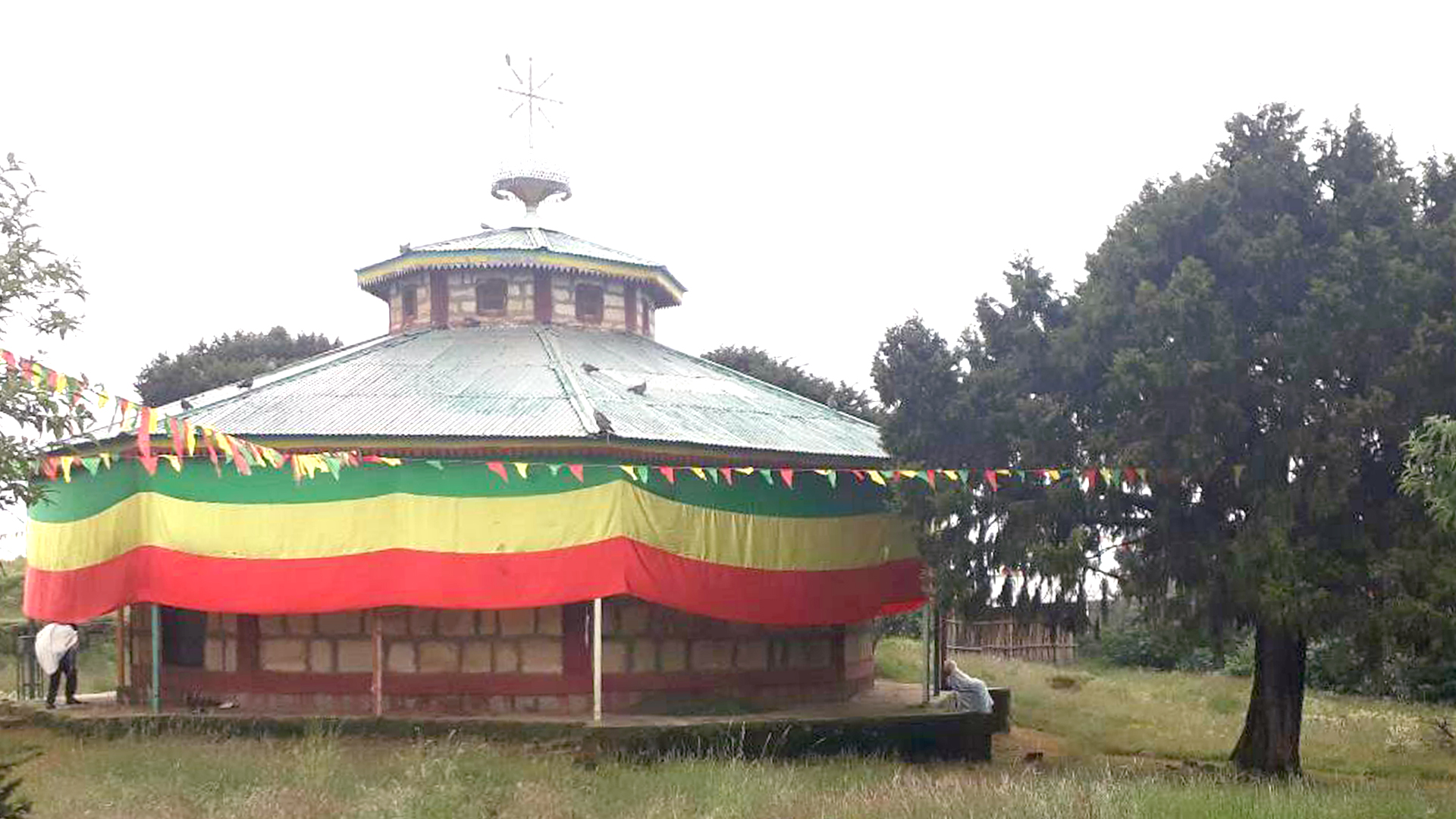
- Main church building

- Location within Ethiopia

Religion
- Affiliation: Ethiopian Orthodox Tewahedo Church
- Year consecrated: October 1468
- Status: Active

Location
- Location: Legahida, South Wollo, Amhara Region, Ethiopia
- Interactive map of Atronsa Maryam
- Coordinates: 10.756266°N 39.275634°E

Architecture
- Style: Medieval Ethiopian architecture
- Founder: Baeda Maryam I

Atronsa Maryam (Ge'ez: አትሮንሰ ማርያም, "Throne of St Mary") is one of the oldest churches in South Wollo, Amhara Region, Ethiopia. The church sits on small hill near the mighty river of Walaqa and about 5 km from the town of Woin Amba. The original name of this area was Kelanto. It is also very close to the famous church of Mekane Selassie. The church was first built by Emperor Baeda Maryam in about 1468, where he would also reinter Yekuno Amlak's body.

== Construction ==
Originally, the idea of building a church in the vicinity of Kelanto was initiated by Emperor Newaya Krestos, also called Sayfa Ara'ad (1344-1372). The place where this church was built is a private property of Emperor Newaya Krestos who bought it with his own money to build a church on it. Unfortunately, he died before he build one. The original name of the place was Kelanto; also called Sako Malza, apparently a name of the district where Kelanot was.

Several years later, fulfilling the ambition of his grand father, Emperor Zera Yacob (1434-1468) sent a tabot to the site and built a small chapel for her. He called its name Dabra Paraqlitos. Like his predecessors, Zera Yacob was not able to complete the work of building a church, and he died before he materialized his thought. Following the original name of the place, Kelanto, the church was also known by the locals as Dabra Kelanto. It is believed that Zera Yacob was not responsible for the creation of the tabot itself or for choosing the site for it. The local legend claims that the Tabot of Atronsa Maryam was brought during the reign of Ezana.

In about 1462, the son of Emperor Zera Yacob, Emperor Baeda Maryam (1468-1478) started building the church. He hastened its construction staying there and succeeded building a beautiful church. In October 1468, a few days after the commemoration (tizkar) of the fortieth day of the death of Emperor Zera Yacob, the church of Atronasa Maryam was inaugurated. During the inauguration, Emperor Baeda Maryam renamed the tabot and the site, where he built the church for it, Atronasa Maryam. The church was under the jurisdiction of the monastery of Debre Libanos. The son and successor of Emperor Baeda Maryam, Emperor Eskender (1474-1497), was apparently involved in the construction of the church. Eskandar, like Emperor Baeda Maryam, was buried in the church of Atronasa Maryam. Before the demolition of Atronsa Maryam, a total of about 21 kings of Abyssinia have been buried in this church.

In the course of time, the church acquired fame for its wealth - Emperor Baeda Maryam himself being its generous donor - and for harboring the remains of eighteen of the earlier metropolitans and emperors, starting with Yekuno Amlak (1270-1285). A text in the chronicle of Emperor Baeda Maryam states that the tabot spent 67 years in "Sako Melza". The period until the infamous 21st year of the reign of Emperor Lebna Dengel (1508-1540).

== Destruction ==
In about 1531, during the Ethiopian–Adal War between the Muslims and the Christian Ethiopian Empire, one of the Adal contingents, commanded by Waz Ir Nur, plundered its property and burned the church along with the treasure that they could not carry away. When they arrived at the church of Atronsa Maryam, they entered it and were astounded by its workmanship. However, the tabot itself, assumed to have been burned down with the church, was moved before the onslaught. This story was fully described by the writer of the Futuh al-Habasha as follows:

The Imam then called the Arabs who were with him, and said to them, "Is there in Constantinople (Rum) or India or anywhere else a building such as this house (Atronasa Maryam) and its paintings and gold?" They said, "We have neither seen nor heard about one like it in Constantinople or India or in the world."

Later, the tabot was able to come back to her original site after "57 years" of exile. The tabot is believed to have spent most of its exile in a new church built at a mountain pinnacle over the Blue Nile Gorge, also named after it as Atronsa Maryam. In about 1616, Hafa Krastos was able to rebuild the church which took him about 30 years. Hafa Krastos was the "son of Hamalmal" and probably the older brother of Emperor Susenyos I (1607-1632). The tabot spent about 94 years in happiness in the new church rebuilt by Hafa Krastos. In a second raid, the new church was again looted and demolished by the Oromo on 23 August 1710. This time the tabot herself was taken captive.

== See also ==
- Tadbaba Maryam
- Church of Our Lady Mary of Zion
