= Eleni of Ethiopia =

Empress of Ethiopia in the 15th century

Eleni
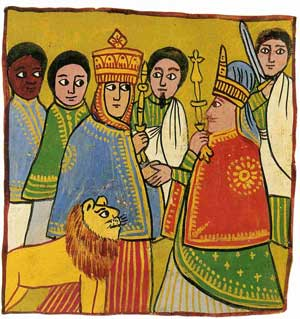
- Eleni of Hadiya, empress consort and later queen mother of Ethiopia

Empress of Ethiopia
- Reign: ? – 1468

Queen Mother
- Reign: 1468 – 1478
- Predecessor: Igzi Kebra
- Successor: Romna

Regent
- Reign: 1507–1516
- Born: Hadiya, Ethiopian Empire
- Died: April 1522; Ethiopian Empire
- Spouse: Zara Yaqob
- Dynasty: House of Solomon _{(by marriage)}
- Religion: Ethiopian Orthodox; Muslim (previously)

Eleni (Ge’ez: እሌኒ, "Helena"; died April 1522) also known as Queen of Zeila was Empress of Ethiopia by marriage to Zara Yaqob (r. 1434–1468), and served as regent between 1507 and 1516 during the minority of emperor Dawit II. She played a significant role in the government of Ethiopia during her lifetime, acting as de facto co-regent or advisor to a number of emperors; one testimony of this is the manuscript Bruce 88, which states that she had been in the palace of three illustrious Emperors: Zara Yaqob; his son by another wife, Baeda Maryam I (r. 1468–1478), and Na'od (r. 1494–1505).

== Life ==
The daughter of the King of Hadiya, Eleni was offered in marriage to the Abyssinian Emperor Zara Yaqob by the Hadiyan leader as part of a peace accord. The Adalite writer Arab Faqih later revealed in the sixteenth century that Hadiyah Muslims faced coercion from Abyssinian rulers, who demanded they surrender their daughters to the Christian state under threat of persecution. According to British historian Richard Pankhurst's historical analysis, tension between Adal and Abyssinia had begun to fester following the Abyssinian emperors' matrimonial union with Hadiya Princess Eleni which constituted an adversarial measure designed to undermine the strategic alliance between Adal and Hadiya. Hadiya rulers later appealed to the Adal Sultanate for assistance, which lead to the climax of conflict in the region during the Ethiopian-Adal war. Although the Portuguese historian Baltasar Teles wrote that Eleni had no children, in some manuscripts of Francisco Álvares's The Prester John of the Indies, a male relative of Lebna Dengel who escaped from Amba Geshen is described as her son, according to the translator but not the original text

=== Political influence ===
After Zara Yaqob's death, the next emperor, Baeda Maryam I, gave Eleni the title of Queen Mother, as his own mother Tsion Mogasa had been beaten to death during his father's reign. Eleni proved to be an effective member of the royal family; Paul B. Henze comments that she "was practically co-monarch" during his reign. When Eskender succeeded his father, Empress Eleni was initially pushed out of power by the Bitwoded Amda Mikael. However, around 1486 she participated in a palace coup that led to his deposition and execution, and Eleni thereafter played a leading role in government, which continued into the reign of Emperor Na'od.

From her childhood, Eleni retained awareness of the wider Muslim world and sought to reach a reconciliation with the neighbouring Muslim Empire of Adal, promoting commercial relations.

The Portuguese missionary Francisco Álvares was told by the Abuna Marqos, that upon Emperor Na'od's death in combat, "he and Queen Eleni made him [Lebna Dengel] King, because they had all of the great men in their hands." This statement points to the power Eleni wielded.

=== Regency ===
Understanding the growing threat that Ethiopia faced from the expanding Ottoman influence in the region, with the counsel of Pero da Covilhã, sent Mateus (also known as Matthew the Armenian) as an ambassador to the King of Portugal and the Pope in Rome. Apparently, the Portuguese only came to understand the nature of Matheus's mission after they arrived in Ethiopia, which complicated D. Rodrigo da Lima's mission to the Ethiopian Emperor. Eleni served as chief regent for the under-age Lebna Dengel, along with his mother, the Dowager Empress Na'od Mogassa, and Ras Degelhan of Gojjam, the Emperor's senior male relative.

Álvares also notes that Eleni possessed extensive estates in the province of Gojjam. Others said that "she was accomplished in everything: in front of God by practising righteousness and having strong faith, by praying and receiving Holy Communion; in worldly terms, she was accomplished in preparing food [for the royal table], in familiarity with the books, in knowledge of the law, and in understanding the affairs of state. For these qualities, the King greatly loved our Queen Eléni. He considered her like his own mother’.

=== Death ===
The date of Eleni's death is not entirely certain. However, Henze states that she died at an advanced age in the 1520s, and Beckingham and Huntingford confirms this by arguing that the evidence in Álvares account provides enough information to date her death to April, 1522. Álvares makes it clear that she died while he was in Ethiopia, adding that her death was a cause for sorrow by her subjects:

There was a great rumour and talk at the Court about the death of Queen Eleni. They said that since she had died all of them had died great and small, and that while she lived, all lived and were defended and protected; and she was the father and mother of all.

— Francesco Álvares, The Prester John of the Indies (1520–26; published 1540), p.434
