= Baeda Maryam I =

Emperor of Ethiopia from 1468 to 1478

Baeda Maryam I ቀዳማዊ ዐፄ በእደ ማርያም

Emperor of Ethiopia
- Reign: 26 August 1468 – 8 November 1478
- Predecessor: Zara Yaqob
- Successor: Eskender
- Born: 1448; Debre Berhan, Ethiopian Empire
- Died: 8 November 1478 (aged 29–30); Abasi Wera Gabayi, Ethiopian Empire
- Wives: Romna Wark; Eresh-Gazet; Kalyupe
- Issue: Eskender 'Enkua 'Esra'el; Theodore; Na'od
- Dynasty: House of Solomon
- Father: Zara Yaqob
- Mother: Seyon Mogess
- Religion: Ethiopian Orthodox Christianity

Baeda Maryam I (Ge'ez: በእደ ማርያም; Bäˀəda Maryam, meaning "He who is in the hand of Mary"; 1448 – 8 November 1478), otherwise known as Cyriacus was Emperor of Ethiopia from 1468 to 1478, and a member of the Solomonic dynasty. His reign was characterized by a number of military campaigns, most notably against the Dobe'a who lived along the western escarpment of the Ethiopian Highlands.

== Early years ==
Born at Debre Berhan, he was the son of Zara Yaqob by Seyon Mogesa.

Towards the end of Zara Yaqob's life, the Emperor became increasingly convinced that members of his family were plotting against him, and had several of them beaten. Baeda Maryam I's mother died from this mistreatment in 1462, and Baeda Maryam I buried her in secret in the church of Maqdesa Maryam, near Debre Berhan, and donated incense and other gifts to support the church. Zara Yaqob then directed his anger at Baeda Maryam I, until members of the Ethiopian Orthodox Church repaired the rift between the two, and Zara Yaqob publicly designated Baeda Maryam I as his successor.

== Reign ==
With his own mother dead, Baeda Maryam I gave Eleni, a wife of his father, the title of Queen Mother. She proved to be an effective member of the royal family, and Paul B. Henze comments that she "was practically co-monarch" during his reign. However, Edward Ullendorff notes Baeda Maryam I was unable to hold together the far-flung empire his father left him: "some of the outlying provinces recently conquered began to grow restive; the feudal lords whom Zar'a Ya'qob had only ephemerally brought under central control reasserted their regional authority; and the senior clergy relapsed into some of the old-established ways of conduct and ecclesiastical organization."

Emperor Baeda Maryam I conducted a campaign against the Dobe'a early in his reign, but they had fled with their cattle, camels, and he was unable to track down any of them. He subsequently rode into the area himself, but the Dobe'a recognized him from a distance and were able to flee, their possessions already having been evacuated. At this point, the "Dankalé," the ruler of the Danakil (better known as the Afar), offered to intervene and help in the Emperor's campaign. He sent the Emperor a horse, a mule laden with dates, a shield, and two spears to show his support, along with a message saying, "I have set up my camp, O my master, with the intention of stopping these people. If they are your enemies, I will not let them pass, and will seize them." Ba'eda Maryam sent his men against the Dobe'a again, but his men were defeated and suffered heavy casualties. Ba'eda Maryam was by this point infuriated, criticizing his soldiers for attacking without orders and stating his determination to remain in the Dobe'a country until he had subdued the country to the point where he could sow grain there and his horses could eat its crop.

The Emperor then dispatched Jan Zeg, the Garad (governor) of Bale, in a campaign in the region of Gam, where the Garad was killed. Cholera (or some other pestilence) broke out among his men, depressing him further, resulting in his withdrawal to Tigray. There he called upon one of his best fighting regiments, Jan Amora ("Royal Eagle"), after which the sub-province and woreda were named, who were eager to participate in the campaign. The twelve Dobe'a leaders learned of the new attack being prepared, and began to flee in various directions into the lowlands of Adal with their women, children, and cattle, with their property loaded on their camels and other beasts of burden. The Emperor heard of their plans, however, and mounted another campaign against Dobe'as, sending the governors of Tigray, Qeda and Damot to pursue them. This new campaign was successful, resulting in the capture of many cattle and the deaths of many Dobe'a, both in the main attack and the following pursuit.

After this defeat, many of the Dobe'a converted to Christianity and begged the Emperor for his pardon. The Emperor in turn returned their cattle, supplementing it with others from the southern provinces of Wej, and Genz and stationed soldiers in their country. He further built a church in Dobe'a country dedicated to the Virgin Mary and planted orange trees, lemon trees, and vines in the area, in fulfillment of his earlier declaration. Ba'eda Maryam soon returned to the Dobe'a country and appointed governors and "regulated the social condition of the people," as well as encouraging the celebration of the death of the Virgin Mary every January, upon which occasion he distributed bread, tela (beer), and tej (a type of honey wine or mead) to the people. He further ordered that the Dobe'a become cultivators, as opposed to bandits and left the country for the last time.

Baeda Maryam I moved his court to the Gurage country, using it as a base for campaigns in Dawaro and Bale. His constant campaigning led to a peace treaty with Sultan Muhammad of Adal, the son of Badlay ibn Sa'ad ad-Din, and used the peace it brought to his southern borders to successfully campaign against the restive Falasha in his northern territories. But on Muhammad's death, war with Adal flared up once again.

== Death ==
Baeda Maryam I died at Abasi Wera Gabayi of a sudden illness, but he was buried in a tomb at Atronsa Maryam, a church he had built in the area between the Abay and Jamma rivers. This church was later notable for its painting of Mary and Christ by the artist Brancaleon, a Venetian who had come to live in Ethiopia. His tomb was later destroyed in an Oromo raid in 1709, when they sacked the church, enslaved or killed all of the people present, and hurled the coffin of Baeda Maryam I over the nearby cliffs. The explorer Richard Burton records the contrary story that on his deathbed, Baeda Maryam I ordered that his body be buried so his face looked towards Adal, "upon whose subjugation the energies of ten years had been vainly expended."

Regnal titles
Preceded by Zara Yaqob	Emperor of Ethiopia; 1468–1478	Succeeded by Eskender
