= Amda Seyon II =

Emperor of Ethiopia in 1494

Amda Seyon II ዳግማዊ ዐፄ ዐምደ ጽዮን

Emperor of Ethiopia
- Reign: 7 May 1494 – 26 October 1494
- Predecessor: Eskender
- Successor: Na'od
- Dynasty: House of Solomon
- Father: Eskender

Amda Seyon II (Ge'ez: ዐምደ ጽዮን) was Emperor of Ethiopia briefly during 1494, and a member of the Solomonic dynasty.

Amda Seyon II was seven years old at the time of accession to the throne and reigned for only six or seven months. Many chroniclers omit any mention of this emperor.

Amda Seyon quickly became the pawn in the struggle for control of the throne, which ended in his death, and the ascension of Na'od. As Taddesse Tamrat writes, "Amda-Seyon's reign lasted for only six months, and even the hagiographer betrays a sense of great relief at the announcement of his death."

== Bibliography ==
- Budge, E. A. (1928). A History of Ethiopia: Nubia and Abyssinia (Volume I). London: Methuen & Co.
- Tamrat, Taddesse (1972). Church and State in Ethiopia. Oxford: Clarendon Press.

Regnal titles
Preceded by Eskender	Emperor of Ethiopia; 1494	Succeeded by Na'od
