= Epiphanius =

Epiphanius (/ˌɛpɪˈfeɪniəs/; "clearly manifested") may refer to:

== Given name ==
Ordered chronologically

- Epiphanius of Petra (fl. c. 335), Arab sophist at Athens
- Epiphanius of Salamis (c. 310–320 to 403), bishop of Salamis, Cyprus, and author of the Panarion
- Epiphanius of Pavia (438–496), saint and Bishop of Pavia
- Epiphanius Scholasticus (fl. c. 510), translator of Greek works into Latin
- Epiphanius of Constantinople (died 535), Greek Ecumenical Patriarch of Constantinople, 520–535
- Epiphanius (patriarch of Aquileia), first patriarch of Aquileia to rule from Grado, Italy, 612–613
- Epiphanius the Monk, 8th or 9th century priest in the Kallistratos monastery, Constantinople
- Epiphanius the Wise (died 1420), Russian monk, hagiographer, and disciple of Saint Sergius of Radonezh
- Epiphanius Evesham (fl. 1570–c. 1623), English sculptor
- Epiphanius Slavinetsky (died 1675), ecclesiastical expert of the Russian Orthodox Church
- Epiphanius Shanov (1849–1940), Bulgarian Uniate priest
- Epiphanius Artemis of Thera (born 1934), Greek Orthodox bishop
- Epiphanios of Vryoula (1935–2011), Eastern Orthodox archbishop of Spain and Portugal
- Epiphanios of Mylopotamos (1956–2020), Greek Orthodox monk and chef at Mount Athos
- Epiphanius of Kyiv (born 1979), elected primate of the Orthodox Church of Ukraine (since 15 December 2018) and Metropolitan of Kyiv and All Ukraine

== Other uses ==
- Annius Eucharius Epiphanius, praefectus urbi (urban prefect) of the city of Rome (412–414)
- Anba Epiphanius (1954–2018), Egyptian Coptic Orthodox Church bishop who was murdered

== See also ==
- Pseudo-Epiphanius, an anonymous 8th-century Christian author of a selection of legends about the lives of the twelve apostles
- Monastery of Saint Epiphanius, founded by Epiphanius Scholasticus
- Epiphanes (disambiguation)
