= Joseph's granaries =

Designation for the Egyptian pyramids often used by early travelers

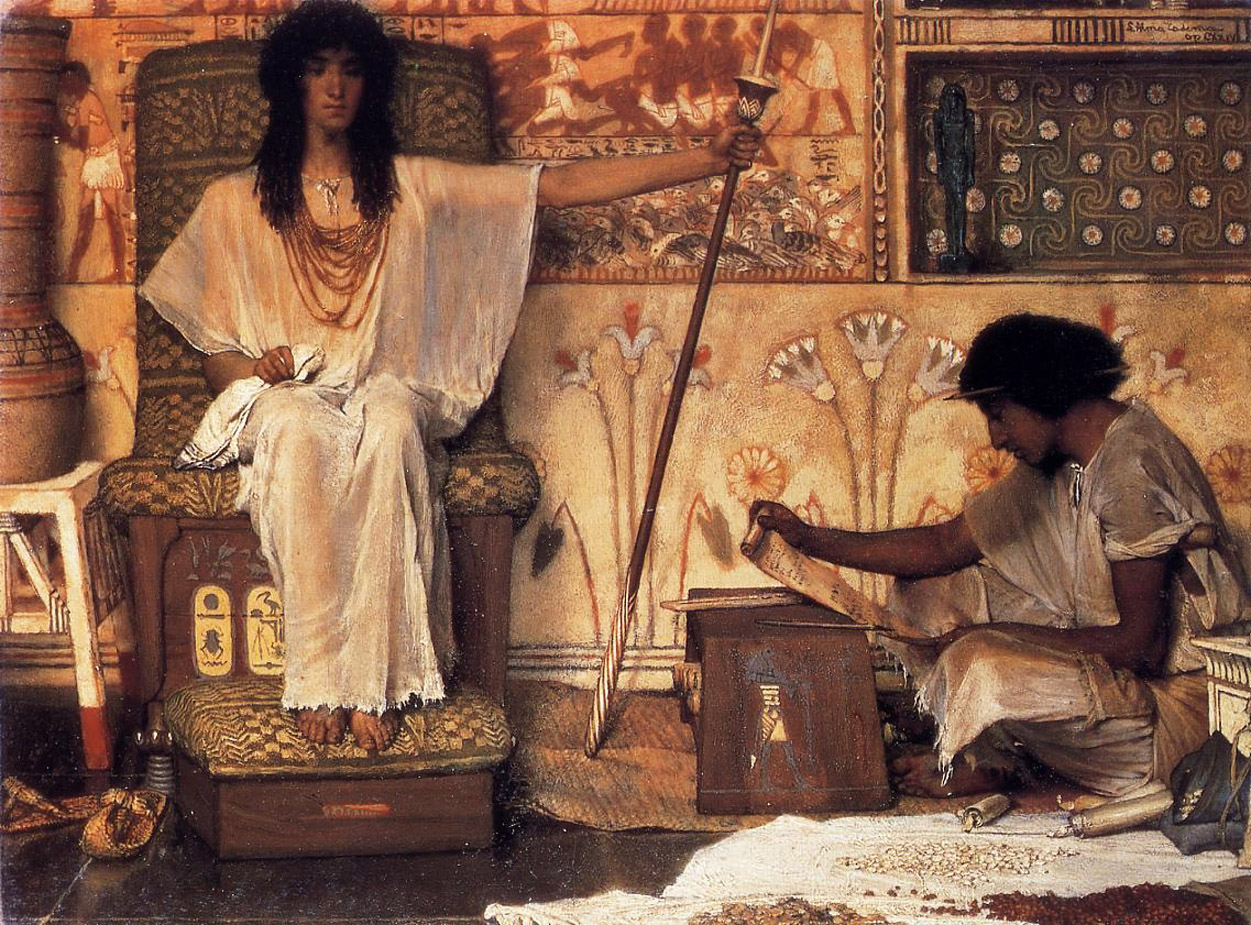
Joseph, Overseer of Pharaoh's Granaries by Lawrence Alma-Tadema (1874)

Joseph's granaries is a designation for the Egyptian pyramids often used by early travelers to the region. The notion of a granary (horreum, θησαυρός) being associated with the Hebrew patriarch Joseph derives from the account in Genesis 41, where "he gathered up all the food of the seven years when there was plenty in the land of Egypt, and stored up food in the cities ... And Joseph stored up grain in great abundance, like the sand of the sea, until he ceased to measure it, for it could not be measured" (vv. 48-9, RSV). "So when the famine had spread over all the land, Joseph opened all the storehouses (horrea Vulgate, σιτοβολῶνας LXX) and sold to the Egyptians" (v. 56). Similarly, in the Quran: "(Joseph) said: 'Give me charge of the granaries (خَزَائِنِ) of the land. I shall husband them wisely'" (12:55). The designation was used throughout the Middle Ages and only really abated in the Renaissance, when travel to the region became easier and closer investigation revealed the implausibility of the structures serving as storehouses for foodstuffs.

== Classical antiquity ==
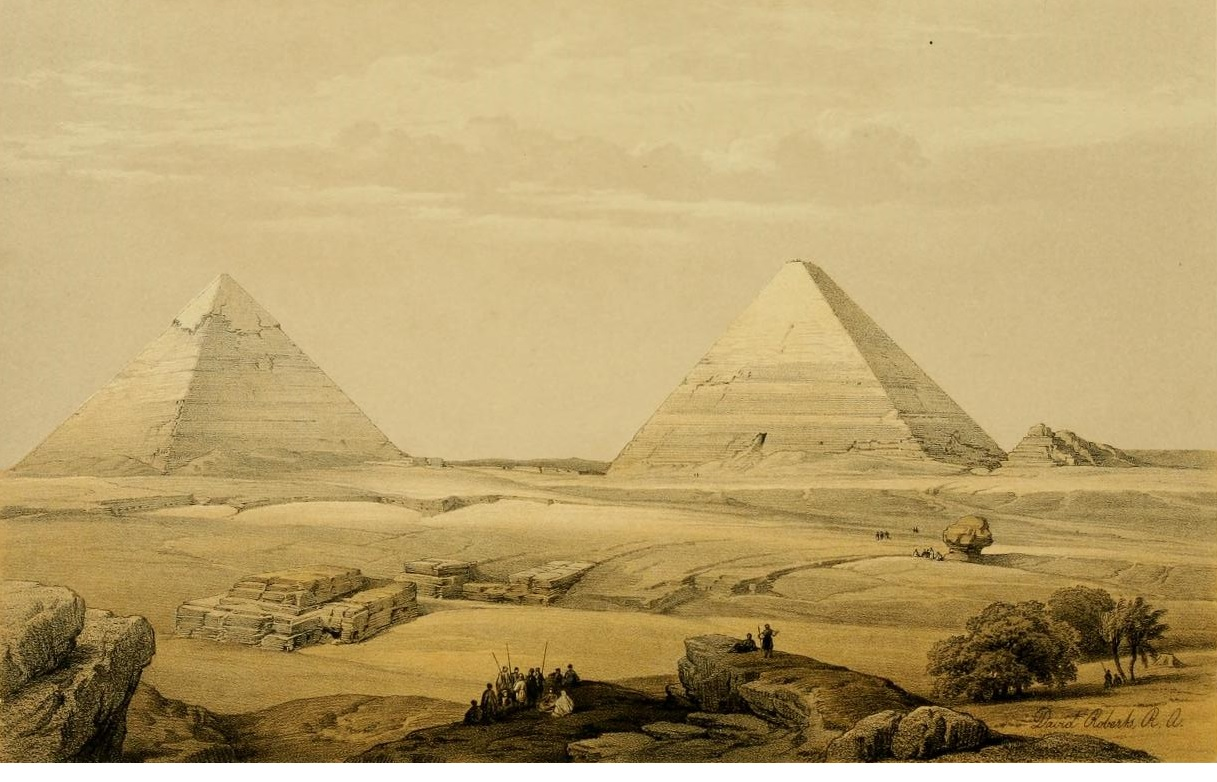
Pyramids at Giza as rendered by David Roberts (1846)

The great antiquity of the Pyramids caused their true nature to become increasingly obscured. As the Egyptian scholar Abu Ja'far al-Idrisi (died 1251), the author of the oldest known extensive study of the Pyramids, puts it: "The nation that built it lay destroyed, it has no successor to carry the truth of its stories from father to son, as sons of other nations carry from their fathers what they love and cherish among their stories." As a result, the oldest discussion of the Pyramids that has survived is from the Greek historian Herodotus, who visited them soon after 450 BC. He describes "the underground chambers on the hill whereon the pyramids stand", which "the king meant to be burial places for himself". Several later classical authors, such as Diodorus Siculus, who visited Egypt c. 60 BC, also recorded that the "kings built the pyramids to serve as their tombs"; and similarly Strabo, who made his visit in 25 BC, explicitly noted that they were "the tombs of kings"; yet in 77 AD the well-read natural historian Pliny the Elder simply says they were "a superfluous and foolish display of wealth", built by the kings so as "to avoid providing funds for their successors or for rivals who wished to plot against them, or else to keep the common folk occupied."

== Early Middle Ages ==
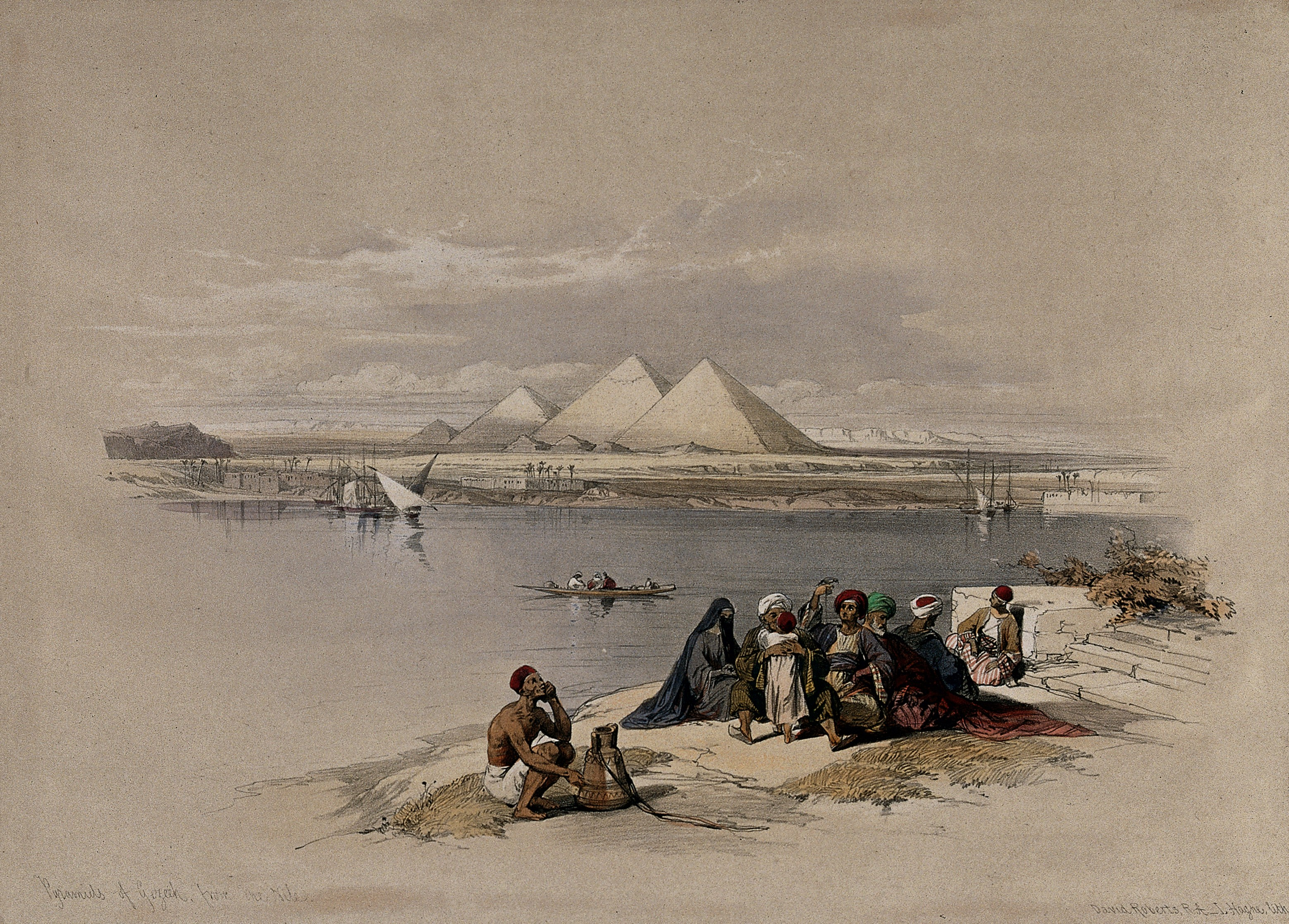
View across the Nile by David Roberts (1846)

Early Christian commentators on Genesis never make the association of Joseph's granaries with the Pyramids in Egypt; nor do Jewish commentators. Jean-Antoine Letronne (1787-1848), the successor to Jean-François Champollion at the Collège de France, thought the ultimate source was the Jewish community at Alexandria: "As for the idea that Joseph was the author of these granaries, it is due, I think, to the Alexandrian Jews, who showed themselves always very jealous of linking the history of Egypt to theirs, and to have the Hebrews play a role in this country." However, the first actual evidence of the use of the phrase is found in the early travel narratives of pilgrims to the Holy Land. The female Christian traveler Egeria records that on her visit between 381 and 384 AD, "in the twelve-mile stretch between Memphis and Babylonia [= Old Cairo] are many pyramids, which Joseph made in order to store corn." Ten years later the usage is confirmed in the anonymous travelogue of seven monks that set out from Jerusalem to visit the famous ascetics in Egypt, wherein they report that they "saw Joseph's granaries, where he stored grain in biblical times." This late 4th-century usage is further confirmed in a geographical treatise of Julius Honorius, perhaps written as early as 376 AD, which explains that the Pyramids were called the "granaries of Joseph" (horrea Ioseph). This reference from Julius is important, for it indicates that the identification was starting to spread out from pilgrims' travelogues.

Beginning in the early 6th century, commentators on the orations of Gregory of Nazianzus record that it was known there were competing explanations for the purpose of the Pyramids. For example, Pseudo-Nonnus writes: "The Pyramids are themselves worthy of viewing, and were built in Egypt at great expense. The Christians say they are the granaries of Joseph, but the Greeks, among whom is Herodotus, that they are the tombs of certain kings." In the 8th century Bishop Cosmas of Jerusalem repeats this almost verbatim; and also, less closely, Nicetas of Heraclea in the later 11th century. In the late 6th century Gregory of Tours recorded the kind of reasoning that made the idea seem plausible to those who had never traveled to the sites themselves: in Babylonia "Joseph built wonderful granaries of squared stone and rubble. They are wide at the base and narrow at the top in order that the wheat might be cast into them through a tiny opening."

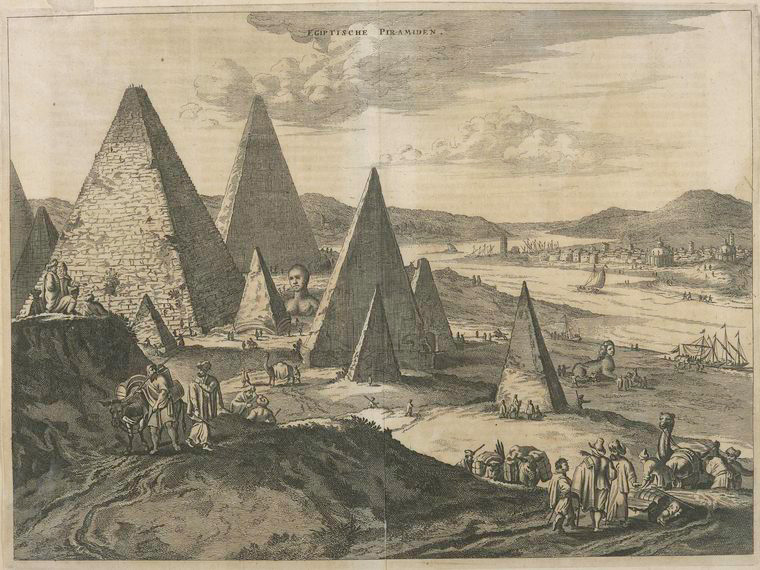
View of the Pyramids by Olfert Dapper (1670)

The term continued to be used by pilgrims: the Piacenza Pilgrim in c. 570, who notes "they are still full"; Epiphanius the Monk (using Ancient Greek: ἀποθῆκαι, romanized: apothēcae, lit. 'storehouses') in c. 750; and the Irish monk Dicuil in his report of the travels of a fellow monk named Fidelis in 762-65. Fidelis says that "after a long voyage on the Nile they saw in the distance the Granaries made by Saint Joseph. There were seven of them, to match the number of the years of plenty; they looked like mountains, four in one place and three in another." A hundred years later (870) the French monk Bernard the Wise records that his party "went aboard a Nile boat and after sailing for six days reached the city of Babylonia in Egypt. Pharaoh once reigned there, and during his reign Joseph built seven granaries which remain standing to this day."

An important expedition had visited the Pyramids several years earlier (832), led by the Abbasid caliph al-Ma'mūn, and had explored the interior of the Pyramid of Khufu, finding (breaking into) a new passageway. Accompanying him on this adventure was the Syrian archbishop of Antioch Dionysius of Tell Mahre, who left some important observations: "In Egypt we also beheld those edifices mentioned by the Theologian [Gregory of Nazianzus] in one of his discourses. They are not, as some believe, the granaries of Joseph. Rather, they are marvelous shrines built over the tombs of ancient kings, and in any event oblique and solid, not hollow and empty. They have no interior, and none has a door. We noticed a fissure in one of them and ascertained that it is approximately 50 cubits deep. Evidently the stones [in this place] had been solidly packed, before being broken by people who wanted to see whether the pyramids were solid." However, despite this solid refutation of the notion, "this knowledge fell on deaf ears." The great French orientalist Silvestre de Sacy (1758-1838) cited the account of Dionysius as proof that the belief "was common in the East in the 9th century." Over a hundred years later, the Arab traveler Ibn Hawqal (d. 988) wrote an influential book on geography, wherein he spoke of the Pyramids at Giza: "Some report that they are tombs; but this is false." Rather, the builders "had foreseen the flood and knew that this cataclysm would destroy everything on the surface of the earth, with the exception of what could be stored in the safety of such buildings; and they hid their treasures and their wealth therein; then came the flood. When the waters dried up, all that was in the two Pyramids passed to Bansar son of Mizraim, son of Ham, son of Noah. Some kings, centuries later, made them their granaries." Al-Muqaddasi (d. 991), a great contemporary geographer, confirms the identification: "Varying accounts have been given me about both structures [the two great pyramids], some saying that they are both talismans, others that they were the granaries of Joseph; others say no, rather, they are their burial grounds."

== Etymology ==
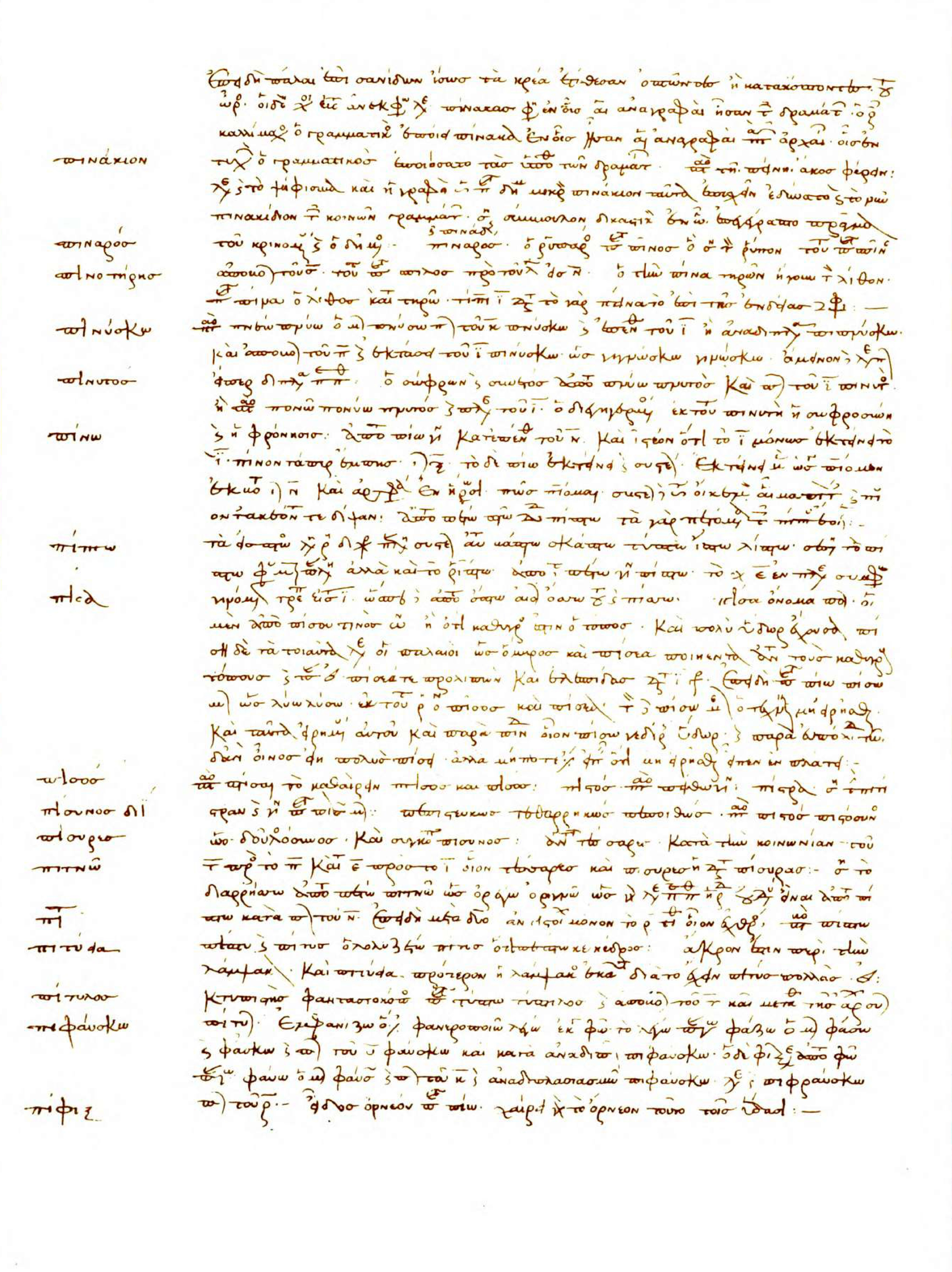
Etymologicum Magnum manuscript (c. 1300)

There were additional reasons that may have made the notion of the Pyramids being granaries seem plausible to people in the past. First, there was the murky issue of the etymology of the word pyramid (Ancient Greek: πυραμίς, romanized: pyramis, lit. 'pyramid'). Writing in c. 390, the Roman historian Ammianus Marcellinus explained that "the figure pyramid has that name among geometers because it narrows into a cone after the manner of fire, which in our language is called πῦρ." Later lexicographers would derive it alternately from the Greek word for cereal grain (Ancient Greek: πυρός, romanized: pyros, lit. 'wheat'). Stephen of Byzantium c. 550 wrote: "They were called 'pyramids' (πυραμἰδες) from the grain (πυρῶν), which the king collected there." This derivation was repeated in the mid-12th century by the compiler of the Etymologicum Magnum, the largest Byzantine lexicon, with the addition that these royal granaries (ὡρεῖα) "were constructed by Joseph"; and it was still repeated 400 years later by Johann Scapula in his Lexicon Graeco-Latinum (1580), which was still in print in the 19th century.

Modern Egyptologists for the most part have endorsed an etymological relationship to cereal grain, but in a different aspect. As I. E. S. Edwards explains: "In the absence of any more convincing explanation, it seems better to regard pyramis [πυραμίς] as a purely Greek word which had no etymological connection with the Egyptian language. An exactly similar word exists with the meaning 'wheaten cake', and the suggestion has been made that the early Greeks used this humorously as a name for the Egyptian monuments, possibly because, when seen from a distance, they resembled large cakes."

Another interesting etymological conundrum that may have some relevance here is the origin of the Arabic word for pyramid, haram (هرم). Years ago, when noting the identification of the Pyramids with granaries, Charles Clermont-Ganneau speculated: "It is not impossible that this strange legend had originated in a kind of pun on ahrâm (أهرام), pyramids, and ahrà (أهراء), barns/granaries," noting that it is a "word that does not appear to have Arabic ties and is perhaps simply the Latin horreum." More recent scholarship has suggested that it was derived from the South Arabic word haram meaning "a tall building."

== Joseph as Serapis ==
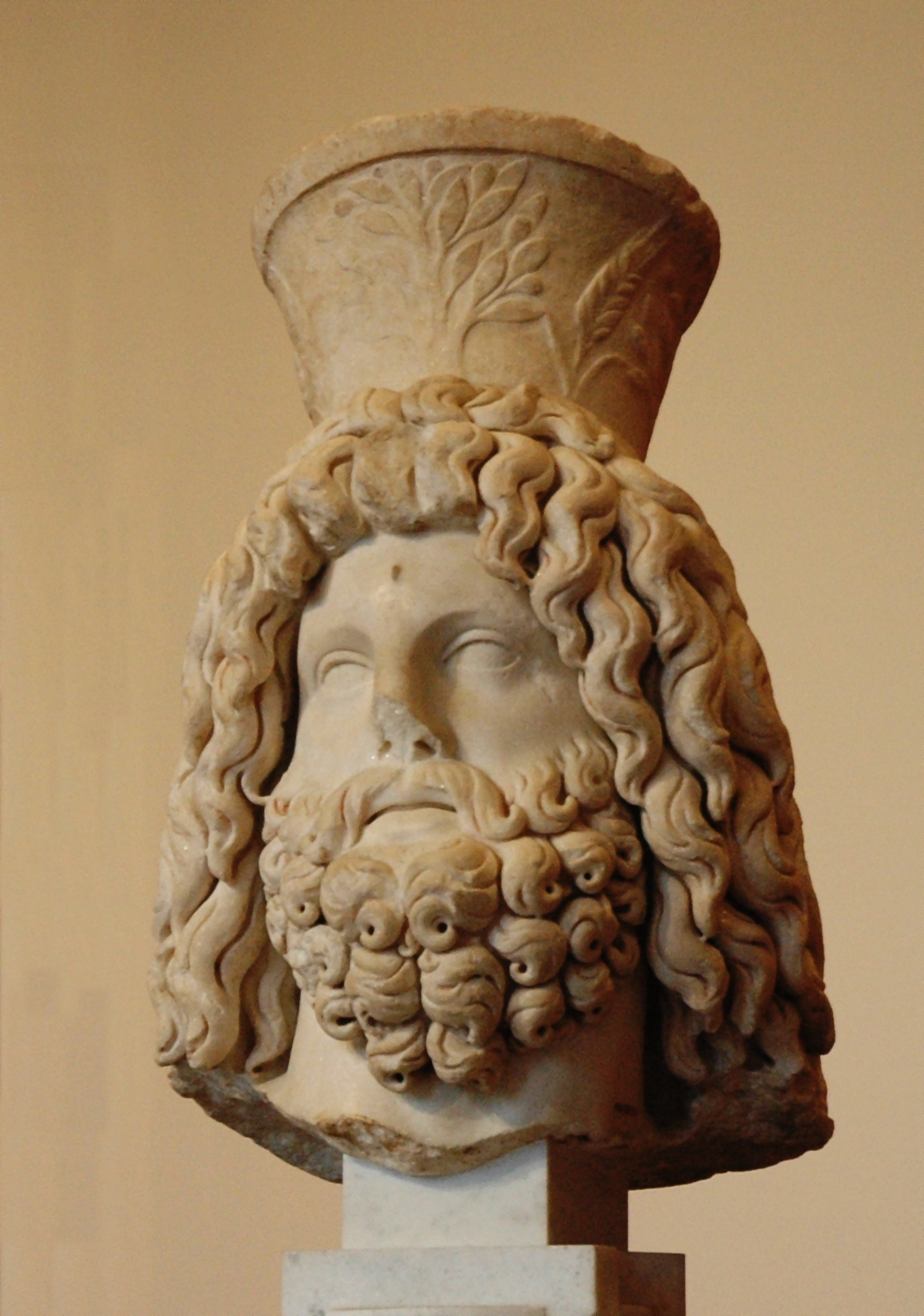
Marble bust of Serapis wearing a modius decorated with "ears of corn"

The second reason that the notion may have seemed plausible was that Joseph was often identified with the Egyptian God Serapis. The first account of this identification comes from the late 2nd century from either Melito of Sardis c. 170 AD, if his Apology is to be accepted as authentic, or from Tertullian in 197 AD. However, it is Tertullian that goes on for some length in explaining the identification: "They called him Serapis, from the turban which adorned his head. The peck-like shape of this turban marks the memory of his corn-provisioning; whilst evidence is given that the care of the supplies was all on his head, by the very ears of corn which embellish the border of the head-dress." The identification then persisted in Christian tradition with Firmicus Maternus c. 350, adding an etymological argument that "because he was the great-grandson of Sara, the nonagenarian by whom Abraham through God's favor had begotten a son, he was called in Greek Serapis, i.e. Σάρρας παῖς ["Sara's son"]"; next was Rufinus in 402; then just a few years later Paulinus of Nola puts into verse another more expansive explanation: "Thus he [Satan] fashioned holy Joseph into Serapis, hiding that revered name beneath a name of death; yet all the time the statue's shape revealed the faith, for a bushel overtops its head, the reason being that in ancient days corn was collected at the inspiration of the Lord before a famine, and with the grain from Egypt's fruitful breast Joseph fed countless peoples and filled up the lean years with years of plenty."

The identification was also known in the Jewish tradition, for the Babylonian talmud preserves a saying most likely also from the late 2nd century, this time relying on Semitic etymology: "Serapis [סר אפּיס] alludes to Joseph who became a prince [sar סר (= שַׂר)] and appeased [meiphis מפּיס] the whole world." G. Mussies thinks that the reason for the identification was "that Sarapis and Joseph were both, though each in his own way, suppliers of corn, Sarapis because he was practically identical with the Nile, the cause of the annual irrigation and thus fertility itself," and Joseph because of his overseeing the storage of corn during the years of plenty. He argues that it is clear "it was Jews who first propagated the identity of Joseph and Sarapis," rather than the Egyptians. At any rate, the identification persisted for hundreds of years, as is evidenced by its inclusion in the Suda in the late 10th century.

== High and Late Middle Ages ==
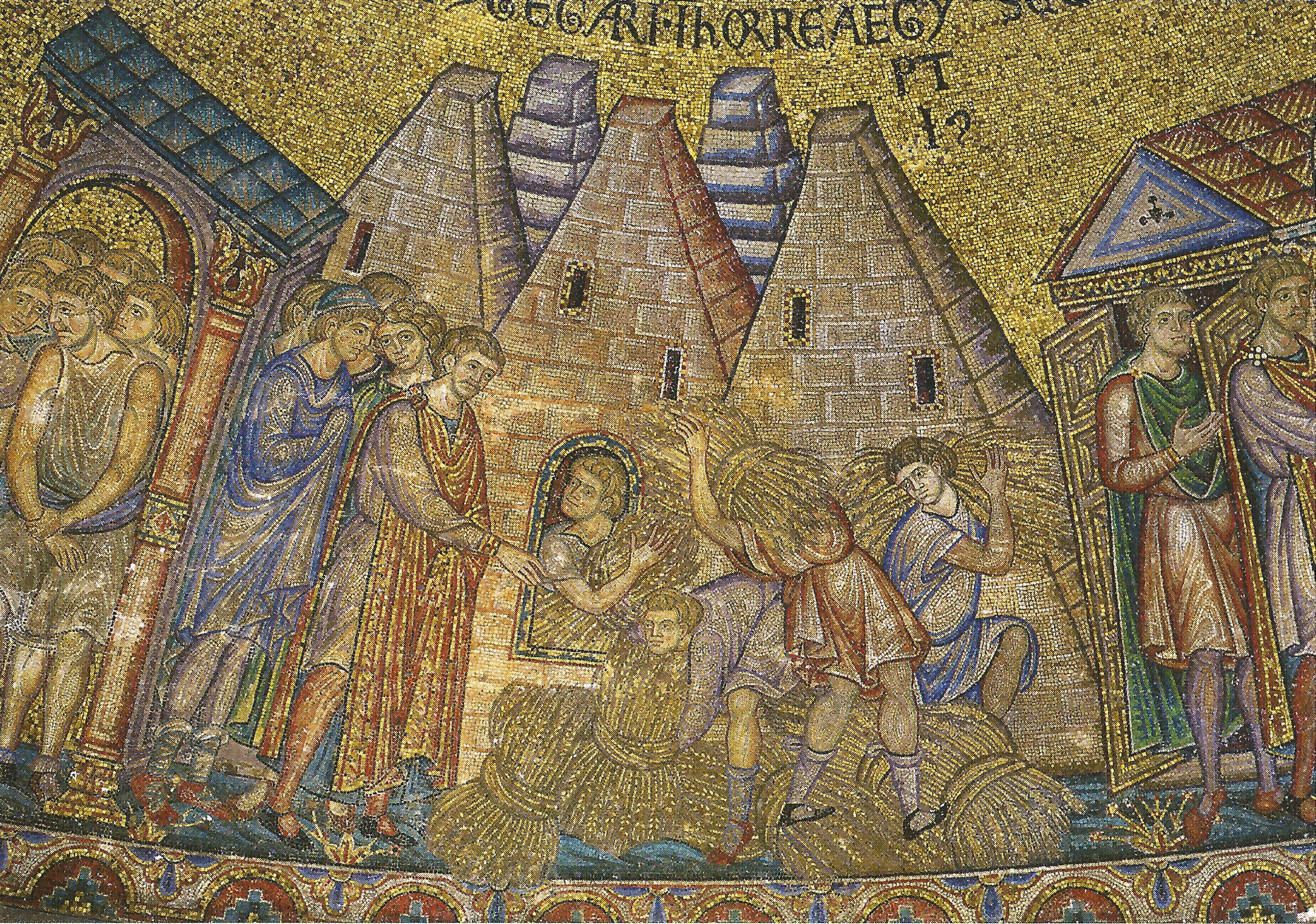
Joseph Gathering Corn (San Marco, c. 1275)

The period of the crusades brought a new wave of adventurers, some of whom would visit the sites in Egypt. The first we know of in this period was not a Christian, but rather the greatest Jewish traveler of the Middle Ages, Benjamin of Tudela. He recorded in his travel narrative of 1160-73 that "the storehouses of Joseph of blessed memory are to be found in great numbers in many places. They are built of lime and stone and are exceedingly strong." By and large, Arabic writers discussed other theories for the origin of the Pyramids, though the great world geographer Muhammad al-Idrisi (d. 1166) left an interesting comment concerning the Pyramids: "It is said that these monuments are the tombs of kings, and that before being used for this purpose, they were used as granaries." The German Dominican Burchard of Mount Sion traveled about the region in 1274-85, entering Egypt on 8 September 1284. He later produced a very popular account, which reported: "Five leagues from Babylon are lofty triangular pyramids, which are believed to have been Joseph's granaries." Some forty years later (1307–21) the Venetian Marino Sanudo Torsello wrote a book on crusading – Liber Secretorum Fidelium Crucis – and included Burchard's statement, though without attribution.

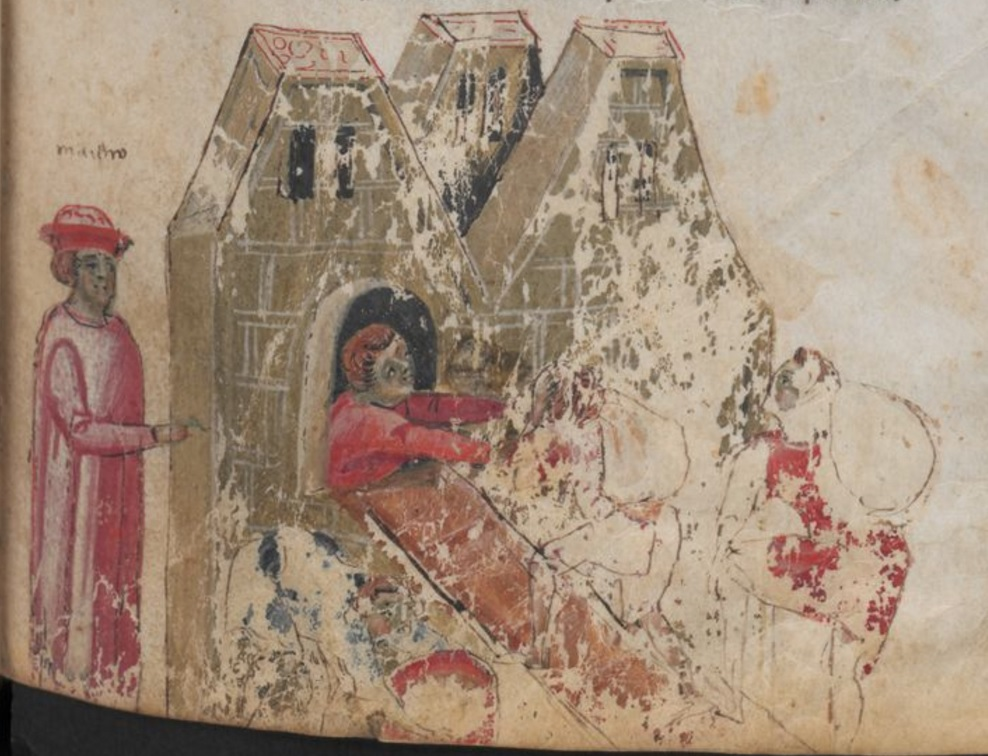
Joseph Gathering Corn (Histoire ancienne manuscript, c. 1375)

The fall of the Crusader Kingdom in 1291 and the ruin of Acre had a significant impact on navigation in the Mediterranean and the travel of Europeans to the Middle East. Italian merchants, especially the Venetians, established new outlets in Alexandria and as a result it became the starting point for travelers to the Holy Land. Around this time artists included the image of grain being stored in the Pyramids as part of the Joseph cycle that adorns the mosaics in the atrium of St Mark's Basilica (San Marco) in Venice. In the third Joseph cupola in the north narthex there are two scenes that show Joseph in front of five pyramids. In the one usually titled "Joseph Gathering Corn" we see Joseph standing at the left giving orders and one of the men involved in the task standing inside an opening in the pyramid collecting the sheaves. Most of the images in the Genesis mosaics at San Marco derive from the so-called Cotton Genesis, one of the earliest illustrated Christian manuscripts. "However there is one very basic difference," writes Weitzmann, "in Cotton Genesis the corn is deposited in granaries that have the shape of beehives, the traditional form of an Egyptian granary, whereas in San Marco the granaries are depicted in the shape of pyramids, of which three in front might suggest a knowledge of the pyramids of Gizeh." An identical image of the pyramids does appear in Cotton Genesis in a different scene, "Joseph Selling Corn," where "they are not meant to be granaries but form the background to indicate, topographically, that this scene takes place in Egypt." As to why the Venetian mosaicist has used the pyramids in both scenes, Dale thinks it "may suggest a fresh inspiration from the experience of Venetian merchants who regularly traveled to Egypt." There is also a late 14th-century copy of the Histoire ancienne jusqu'à César that contains similar imagery, and like the San Marco mosaics, "replaces the beehive granaries of Cotton Genesis with pyramidal buildings borrowed from the scene of Joseph Selling Corn."

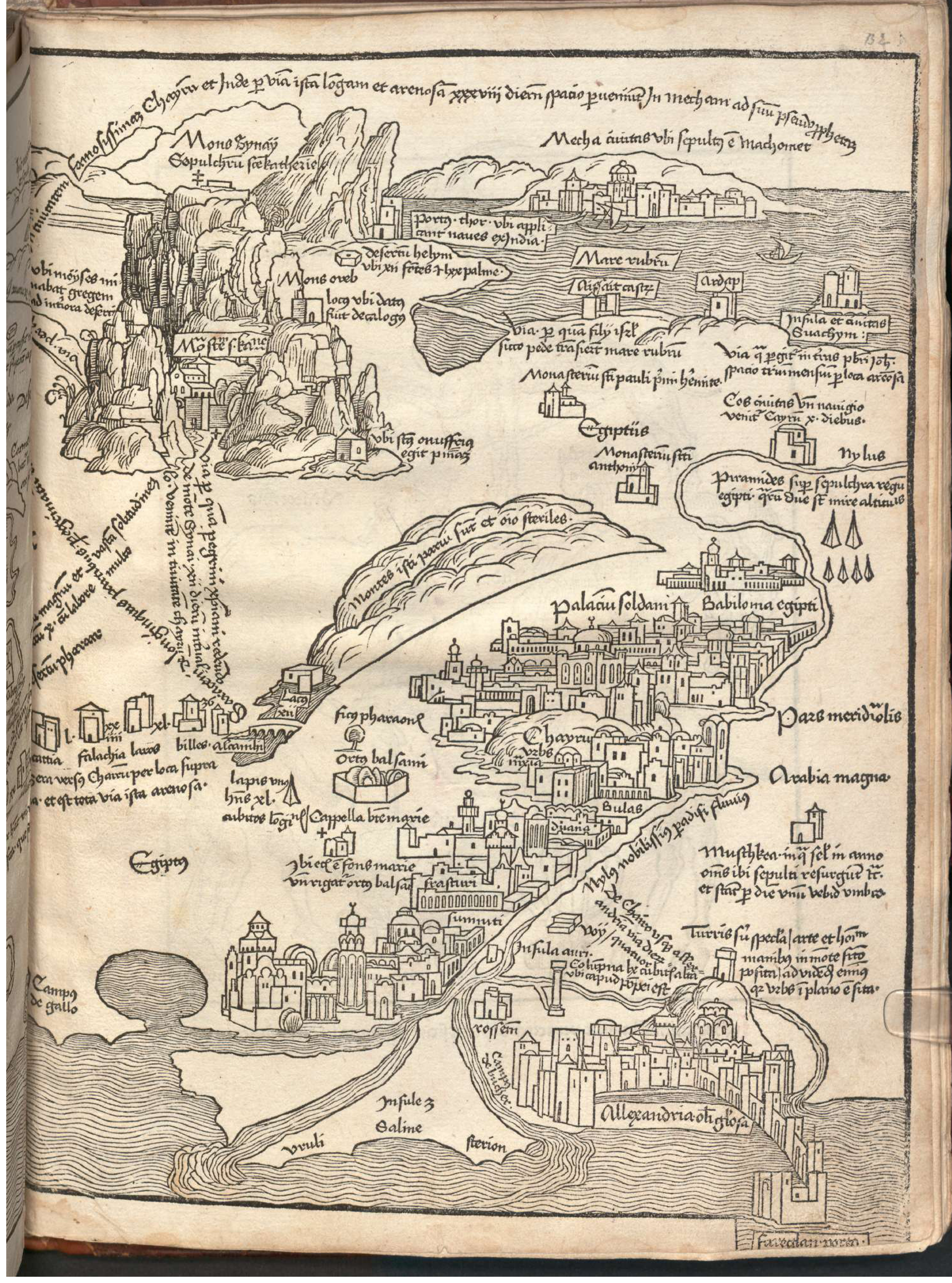
Map of the Nile from Breydenbach, Peregrinatio (1486). One pyramid can be seen at the middle to the left of the city, and six more pyramids are located to the right.

The 14th century saw a wave of travelers who left records of their travels. In 1323 the Anglo-Irish friar Simon Fitzsimon (Symon Semeonis) visited the area with his friend Hugh (who died in Cairo) and observed "the granaries (granaria) of Joseph mentioned in Genesis. They are three in number, of which two are of such size and height that at a distance they look more like the summits of mountains than repositories of corn." In 1349 the Tuscan monk Niccolò Poggibonsi noted that "three miles outside Babylon there are granaries, which are called Pharaoh's granaries. Joseph, the son of Jacob, had them built." He continues: "three are outside Babylon, which are so big that coming from Alexandria they can be seen 60 miles away. The said seven granaries are diamond shaped and within is a large house, above and below of porphyry; and within there is a deep pit. And many a time we threw in stones and did not hear them strike the bottom and it looked very dark, and we left at once through fear, having our little torch quenched from the wind, which came from there." The year 1374 saw thirteen Tuscan travelers make the pilgrimage to the Holy Land, three of which left accounts: Leonardo Frescobaldi, Simone Sigoli, and Giorgio Gucci. Frescobaldi makes a brief mention of "the granaries which Joseph had made at the time of Pharaoh king of Egypt, in the days of the famine." Sigoli offers a fuller and more literary account, noting that "Joseph found means to have from every side as much corn as he could, and quickly he collected a very great number of bushels, and this grain he put in these granaries. And they are among the biggest edifices to be seen: and they are three and distant one from another a stones throw; and they are built of very great long thick stones and in shape like a diamond; the base is very wide and the summit pointed ... and each has four sides, and the corn was placed inside: just imagine the very great amount amount that inside would take." Gucci appears to have reflected a bit more on what he saw: "These granaries, which are of giant structure, are said to have been made by Pharaoh at the time of the great famine at the time of Joseph, though to see them they appear to be works for perpetual memory rather than granaries. In 1392 Thomas Brygg, an Englishman who later became mayor of Bordeaux, noted the "famous granaries of wondrous size which Joseph, the son of Jacob, had built in the days of Pharaoh." In 1395 the French lord Ogier d'Anglure described the challenges of getting to the foot of the Pyramids and the commotion of workers stripping the smooth facing: "the great stones falling like so many vine plants that these masons were chopping down." "It should be explained," he continues, "that these granaries are called Pharaoh's Granaries; and the pharaoh had them built in the time when Joseph, the son of Jacob, was governor over all the kingdom of Egypt ... As for describing the inside of these granaries, we could hardly speak of it, since the entrance from above is walled up and there are enormous tombs in front of it ... [for] the entrances were closed up because people had been using the places to make counterfeit money."

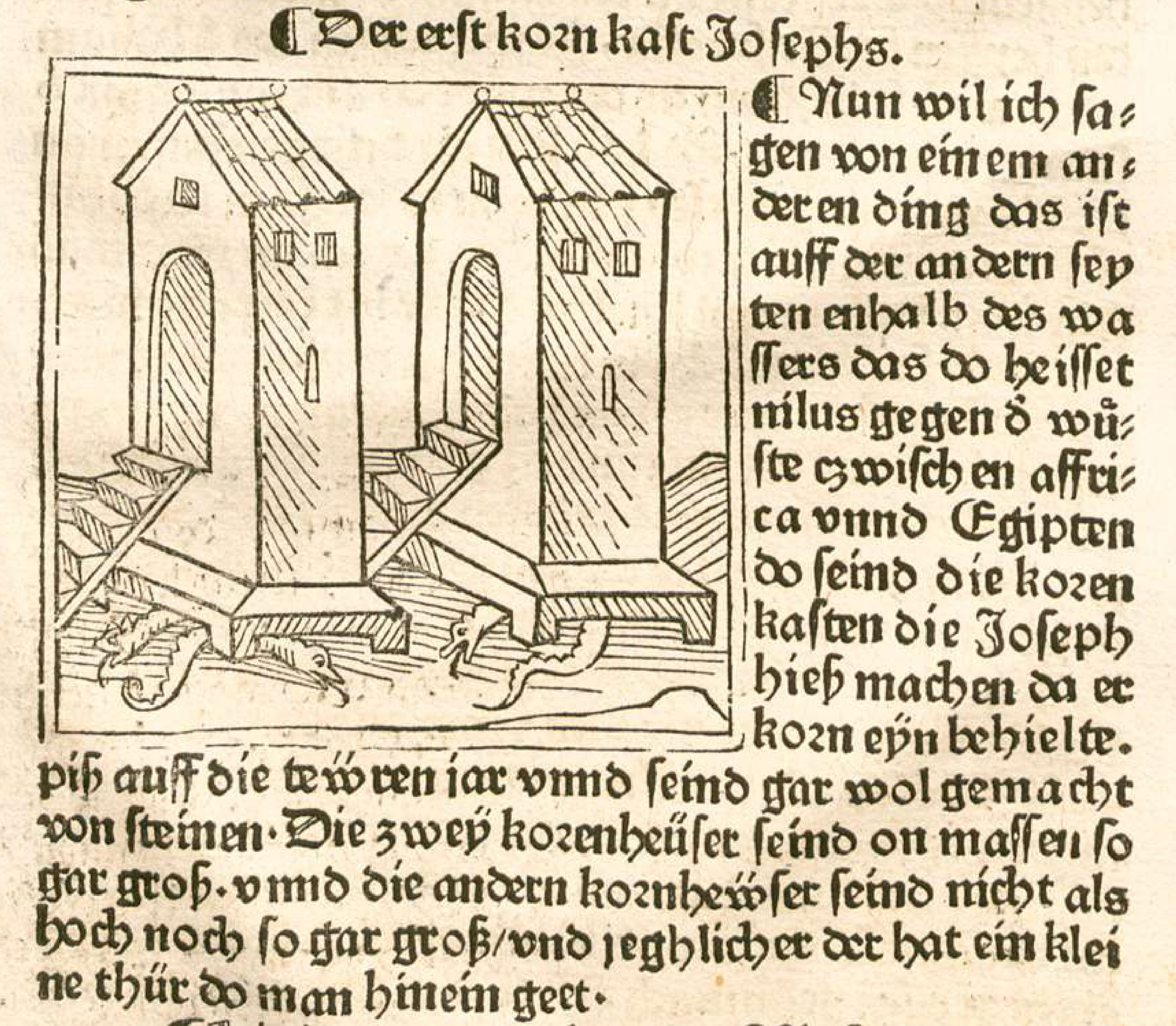
Joseph's granaries in the German version of Mandeville's Travels (1481)

In a rather different notice written in 1350, Ludolph of Sudheim, a parish priest from Westphalia, correctly refers to the Pyramids as sepulchers, and says "these tombs are called by the natives Pharaoh's granaries." Some twenty years earlier the German Dominican William of Boldensele had traveled about Egypt and left (1336) a very critical account of the notion: "the simple people of the country say that these were Pharaoh's barns and granaries in which Joseph had the wheat kept in the time of the great famine mentioned in the Bible ... But this cannot be true at all, for no place for putting in the wheat can be found there, and there is in inside these columns no empty space where anything can be placed. For from top to bottom they are closed and made entirely of huge stones well joined to one another—except that there is a very small door quite high above the ground and a very narrow and very dark little passage through which one descends there for a certain distance, but it is not all wide enough to put grain in, as those of the country say and believe." The German knight's memoir would provide the framework, and many of the details, for one of the most popular books of the late Middle Ages, the Travels of John Mandeville (1356). The supposed author most likely did not visit the locales in his narrative, and in the case of his account of the Pyramids, he actually reverses the conclusions and reasoning of William: "these are Joseph's Granaries, which he had made to store the wheat for hard times ... Some say that they are tombs of the great lords of antiquity, but that is not true, for the common word through the whole country near and far is that they are Joseph's Granaries, and they have it written thus in their chronicles. On the other hand, if they were tombs, they would not be empty inside, nor would they have entrances for going inside, nor are tombs ever made of such a large size and such a height—which is why it is not to be believed that they are tombs."

During the 15th century opinion was more evenly split as to the nature of the Pyramids. An anonymous traveler in 1420 speaks of going "to see the most marvelous fourteen granaries of Pharaoh, five or six miles distant from Cairo." He continues, "you must cross the river Nile that flows from the Earthly Paradise ... and from the top [of the granary] there is a good view of the very large city of Cairo. But there, around these granaries, there is such a great colony of rats that it sometimes seems as if they cover the entire ground."

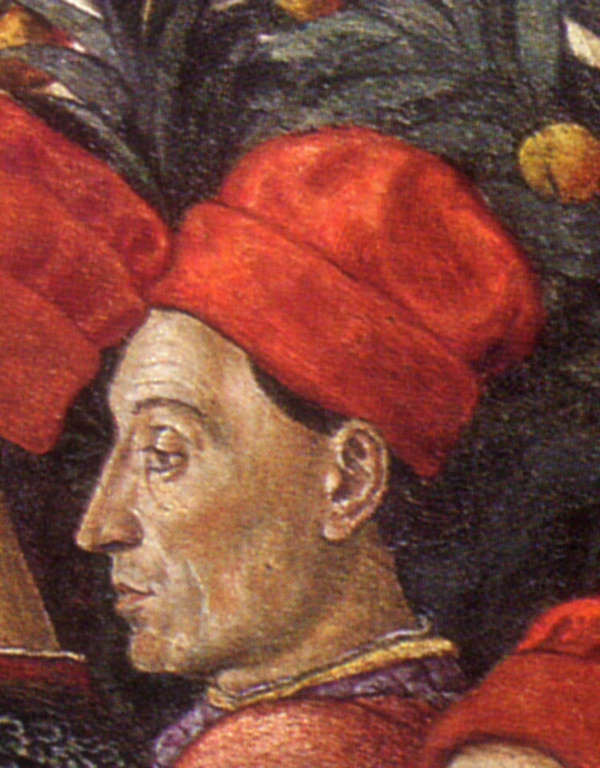
In 1435 Cyriacus of Ancona rediscovered the true nature of the Pyramids (fresco by Benozzo Gozzoli, 1459)

In 1435, the humanist Cyriacus of Ancona, the founding father of modern classical archaeology, went to Egypt, reached the Giza plateau after sailing on the Nile and climbed to the top of the Great Pyramid; Comparing what he saw with his reading of the second book of the "Histories" by Herodotus, he rediscovered the true nature of the Pyramids and correcting centuries of misunderstandings. Cyriacus of Ancona thus definitively refuted the false identification of the Great Pyramid with one of the Joseph's Granaries and left several drawings of the monument and an account, reported in his Commentarii. Thanks to his numerous travels in Greece and Asia Minor, he was also able to testify that the pyramids of Giza were the only one of the Seven Wonders of the World to have survived the centuries. Through the writings of Ciriaco, this news spread first in Italian humanist circles and then among European scholars. This, however, did not prevent many travellers and scholars from continuing to consider the Pyramids as granaries for several decades.

In 1436 the Spaniard Pero Tafur visited and left a rather fanciful account: "We went to see the Granaries of Joseph, which are three leagues from the mouth of the river, in the desert. Although they say that there are many more further inland, there are only three here, two great ones, and one lesser one. They are diamond shaped, with the apex raised, and they must be much higher than the Great Tower at Seville. As one enters through the door there is a wall joined to another, making a circular stairway which reaches to the top, with many windows. And the beasts, when they are laden, climb up and are unloaded through those windows, and so they fill the granaries to the top. Certainly I never thought that there was such a great building in the world to-day, nor have I seen the like before or since." Another curious interpretation was offered by Georges Lengherand, Mayor of Mons, who visited in 1486: "These granaries are very marvelous buildings and there used to be fourteen and now there are only six or seven. It is impossible to enter, and they are all of dressed stone ... and are in the manner of a hill ... And while we were there, we found four wolves asleep on the stones ... And around these granaries are small little chambers, several cut into the rock; I do not know what could be their use, unless at the time theses granaries were in existence there were guards in these little chambers." The German traveler Arnold von Harff paid a visit in 1497 and left a fairly objective report: "We went across the Nile to these three Kassa Pharaonis. As we approached near these three towers we saw that they were very strange buildings ... We climbed up outside for three full hours to the top, which is about two roods square. From there we saw far out over the whole of the land of Egypt, and over the country to Alexandria and the western sea ... They say that King Pharaoh caused the towers to be built during the lean years, and kept them full of corn. That is why they are called the Kassa Pharaonis. But I could find no entrance. Some say that they are the tombs of the old kings of Egypt."

There were also a number of travelers that saw difficulties with viewing the Pyramids as granaries. Anselmo Adorno traveled from Bruges in 1470 and gives a number of arguments against the prevailing view: "Facing Babylon, beyond the Nile, towards the desert that lies between Egypt and Africa, stand several ancient monuments pyramid-shaped, two of which are edifices constructed of very large stones, which are of considerable grandeur and amazing height. Some say that these were the granaries of Pharaoh, who had them filled with wheat during the seven years of great fertility, in anticipation of the seven lean years. They have not appeared to us to be granaries, but rather the tombs of some ancient personages, because we see no place where one could store, retrieve or preserve a crop for a year. Indeed, from top to bottom they are made of enormous stone well joined to each other, leaving them a little door at a good height above the ground, and a narrow and obscure path by which one descends to a room, not seen anywhere in the interior to be wide and spacious." For Felix Fabri, a Dominican friar from Ulm, who visited in 1483, the notion of them being granaries was the "mistaken opinion of the unlearned common people." Traveling with Fabri was Bernhard of Breidenbach, a wealthy canon of the cathedral at Mainz, who was also quite critical of the notion of granaries: "On the other side of the Nile we saw many pyramids, which long ago the kings of Egypt had erected over their tombs, of which the common people say are the granaries or storehouses that were built there by Joseph in order to store grain. However, this is clearly false, for these pyramids are not hollow inside."

== Renaissance ==
By the 16th century most visitors who left accounts argue against the notion that the pyramids were originally granaries constructed by the patriarch Joseph, if they mention it at all. Many of the visitors inspected the ruins rather closely, often entering the great Pyramid, rather than simply viewing them from a distance. The French traveler Greffin Affagart (Seigneur de Courteilles) visited the Pyramids in 1533 and noted that "some call [them] the granaries of Pharaoh, but this is wrong because they are not hollow on the inside, rather they are sepulchers of some kings of Egypt." The French explorer and naturalist Pierre Belon of Mans, a careful observer, records in 1546 that the great Pyramid "was the sepulcher of the King of Egypt." Another French explorer André Thevet, who visited three years later writes: "The Jews have told me many times that they find in their Chronicles that these Pyramids were the support of the granaries of Pharaoh: that is not likely ... they are sepulchers of kings as appears from Herodotus ... since I saw in one pyramid a great stone of marble carved in the manner of a sepulcher."

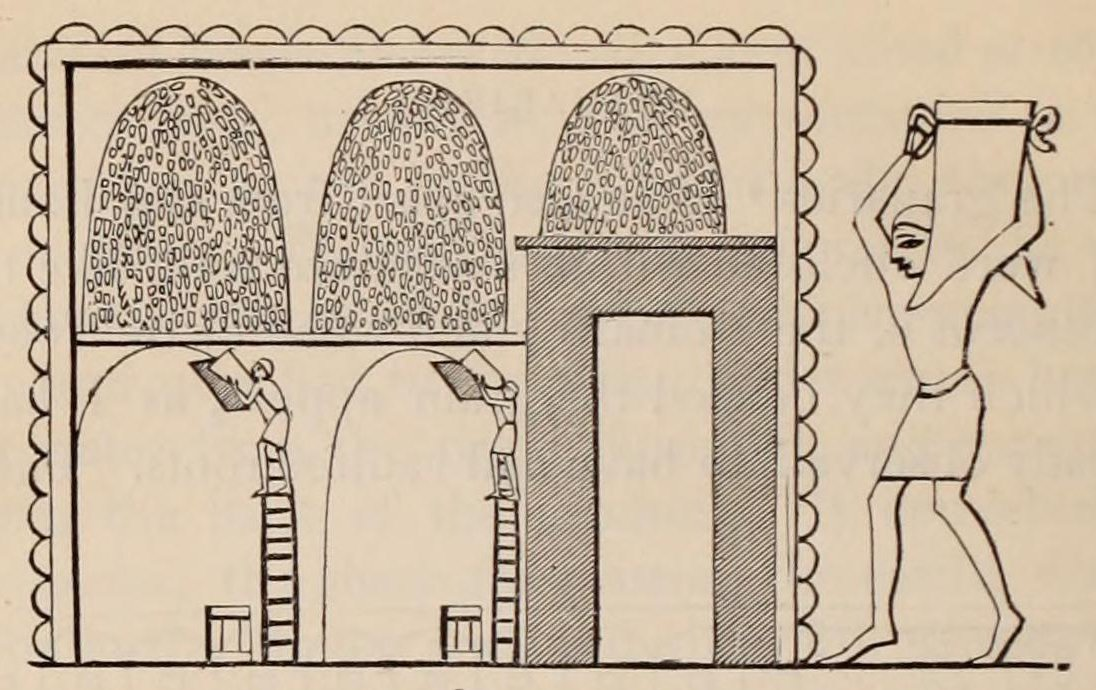
Egyptian granaries at Thebes.

Finally, in the 17th century, John Greaves, professor of astronomy at Oxford, published the first truly scientific work on the Pyramids, Pyramidographia (1646). He cites many of the ancient authors mentioned above, and dismisses the erroneous etymologies yielding notions of "receptacles and granaries," and calls attention to the obvious fact "that this figure is most improper for such a purpose, a Pyramid being the least capacious of any regular mathematical body, the straitness and fewness of the rooms within (the rest of the building being one solid and intire fabric of stone) do utterly over-throw this conjecture." No longer could the notion be held credibly, though for over a millennium it had reigned supreme among European travelers.

== Egyptian granaries ==
Ancient Egypt had one of the most successful and stable agricultural economies of the ancient world, and had both a system and facilities for grain storage: larger granaries were attached to temples and palaces, while smaller ones were dispersed within the town. There were essentially two types, one with a circular base, the other with a square or rectangular one. The circular granaries were shaped like beehives and were some 5 meters high and 2–3 meters in diameter. The grain was added through a door in the top by men standing on ladders, and was removed as needed from a similar door near the bottom. Very often these beehive storehouses were in groups of five or six and placed in a walled enclosure. The rectangular style of granary was constructed on similar principles, and though the side walls sloped gradually towards the top, where there was a flat roof, they were never of a true pyramidal form.

== See also ==
- Ancient Egyptian agriculture
