= Historia tripartita =

Historia tripartita or Tripartite History may refer to:

- Historia tripartita of Cassiodorus and Epiphanius
- Historia tripartita of Theodorus Lector
- Historia tripartita of Anastasius Bibliothecarius
- Historia tripartita of Bartholomew of Lucca
