= Mylopotamos =

Mylopotamos (Greek: Μυλοπόταμος) may refer to several places in Greece:

- Mylopotamos, Crete, a municipality in the Rethymno regional unit in the island of Crete
- Mylopotamos, Cyclades, a village on the island of Kea, Cyclades
- Mylopotamos, Drama, a village in the Drama regional unit, part of the Drama municipality
- Mylopotamos, Kythira, a village in the island of Kythira
- Mylopotamos, Magnesia, a village in Magnesia, part of the Mouresi municipality
- Mylopotamos, Mount Athos, a settlement in Mount Athos
- Neos Mylotopos (Greek: Νέος Μυλότοπος), a village in the Pella regional unit
- Palaios Mylotopos (Greek: Παλαιός Μυλότοπος), a village in the Pella regional unit
