= Maximilla (disambiguation) =

Maximilla (3rd century AD) was a prophetess and an early advocate of Montanism.

Maximilla may also refer to:

- Maximilla of Patras (1st century AD), apocryphal Christian saint
- Valeria Maximilla (fl. 293–312), Roman empress and wife of Emperor Maxentius
- Maximilla of Sicily (fl. 1137), daughter of Count Roger I of Sicily and wife of Ildebrandino VI of the Aldobrandeschi family
