= Monastery of Saint Epiphanius =

Archeological site near Luxor, Egypt

Coordinates: 25°44′03″N 32°36′30″E

The Monastery of Epiphanius is a monastery near in Luxor Governorate, Egypt, near the regional capital Luxor (ancient Thebes). It was founded by an anchorite named Epiphanius towards the end of the sixth century.

It was explored by an expedition from the Metropolitan Museum of Art, 1912–14.
