= Maximilla of Patras =

Maximilla of Patras is a major figure in the apocrypha of Saint Andrew.

The longest form of Maximilla's story is found in the Acts of Andrew. It is set during the reign of Nero (AD 54–68). Maximilla is the wife of the proconsul Aegeates in Patras. When she falls seriously ill, Aegeates vows to kill himself as soon as she dies. Andrew, arriving in Patras, is led to her by her servant Iphidama. He heals her and she becomes his disciple.

Maximilla and the other Christians meet with Andrew in her bedroom while Aegeates goes to Rome. When he returns, she refuses to sleep with him. Through a ruse, she induces the serving girl Euclia to taker he place in his bed for eight months. When Aegeates is informed, he tortures Euclia and crucifies the informants. He imprisons the apostle and threatens to have him killed if Maximilla does not resume their usual sexual activities. She visits Andrew in prison and he tells her that he is the new Adam and she the new Eve with the power to undo the error of the first Eve. Aegeates finally crucifies Andrew when the latter refuses to accept release. Maximilla then leaves him and he commits suicide. According to the Miracles of Andrew of Gregory of Tours, she emblamed and buried the apostle. According to the Epistle of the Presbyters and Deacons of Achaea, it was in her own tomb.

Maximilla is also mentioned in the Life of Andrew by Epiphanius the Monk; the Passion of Andrew, where he is not Aegeates' wife but another senator's, the Hypomnema on Andrew by Symeon Metaphrastes; the Martyrdom of Andrew; and the Story of Andrew.
