= The Travels of Sir John Mandeville =

14th-century travel memoir

The Travels of Sir John Mandeville or Mandeville's Travels is a book written between 1357 and 1371 that purports to be the travelogue of an Englishman named Sir John Mandeville around the world through many fanstastical locations. The earliest-surviving text is in French, followed by translations into many other languages; the work acquired extraordinary popularity. Despite the extremely unreliable and often fantastical nature of the travels it describes, it was used as a work of reference: Christopher Columbus, for example, was heavily influenced by both this work and Marco Polo's earlier Travels.

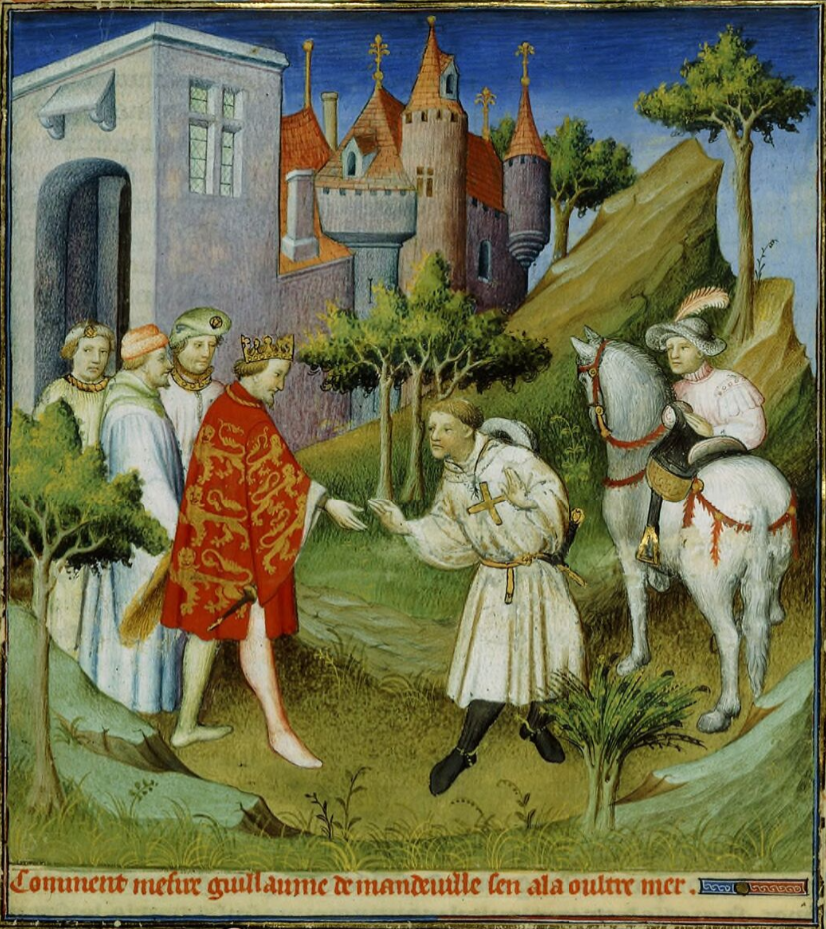
Jean de Mandeville is sent forth from England on his expedition by Edward II

According to the book, John de Mandeville crossed the sea in 1322. He traversed by way of Turkey (Asia Minor and Cilicia), Tartary, Persia, Armenia, the Holy Land, Syria, Arabia, Egypt, Libya, Abyssinia, Chaldea, the land of the Amazons, India, China and many countries in the region. He had often been to Jerusalem, and had written in Romance languages as they were generally more widely understood than Latin.

It is fairly clear that "Sir John Mandeville" was an invented author, and various suggestions have been put forward as to the real one. Most of these are figures from France or the Low Countries who had not travelled as widely as the author; none have achieved general acceptance. The book very largely depends on other travel books, sometimes embroidered with legendary or fantastical elements. Mandeville's Travels may contain facts and knowledge acquired by actual travels and residents in the East, at least in the sections focused on the Holy Land, Egypt, the Levant and the means of getting there. The prologue points almost exclusively to the Holy Land as the subject of the work. The mention of more distant regions comes in only towards the end of this prologue and (in a manner) as an afterthought. However, this is commensurate with Mandeville's emphasis on 'curiositas'—wandering—rather than Christian 'scientia' (knowledge).

== Sources evidently used ==
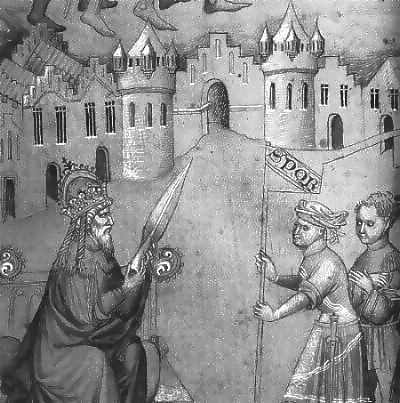
The emperor of Constantinople holding the Holy Lance, from a British Library manuscript

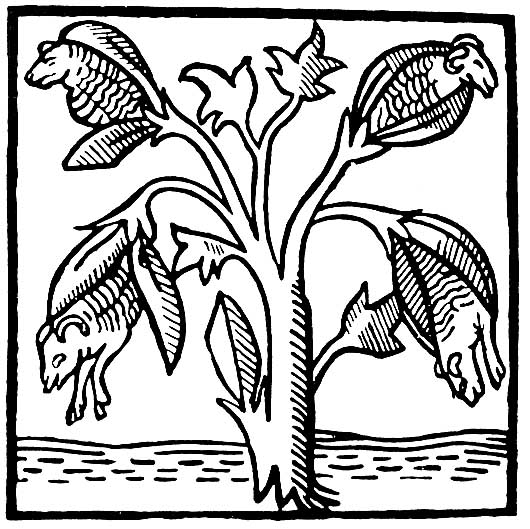
Cotton plant as imagined and drawn by John Mandeville; "There grew there [India] a wonderful tree which bore tiny lambs on the endes of its branches. These branches were so pliable that they bent down to allow the lambs to feed when they are hungrie." (compare vegetable lamb)

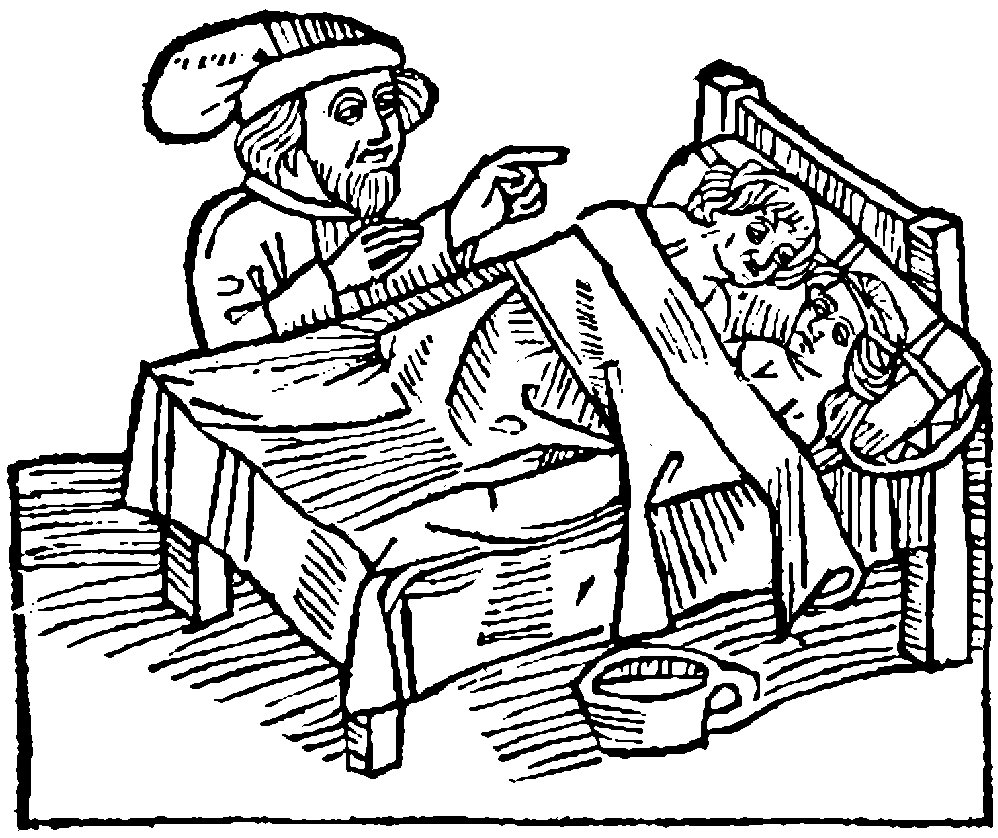
Illustration of a defloration rite (1484 edition)

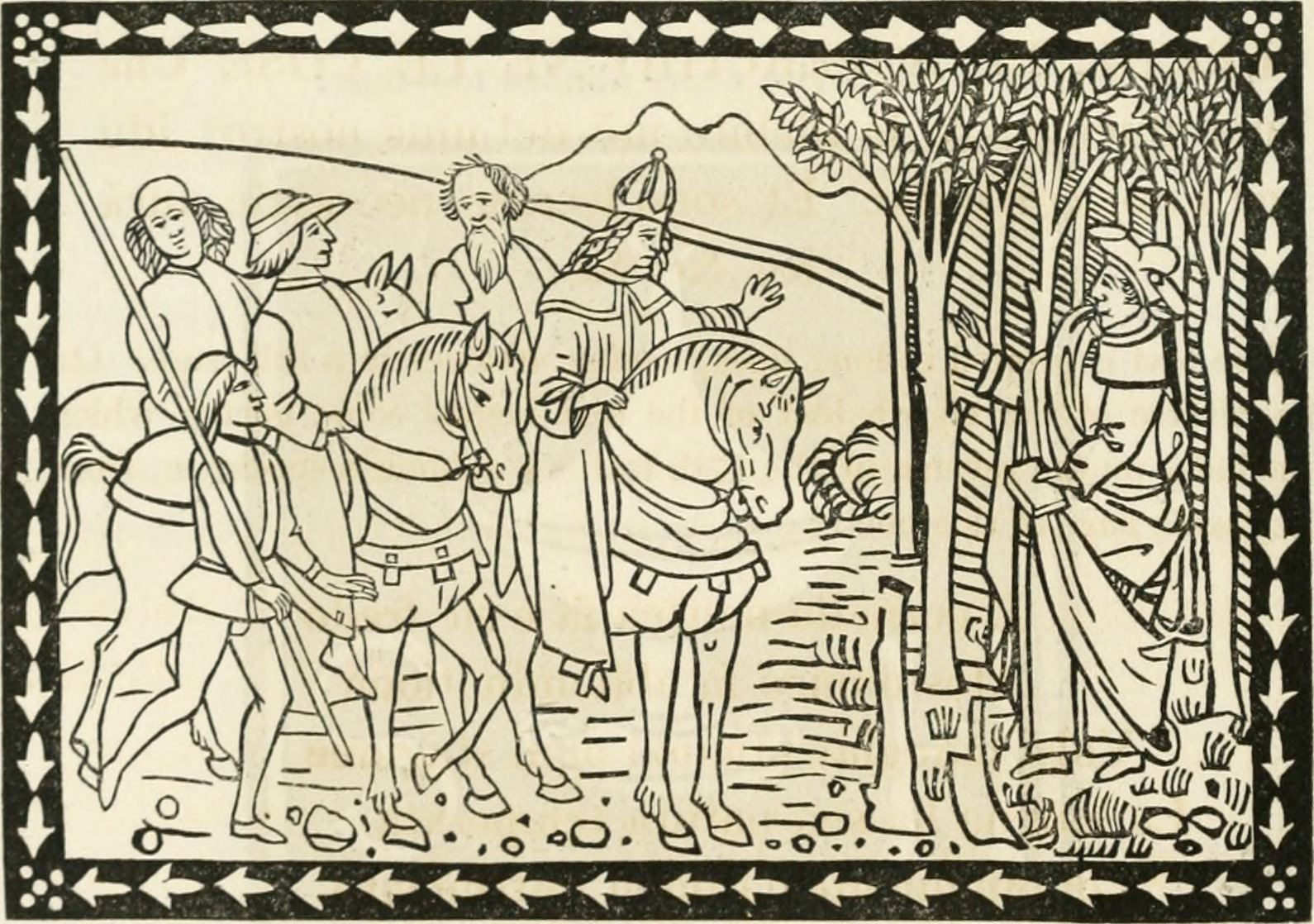
The only illustration in the Tractato delle piu maravegliose cosse, Bologna, 1492

The sources of the book have been laboriously investigated by Albert Bovenschen (Note: Die Quellen für die Reisebeschreibung des Johann von Mandeville, Inaugural-Dissertation . . . Leipzig (Berlin, 1888). This was revised and enlarged as "Untersuchungen über Johann von Mandeville und die Quellen seiner Reisebeschreibung", in the Zeitschrift der Gesellschaft für Erdkunde zu Berlin, Bd. 23, Heft 3 u. 4 (No. 135, 136).) and George F. Warner.

=== Odoric of Pordenone ===
The greater part of these more distant travels, extending from Trebizond to Hormuz, India, the Malay Archipelago and China, and back to western Asia, has been appropriated from the narrative of Friar Odoric (1330). These passages are almost always swollen with interpolated particulars, usually of an extravagant kind. (Note: Page indications like "Halliwell p. 209" refer to passages in the 1866 reissue of Halliwell's edition, (being probably the most ready of accessible to the authors of the article on ""Mandeville, Jehan de" in the Encyclopædia Britannica Eleventh Edition). However all these passages cited by the Encyclopædia were also verified by the authors as substantially occurring in Barrois's French MS. Nouv. Acq. Franç. 4515 in the Bibliothèque Nationale, Paris, (of 1371), cited B, and in that numbered xxxix. in the Grenville Manuscripts (British Library), which date probably from the early part of the 15th century, cited G. (Nicholson & Yule 1911, p. 561).) However, in a number of cases the writer has failed to understand those passages which he adopts from Odoric and professes to give as his own experiences. Thus, where Odoric has given a most curious and veracious account of the Chinese custom of employing tame cormorants to catch fish, the cormorants are converted by Mandeville into "little beasts called loyres which are taught to go into the water" (the word loyre being apparently used here for "otter", lutra, for which the Provençal is luria or loiria).

At a very early date the coincidence of Mandeville's stories with those of Odoric was recognized, insomuch that a manuscript of Odoric which is or was in the chapter library at Mainz begins with the words: "Incipit Itinerarius fidelis fratris Odorici socii Militis Mendavil per Indian; licet hic ille prius et alter posterius peregrinationem suam descripsit". ("Here begins the journey of the faithful Brother Odoric, the companion of the knight Mendavil through India; although here he described his journey first and the other afterwards.") At a later day Sir Thomas Herbert calls Odoric "travelling companion of our Sir John" Mandeville and anticipates criticism, in at least one passage, by suggesting the probability of his having travelled with Odoric.

=== Hetoum ===
Much of Mandeville's matter, particularly in Asiatic geography and history, is taken from the La Flor des Estoires d'Orient of Hetoum, an Armenian of princely family, who became a monk of the Praemonstrant or Premonstratensian order, and in 1307 dictated this work on the East, in the French tongue at Poitiers, out of his own acquaintance with Asia and its history in his own time. A story of the fortress at Corycus, or the Castle Sparrowhawk, appears in Mandeville's Book.

=== Marco Polo ===
No passage in Mandeville can be plausibly traced to Marco Polo, with one exception. This is where he states that at Hormuz the people during the great heat lie in water—a circumstance mentioned by Polo, though not by Odoric. It is most likely that this fact had been interpolated in the copy of Odoric used by Mandeville, for if he had borrowed it directly from Polo he could have borrowed more.

=== Giovanni da Pian del Carpine and Vincent de Beauvais ===
A good deal about the manners and customs of the Tatars is demonstrably derived from the work of the Franciscan Giovanni da Pian del Carpine, who went as the pope's ambassador to the Tatars in 1245–1247; but Dr. Warner considers that the immediate source for Mandeville was the Speculum historiale of Vincent de Beauvais. Though the passages in question are all to be found in Carpine more or less exactly, the expression is condensed and the order changed. For examples compare Mandeville, p. 250, on the tasks done by Tatar women, with Carpine, p. 643; Mandeville. p. 250, on Tatar habits of eating, with Carpine, pp. 639–640; Mandeville, p. 231, on the titles borne on the seals of the Great Khan, with Carpine, p. 715, etc.

The account of Prester John, taken from Johannine epistles, was widely diffused in the 13th century. Many fabulous stories of monsters, such as Cyclopes, sciapodes, hippopodes, anthropophagi, monoscelides, and men whose heads did grow beneath their shoulders; of the phoenix and the weeping crocodile, such as Pliny has collected, are introduced here and there, possibly inspired by him, Solinus, the bestiaries, or the Speculum naturale of Vincent de Beauvais. Interspersed, especially in the chapters about the Levant, are stories and legends that were told to pilgrims, such as the legend of Seth and the grains of paradise from which grew the wood of the cross; of the shooting of Cain by Lamech; of the castle of the sparrow-hawk (which appears in the tale of Melusine), those of the origin of the balsam plants at Masariya, of the dragon of Cos, of the river Sambation, and others.

== Authorship ==
In the preface, the compiler calls himself a knight, and states that he was born and bred in England, in the town of St Albans. Although the book is real, it is widely believed that "Sir John Mandeville" himself was not. Common theories point to a Frenchman by the name of Jehan à la Barbe.

Some more recent scholars have suggested that Mandeville's Travels was most likely written by Jan de Langhe, a Fleming who wrote in Latin under the name Johannes Longus. Jan de Langhe was born in Ypres early in the 1300s and by 1334 had become a Benedictine monk at the abbey of Saint-Bertin in Saint-Omer, about 20 miles from Calais. After studying law at the University of Paris, Langhe returned to the abbey and was elected abbot in 1365. He was a prolific writer and avid collector of travelogues, right up to his death in 1383.

=== Contemporary corroboration ===
At least part of Mandeville's Travels and the life of John Mandeville is mere invention. No contemporary corroboration of the existence of such a Jehan de Mandeville is known. Some French manuscripts, not contemporary, give a Latin letter of presentation from him to Edward III of England, but so vague that it might have been penned by any writer on any subject.

Compilation is thought, in large part, to have come from a Liège physician known as Johains à le Barbe or Jehan à la Barbe, otherwise Jehan de Bourgogne. Evidence for this comes from a modernized extract quoted by the Liège herald, Louis Abry (1643–1720), (Note: Quoted from him by the contemporary Liége herald, Lefort, and from Lefort in 1866 by S. Bormans. J. Vogels communicated it in 1884 to Mr E. W. B. Nicholson, who wrote on it in the Academy of 12 April 1884 (Nicholson & Yule 1911, p. 561).) from the lost fourth book of the Myreur des Hystors of Johans des Preis, styled d'Oultremouse. In this, "Jean de Bourgogne, dit a la Barbe" is said to have revealed himself on his deathbed to d'Oultremouse, whom he made his executor, and to have described himself in his will as "messire Jean de Mandeville, chevalier, comte de Montfort en Angleterre et seigneur de l'isle de Campdi et du château Pérouse (Lord Jean de Mandeville, knight, Count de Montfort in England and lord of the Isle of Campdi and the castle Pérouse)".

It is added that, having had the misfortune to kill an unnamed count in his own country, he engaged himself to travel through the three parts of the world, arrived at Liège in 1343, was a great naturalist, profound philosopher and astrologer, and had a remarkable knowledge of physics. The identification is confirmed by the fact that in the now destroyed church of the Guillemins was a tombstone of Mandeville, with a Latin inscription stating that he was otherwise named "ad Barbam", was a professor of medicine, and died at Liège on 17 November 1372: this inscription is quoted as far back as 1462.

Even before his death, the Liège physician seems to have confessed to a share in the circulation of, and additions to, the work. In the common Latin abridged version of it, at the end of c. vii., the author says that when stopping in the sultan's court at Cairo he met a venerable and expert physician of "our" parts, but that they rarely came into conversation because their duties were of a different kind, but that long afterwards at Liège he composed this treatise at the exhortation and with the help (Jiortatu et adiutorio) of the same venerable man, as he will narrate at the end of it.

And in the last chapter, he says that in 1355, on returning home, he came to Liège, and being laid up with old age and arthritic gout in the street called Bassesavenyr, i.e. Basse-Sauvenière, consulted the physicians. That one came in who was more venerable than the others by reason of his age and white hairs, was evidently expert in his art, and was commonly called Magister Iohannes ad Barbam. That a chance remark of the latter caused the renewal of their old Cairo acquaintance, and that Ad Barbam, after showing his medical skill on Mandeville, urgently begged him to write his travels; "and so at length, by his advice and help, monitu et adiutorio, was composed this treatise, of which I had certainly proposed to write nothing until at least I had reached my own parts in England". He goes on to speak of himself as being now lodged in Liège, "which is only two days distant from the sea of England"; and it is stated in the colophon (and in the manuscripts) that the book was first published in French by Mandeville, its author, in 1355, at Liège, and soon after in the same city translated into "said" Latin form. Moreover, a manuscript of the French text extant at Liège about 1860 contained a similar statement, and added that the author lodged at a hostel called "al hoste Henkin Levo": this manuscript gave the physician's name as "Johains de Bourgogne dit ale barbe", which doubtless conveys its local form.

=== Contemporary mentions ===
There is no contemporary English mention of any English knight named Jehan de Mandeville, nor are the arms said to have been on the Liège tomb like any known Mandeville arms. However, George F. Warner (Note: Sir George F. Warner (1845–1936) author of the DNB article on John Mandeville (Warner 1893).) has suggested that de Bourgogne may be a certain Johan de Bourgoyne, who was pardoned by parliament on 20 August 1321 for having taken part in the attack on the Despensers (Hugh the Younger and Hugh the Elder), but whose pardon was revoked in May 1322, the year in which "Mandeville" professes to have left England. Among the persons similarly pardoned on the recommendation of the same nobleman was a Johan Mangevilayn, whose name appears related to that of "de Mandeville", (Note: The de Mandevilles, earls of Essex, were originally styled de Magneville, and Leland, in his Comm. de Script. Britt. (CDV), calls our Mandeville himself "Joannes Magnovillanus, alias Mandeville" (Nicholson & Yule 1911, p. 561).) which is a later form of "de Magneville".

The name Mangevilain occurs in Yorkshire as early as the 16th year of the reign of Henry I of England, (Note: Nicholson & Yule 1911, p. 561 cite 16 Hen. I. Pipe Roll Society, vol. xv, p. 40. 16th year of the reign of Henry I is the year starting on 5 August 1115 (see Regnal years of English monarchs).) but is very rare, and (failing evidence of any place named Mangeville) seems to be merely a variant spelling of Magnevillain. The meaning may be simply "of Magneville", de Magneville; but the family of a 14th-century bishop of Nevers were called both "Mandevilain" and "de Mandevilain", where Mandevilain seems a derivative place-name, meaning the Magneville or Mandeville district. The name "de Mandeville" might be suggested to de Bourgogne by that of his fellow culprit Mangevilayn, and it is even possible that the two fled to England together, were in Egypt together, met again at Liège, and shared in the compilation of the Travels.

Whether after the appearance of the Travels either de Bourgogne or "Mangevilayn" visited England is very doubtful. St Albans Abbey had a sapphire ring, and Canterbury a crystal orb, said to have been given by Mandeville; but these might have been sent from Liège, and it will appear later that the Liège physician possessed and wrote about precious stones. St Albans also had a legend, recorded in John Norden's Speculum Britanniae (1596) that a ruined marble tomb of Mandeville (represented cross-legged and in armour, with sword and shield) once stood in the abbey; this may be true of "Mangevilayn" or it may be apocryphal. There is also an inscription near the entrance of St Albans Abbey, which reads as follows:

Siste gradum properans, requiescit Mandevil urna, Hic humili; norunt et monumental mori
Lo, in this Inn of travellers doth lie, One rich in nothing but in memory; His name was Sir John Mandeville; content, Having seen much, with a small continent, Toward which he travelled ever since his birth, And at last pawned his body for ye earth Which by a statute must in mortgage be, Till a Redeemer come to set it free.

== Possible representation of genuine experiences ==
Even in those parts of the book which might be supposed to represent some genuine experience, there are the plainest traces that another work has been made use of. This is the itinerary of the German knight Wilhelm von Boldensele, written in 1336 at the desire of Cardinal Hélie de Talleyrand-Périgord. A cursory comparison of this with Mandeville leaves no doubt that the latter has followed its thread, though digressing on every side, and too often eliminating the singular good sense of the German traveler. Examples include Boldensele's account of Cyprus, of Tyre and the coast of the Holy Land, of the journey from Gaza to Egypt, passages about Babylon of Egypt, about Mecca, the general account of Egypt, the pyramids, some of the wonders of Cairo, such as the slave-market, the chicken-hatching stoves, and the apples of paradise (i.e., plantains), the Red Sea, the convent on Sinai, the account of the church of the Holy Sepulchre, etc.

As an example, when discussing the pyramids, Boldensele wrote that "the people of the country call them Pharaoh's Granaries. But this cannot be true at all, for no place for putting in the wheat can be found there". Mandeville then completely reverses it in favor of the received medieval opinion: "Some say that they are tombs of the great lords of antiquity, but that is not true, for the common word through the whole country near and far is that they are Joseph's Granaries ... [for] if they were tombs, they would not be empty inside".

There is, indeed, only a small residuum of the book to which genuine character, as containing the experiences of the author, can possibly be attributed. Yet, as has been intimated, the borrowed stories are frequently claimed as such experiences. In addition to those already mentioned, he alleges that he had witnessed the curious exhibition of the garden of transmigrated souls (described by Odoric) at Cansay, i.e., Hangzhou. He and his fellows with their valets had remained fifteen months in service with Kublai Khan, the Emperor of Cathay in his wars against the King of Manzi, or Southern China, which had ceased to be a separate kingdom some seventy years before.

The most notable of these false statements occurs in his adoption from Odoric of the story of the Valley Perilous. This is, in its original form, apparently founded on real experiences of Odoric viewed through a haze of excitement and superstition. Mandeville, while swelling the wonders of the tale with a variety of extravagant touches, appears to safeguard himself from the reader's possible discovery that it was stolen by the interpolation: "And some of our fellows accorded to enter, and some not. So there were with us two worthy men, Friars Minor, that were of Lombardy, who said that if any man would enter they would go in with us. And when they had said so, upon the gracious trust of God and of them, we caused mass to be sung, and made every man to be shriven and houselled; and then we entered fourteen persons; but at our going out we were but nine".

In referring to this passage, it is only fair to recognize that the description (though the suggestion of the greatest part exists in Odoric) displays a good deal of imaginative power; and there is much in the account of Christian's passage through the Valley of the Shadow of Death, in John Bunyan's famous allegory, which indicates a possibility that Bunyan may have read and remembered this episode either in Mandeville or in Hakluyt's Odoric.

It does not follow that the whole work is borrowed or fictitious. Even the great Moorish traveller Ibn Battuta, accurate and veracious in the main, seems—in one part at least of his narrative—to invent experiences; and, in such works as those of Jan van Hees and Arnold von Harff are examples of pilgrims to the Holy Land whose narratives begin apparently in sober truth, and gradually pass into flourishes of fiction and extravagance. In Mandeville also are particulars not yet traced to other writers, and which may therefore be provisionally assigned either to the writer's own experience or to knowledge acquired by colloquial intercourse in the East.

Whether Mandeville actually travelled or not, he would not necessarily be intentionally making the story up. All travel narratives from this time used the same sources, taken from each other or from the earlier traditions of the Greeks. This tradition was an integral part of such narratives to make them believable (or at least acceptable) to the readers.

=== On Egypt ===
It is difficult to decide on the character of his statements as to recent Egyptian history. In his account of that country, though the series of the Comanian (of the Bahri dynasty) sultans is borrowed from Hetoum down to the accession of Mel echnasser (Al-Nasir Muhammad), who came first to the throne in 1293, Mandeville appears to speak from his own knowledge when he adds that this "Melechnasser reigned long and governed wisely". In fact, though twice displaced in the early part of his life, Al-Nasir Muhammad reigned until 1341, a duration unparalleled in Muslim Egypt, while the work describes that during the last thirty years of his reign, Egypt rose to a high pitch of wealth and prosperity.

Mandeville, however, then goes on to say that his eldest son, Melechemader, was chosen to succeed; but this prince was caused privily to be slain by his brother, who took the kingdom under the name of Meleclimadabron. "And he was Soldan when I departed from those countries". Now Al-Nasir Muhammad was followed in succession by no less than eight of his sons in thirteen years, the first three of whom reigned in aggregate only a few months. The names mentioned by Mandeville appear to represent those of the fourth and sixth of the eight, viz. al-Salih Ismail and al-Muzzafar Hajji; and these the statements of Mandeville do not fit.

=== Words ===
On several occasions, Arabic words are given, but are not always recognizable, owing perhaps to the carelessness of copyists in such matters. Thus, we find the names (not satisfactorily identified) of the wood, fruit and sap of the Himalayan Balsam; of bitumen, "alkatran" (al-Kāṭrān); of the three different kinds of pepper (long pepper, black pepper and white pepper) as sorbotin, fulful and bano or bauo (fulful is the common Arabic word for pepper; the others have not been satisfactorily explained). But these, and the particulars of his narrative for which no literary sources have yet been found, are too few to constitute a proof of personal experience.

=== Geographic ===
Mandeville, again, in some passages shows a correct idea of the form of the earth, and of position in latitude ascertained by observation of the pole star; he knows that there are antipodes, and that if ships were sent on voyages of discovery they might sail round the world. And he tells a curious story, which he had heard in his youth, how a worthy man did travel ever eastward until he came to his own country again. But he repeatedly asserts the old belief that Jerusalem was in the centre of the world, and maintains in proof of this that at the equinox a spear planted erect in Jerusalem casts no shadow at noon, which, if true, would equally consist with the sphericity of the earth, provided that the city were on the equator.

== Manuscripts and translations ==
The oldest known manuscript of the original—once Jean-Baptiste-Joseph Barrois's, afterwards Bertram Ashburnham, 4th Earl of Ashburnham's, now Nouv. Acq. Franc. 4515 in the Bibliothèque nationale de France—is dated 1371, but is nevertheless very inaccurate in proper names. An early printed Latin translation made from the French has been already quoted, but four others, unprinted, have been discovered by Johann Vogels. (Note: Die ungedruckten lateinischen Versionen Mandeville's (Crefeld, 1886).) They exist in eight manuscripts, of which seven are in Great Britain, while the eighth was copied by a monk of Abingdon; probably, therefore, all these unprinted translations were executed in Great Britain.

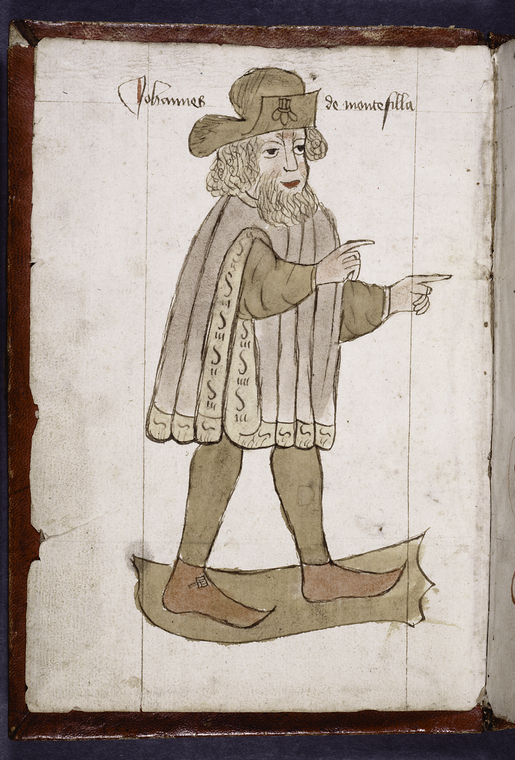
Portrait of Sir John Mandeville, manuscript of 1459

From one of them, according to Vogels, an English version was made which has never been printed and is now extant only in free abbreviations, contained in two 15th-century manuscripts in the Bodleian Library—manuscript e Museo 116, and manuscript Rawlinson D.99: the former, which is the better, is in East Midlands English, and may possibly have belonged to the Augustinian priory of St Osyth in Essex, while the latter is in Southern Middle English.

The first English translation direct from the French was made (at least as early as the beginning of the 15th century) from a manuscript of which many pages were lost. (Note: Nicholson & Yule (1911) state: Dr Vogels controverts these positions, arguing that the first English version from the French was the complete Cotton text, and that the defective English copies were made from a defective English MS. His supposed evidences of the priority of the Cotton text equally consist with its being a later revision, and for Roys Ils in the defective English MSS. he has only offered a laboured and improbable explanation.) Writing of the name 'Califfes', the author says that it is taut a dire come rol (s). II y soleit auoir V. soudans "as much as to say king. There used to be 5 sultans". In the defective French manuscript a page ended with Il y so; then came a gap, and the next page went on with part of the description of Mount Sinai, Et est celle vallee mult froide. Consequently, the corresponding English version has "That ys to say amonge hem Roys Ils and this vale ys ful colde"! All English printed texts before 1725, and Ashton's 1887 edition, follow these defective copies, and in only two known manuscripts has the lacuna been detected and filled up.

One of them is the British Library manuscript Egerton MS 1982 (Northern dialect, about 1410–1420 ?), in which, according to Vogels, the corresponding portion has been borrowed from that English version which had already been made from the Latin. The other is in the British Library manuscript Cotton Titus Grenville Collection c. 1410 xvi. (Midland dialect, about 1410–1420?), representing a text completed, and revised throughout, from the French, though not by a competent hand. The Egerton text, edited by George Warner, has been printed by the Roxburghe Club, while the Cotton text, first printed in 1725–27, is in modern reprints the current English version.

That none of the forms of the English version can be from the same hand which wrote the original is made patent by their glaring errors of translation, but the Cotton text asserts in the preface that it was made by Mandeville himself, and this assertion was until lately taken on trust by almost all modern historians of English literature. The words of the original "je eusse cest livret mis en latin ... mais ... je l'ay mis en rōmant" were mistranslated as if "je eusse" meant "I had" instead of "I should have", and then (whether of fraudulent intent or by the error of a copyist thinking to supply an accidental omission) the words were added "and translated it aȝen out of Frensche into Englyssche." Mätzner seems to have been the first to show that the current English text cannot possibly have been made by Mandeville himself. Of the original French there is no satisfactory edition, but Vogels has undertaken a critical text, and Warner has added to his Egerton English text the French of a British Library manuscript, with variants from three others.

An illuminated Middle English copy c. 1440, possibly from Bersted, Kent, fetched £289,250 at a London auction in June 2011.

Mandeville's work was translated into Early Modern Irish around 1475.

== Other works using the name ==
There are certain other works bearing the name of Mandeville or de Bourgogne.

MS. Add. C. 280 in the Bodleian appends to the Travels a short French life of St Alban of Germany, the author of which calls himself Johan Mandivill[e], knight, formerly of the town of St Alban, and says he writes to correct an impression prevalent among his countrymen that there was no other saint of the name: this life is followed by part of a French herbal.

To Mandeville (by whom de Bourgogne is clearly meant) Jean d'Outremeuse (Note: Stanislas Bormans, Introduction to d'Oultremouse's Chronicle, pp. lxxxix., xc.; see also Warner's edition of the Travels, p. xxxv. The ascription is on ff. 5 and 6 of Le Tresorier de philosophie naturele des pierres precieuses, an unprinted work by d'Oultremouse in MS. Fonds français 12326 of the Bibliothèque Nationale, Paris. The passage about Alexandria is on f. 81.) ascribes a Latin "lappidaire selon l'oppinion des Indois", from which he quotes twelve passages, stating that the author (whom he calls knight, lord of Montfort, of Castelperouse, and of the isle of Campdi) had been "baillez en Alexandrie" seven years, and had been presented by a Saracen friend with some fine jewels which had passed into d'Outremeuse's own possession: of this Lapidaire, a French version, which seems to have been completed after 1479, has been several times printed. A manuscript of Mandeville's travels offered for sale in 1862 (Note: Description ... d'une collection ... d'anciens manuscrits ... réunis par les soins de M. J. Techener, pt. i. (Paris, 1862), p. 159 (referred to by Pannier, pp. 193-194).) is said to have been divided into five books:

1. The travels
2. De là forme de la terre et comment et par quelle manière elle fut faite
3. De la forme del ciel
4. Des herbes selon les yndois et les phulosophes par de là
5. Ly lapidaire

while the cataloguer supposed Mandeville to have been the author of a concluding piece entitled La Venianche de nostre Signeur Jhesu-Crist fayle par Vespasian fit del empereur de Romme et commeet lozeph daramathye fu deliures de la prizon. From the treatise on herbs a passage is quoted asserting it to have been composed in 1357 in honour of the author's natural lord, Edward III, king of England. This date is corroborated by the title of king of Scotland given to Edward, who had received from Baliol the surrender of the crown and kingly dignity on 20 January 1356, but on 3 October 1357 released King David and made peace with Scotland: unfortunately it is not recorded whether the treatise contains the author's name, and, if so, what name.

Tanner (Bibliotheca) alleges that Mandeville wrote several books on medicine, and among the Ashmolean manuscripts in the Bodleian Library are a medical receipt by John de Magna Villa (No. 2479), an aichemical receipt by him (No. 1407), and another alchemical receipt by Johannes de Villa Magna (No. 1441).

Finally, de Bourgogne wrote under his own name a treatise on the plague, extant in Latin, French and English texts, and in Latin and English abridgments. Herein he describes himself as Johannes de Burgundia, otherwise called cum Barba, citizen of Liège and professor of the art of medicine; says that he had practised forty years and had been in Liège in the plague of 1365; and adds that he had previously written a treatise on the cause of the plague, according to the indications of astrology (beginning Deus deorum) and another on distinguishing pestilential diseases (beginning Cum nimium propter instans tempus epidimiate). "Burgundia" is sometimes corrupted into "Burdegalia", and in English translations of the abridgment almost always appears as "Burdews" (Bordeaux, France) or the like manuscript Rawlinson D. 251 (15th century) in the Bodleian Library also contains a large number of English medical receipts, headed "Practica phisicalia Magistri Johannis de Burgundia".

== Dedications ==
- The orchestral work Hoc Vinces! by Svitlana Azarova is dedicated Sir John Mandeville, and people like him, who inspired others to perform great feats (Christopher Columbus, Da Vinci and Shakespeare), and to people who perpetuate "spirit" from generation to generation

== See also ==
- Menocchio
