= Minuscule 49 =

- New Testament manuscript
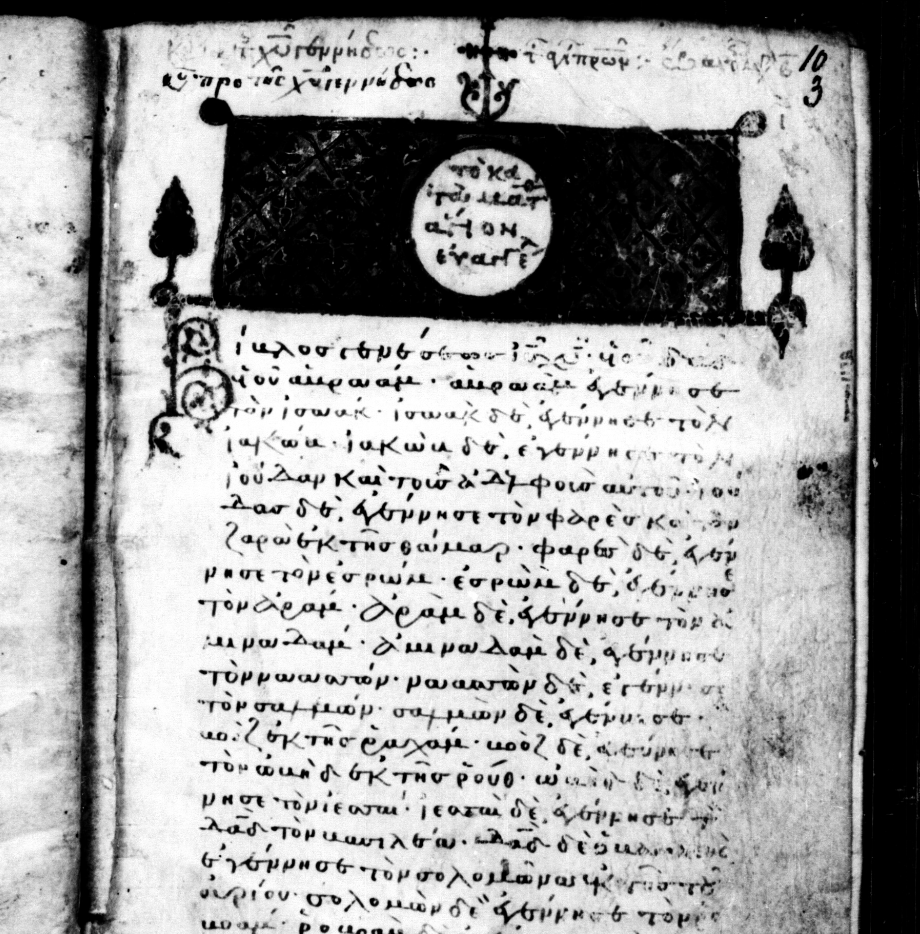
- Text: Gospels
- Date: 12th century
- Script: Greek
- Found: 1628, Thomas Roe
- Now at: Bodleian Library
- Size: 14.5 cm by 11 cm
- Type: Byzantine text-type
- Category: V
- Note: full marginalia

Minuscule 49 (in the Gregory-Aland numbering), ε 155 (von Soden), is a Greek minuscule manuscript of the New Testament, on parchment leaves. Paleographically it has been assigned to the 12th century. It has complex contents and full marginalia.

== Description ==
The codex contains the complete text of the four Gospels on 223 parchment leaves (size 14.5 cm by 11 cm). The text is written stichometrically in one column per page, 26-27 lines per page. After the biblical text followed "Historia tripartita" of Cassiodorus in Lombards language.

The text is divided according to the κεφαλαια (chapters), whose numerals are given at the margin, and their τιτλοι (titles) at the top of the pages. There is also another division according to the smaller Ammonian Sections, with some references to the Eusebian Canons.

It contains the Eusebian Canon tables at the beginning of the manuscript, tables of the κεφαλαια (tables of contents) before each Gospel, lectionary equipment at the margin (for liturgical use), subscriptions at the end of the Gospels, and numbers of στιχοι to the Gospel of Luke.

== Text ==
The Greek text of the codex is a representative of the Byzantine text-type. Hermann von Soden classified it to the textual family K^{x}. Kurt Aland placed it in Category V. According to the Claremont Profile Method it belongs to the textual family Family K^{x} in Luke 1 and Luke 10. In Luke 20 it represents family Πa.

== History ==
The manuscript was dated by Gregory to the 11th or 12th century. Currently it has been assigned by the INTF to the 12th century.

The manuscript was brought from Turkey about 1628 together with Codex Alexandrinus, by the English ambassador at the court of Sultan, Sir Thomas Roe. It was examined by John Mill (as Roe 1).

It was added to the list of the New Testament manuscripts by J. J. Wettstein. C. R. Gregory saw it in 1883.

Since 1628 it has been housed at the Bodleian Library (MS. Roe 1), at Oxford.

== See also ==
- List of New Testament minuscules
- Biblical manuscript
- Textual criticism
