= Historiae Ecclesiasticae Tripartitae Epitome =

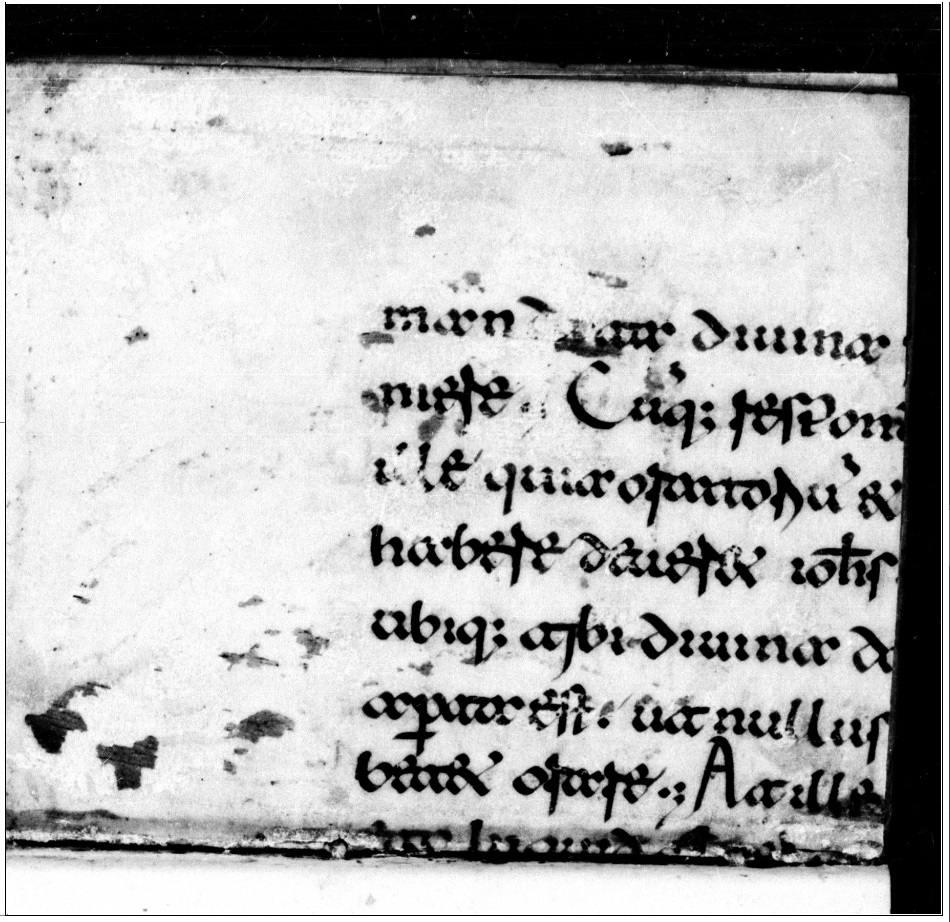
Minuscule 49, with fragment of Historia tripartita.

Historiae Ecclesiasticae Tripartitae Epitome, the abridged history (in twelve books) of the early Christian Church known as the Tripartite History, was the standard manual of Church history in Medieval Europe.

The work, dated to around 550 AD, consists of a compilation of church histories, parts of which were selected by Cassiodorus, and translated into Latin by Epiphanius Scholasticus. It epitomized three Greek works in particular, the church histories of Socrates Scholasticus, Sozomen and Theodoret, written in the previous century. An Italian theory posited its composition around 510 AD, arguing that the work was composed using the library Cassiodorus assembled at the Monasterium Vivariense, the monastery of Vivarium on his family estates at the foot of Mount Moscius on the shores of the Ionian Sea. It is now thought to have been composed several decades later, in Constantinople, around the time the crisis in relations between Justinian and the Western Church, around 550 AD.

It describes a history of the Church from the year 324 to the year 439.

The book attained a high reputation. Only Eusebius' History, in a Latin translation by Rufinus, competed with it as the official version of church history in the West, until original sources began to be rediscovered, edited and printed by humanist scholars in the 15th century.

== Sources ==
- Van Hoof, Lieve; Van Nuffelen, Peter (2017). "The Historiography of Crisis". The Journal of Roman Studies. 107: 275–300. doi:10.1017/S0075435817000284. JSTOR 26576052. S2CID 232343702.
- Historia ecclesiastica tripartita: historiae ecclesiasticae ex Socrate CSEL vol. LXXI, Vindobonae 1952.
