= Epiphanios of Mylopotamos =

Greek Orthodox monk and chef

- Born: 1956; Nikisiani, Kavala, Greece
- Died: 11 December 2020 (aged 63–64); Mylopotamos, Mount Athos
- Other name: Epifanios Mylopotaminos
- Occupation: Monk
- Known for: Cuisine of Mount Athos
- Notable work: The Cuisine of the Holy Mountain Athos

Epiphanios of Mylopotamos (Greek: Επιφάνιος ο Μυλοποταμινός, romanized: Epifanios o Mylopotaminos; born 1956, Nikisiani, Kavala; died 11 December 2020, Mylopotamos, Mount Athos), also known as Epifanios Mylopotaminos, was a Greek Orthodox monk and chef. He is best known for publicizing the gastronomy and viticulture of Mount Athos to the wider world.

== Life ==
He was born and raised in Nikisiani, Kavala, northern Greece in 1956. He became a monk at Mount Athos in 1973. Initially, he was a monk at the Monastery of Agiou Pavlou. In the 1980s, he also lived briefly at the Monastery of Saint Catherine in the Sinai Peninsula of Egypt. He went to Mylopotamos in 1990 and bought the area for 2 million drachma, or about 6,000 euros, from the Monastery of Great Lavra.

Since 1990, Father Epiphanios has lived in the Skete of St. Eustathius, a dependency of the Monastery of Great Lavra located in Mylopotamos. He spent most of his time at Mylopotamos, where he helped restore the monastic buildings. There, he built and maintained a vineyard and winery and was responsible for making Mylopotamos wine well known across the world.

He died from cancer on 11 December 2020 at the age of 64.

== Publications ==
Epiphanios' best-known book is The Cuisine of the Holy Mountain Athos (ISBN 9789603983354). The book, originally written in Greek (title: Μαγειρική του Αγίου Όρους), has been translated into various languages, including English, Russian, Bulgarian, and Romanian. The book contains more than 120 recipes and many full-page photographs.
