= Mylopotamos, Mount Athos =

Mylopotamos Μυλοπόταμος
- Settlement
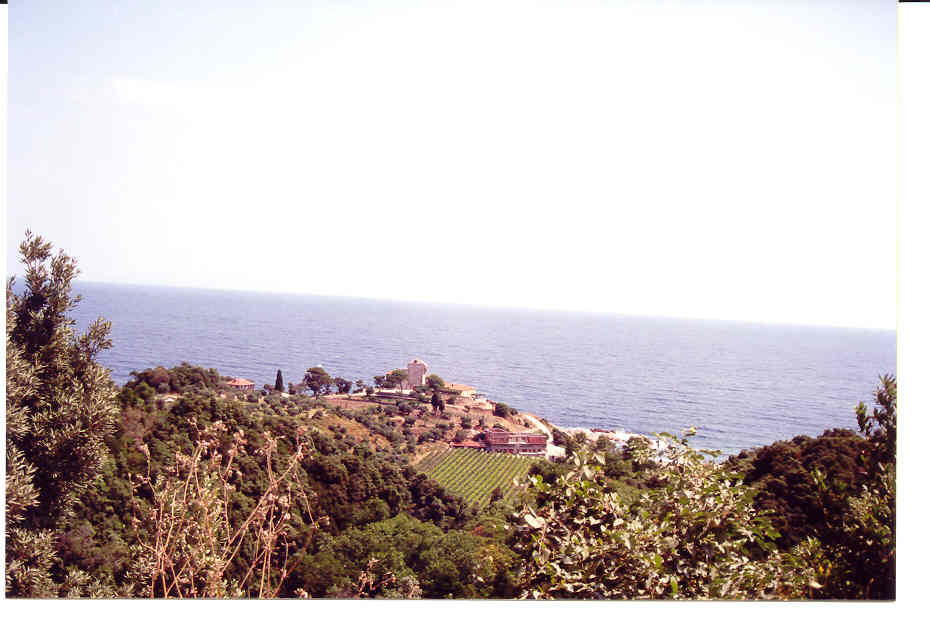
- View of Mylopotamos

- Location within Greece
- Coordinates: 40°14′16″N 24°18′10″E
- Country: Greece
- Administrative region: Mount Athos
- Time zone: UTC+2 (EET)
  - Summer (DST): UTC+3 (EEST)

Mylopotamos (Greek: Μυλοπόταμος) is a settlement in Mount Athos. It is located just to the northwest of the arsanas (harbor) of Filotheou Monastery. The seat of Mylopotamos is known as the kathisma of Agios Efstathios.

Mylopotamos, a dependency of the Monastery of Great Lavra, is known for its winery and vineyards.

In 1990, Father Epiphanios of Mylopotamos bought Mylopotamos area from the Monastery of Great Lavra for 2 million drachma, or about 6,000 euros. Epiphanios revived Mylopotamos, which was dilapidated when he arrived there in 1990, and made it well-known across the world as a center of Athonite cooking and gastronomy.
