= Arnold von Harff =

German traveler and author (1471–1505)

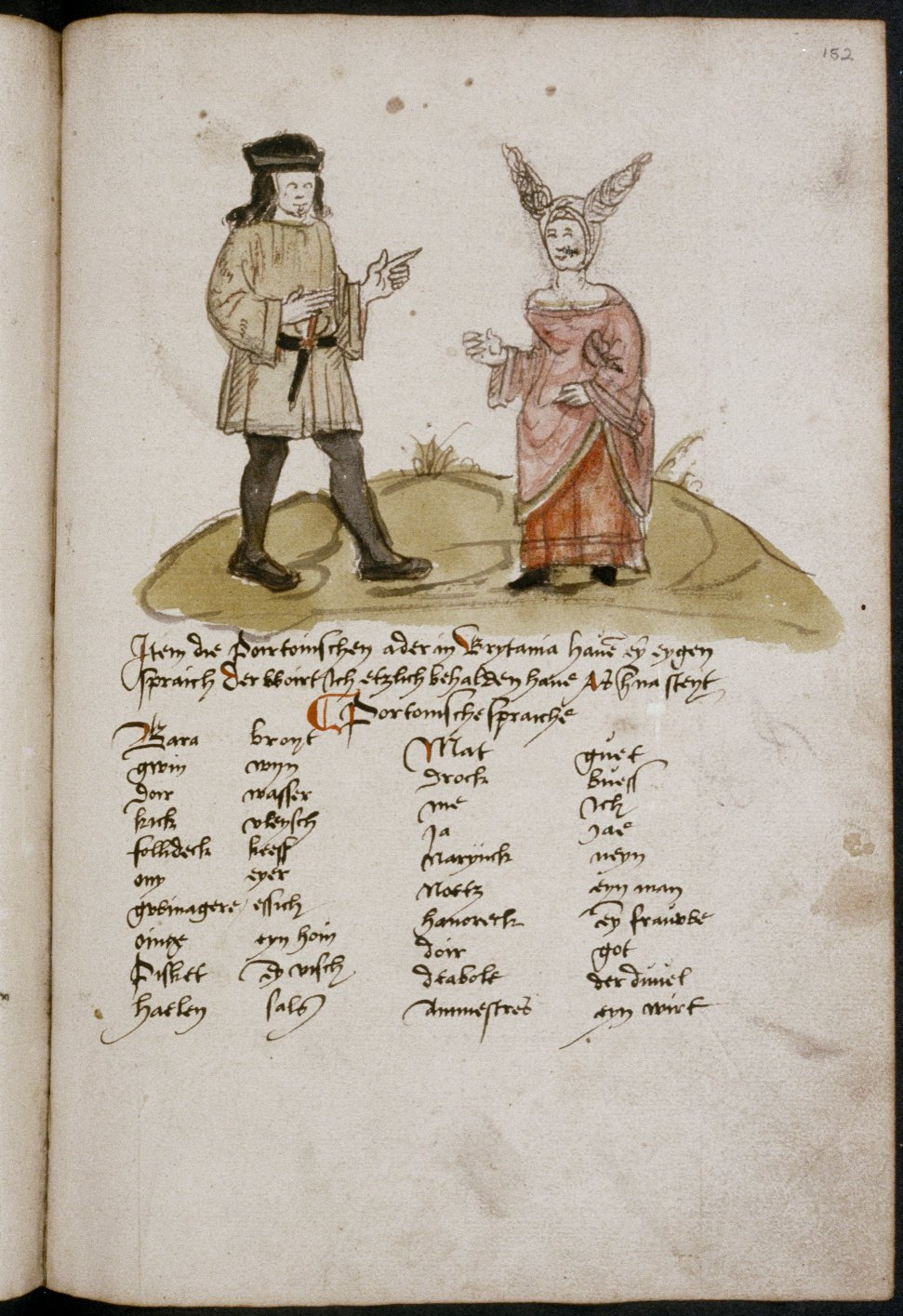
Page of Arnold von Harff's book, with the Breton-low German vocabulary with a drawing of the way Nantes people were dressed

Arnold von Harff (1471 – January 1505) was a 15th-century German traveller and writer. He made a pilgrimage that took him to the Holy Land and further afield, to present-day Yemen and Socotra, before returning overland via Antioch and Constantinople. He wrote an account of his travels which mixes first-hand experience and stories from other medieval writers like Marco Polo and Mandeville's Travels. The book, which was published in a printed edition in 1860, contains important information about the ethnology and languages of the regions he visited.

== Biography ==
Arnold von Harff was born in Schloss Harff, a castle in Bedburg in the present German state of North Rhine-Westphalia. He was the middle son of the nobleman Adam von Harff. In 1496, he went on a pilgrimage to Rome, Sinai, Jerusalem and Santiago de Compostela. His intent was to also visit Ireland and St Patrick's Purgatory, but he appears to never have reached Ireland. His journey took him from Cologne via Rome to Venice and then by ship to Alexandria. From there he travelled to and Sinai. He then continued south, reached Mecca (but was not allowed to enter) and the Aden and, possibly, Socotra.

He returned via the Nile to Cairo, and then went to the Holy Land and visited Jerusalem. By 1499, he had reached Damascus, and then continued overland via Antioch to Constantinople and the Balkans to Spain before returning to Germany. Following his return, he married Margarethe von dem Bongart in 1504 and took up office as hereditary chamberlain at the court of the Duchy of Guelders. He died in 1505.

== Writing ==
Arnold von Harff wrote an account of his travels. Manuscript copies circulated and were quite widely read by the upper class of North Rhine-Westphalia throughout the 17th century. In 1860 a printed edition was published by Everhard von Groote. Arnold von Harff wrote in a Low Rheinish dialect of German.

The style is typical for late-medieval pilgrimage writing and draws heavily upon earlier models such as Marco Polo, Mandeville's Travels and Odoric of Pordenone. Although Arnold von Harff for example claims to also have visited India and Madagascar, it is in the book quite apparent what derives from his own experience and what derives from written sources. The book contains important information about ethnology and languages, including Breton, Turkish, Basque, Hebrew, Arabic, Albanian, Hungarian, Syriac, Amharic, and Armenian.
