= Epiphanius Scholasticus =

6th-century translator of Greek works into Latin

Epiphanius Scholasticus was a sixth-century translator of Greek works into Latin.

Little is known of his life, aside from his works. It seems he bore the name Scholasticus "not so much because of any devotion to literature or theology, but in the sense that that word frequently had in the Middle Ages, meaning a chaplain, amanuensis, or general assistant of any dignitary of the church."

Epiphanius worked at the Vivarium under the direction of Cassiodorus, who described him as vir disertissimus.

Under the direction of Cassiodorus, in about 510, he compiled the Historiae Ecclesiasticae Tripartitae Epitome, or the Historia Tripartita ("Tripartite History"), a standard manual of church history through the Middle Ages. Epiphanius undertook the translations into Latin of the Greek church histories of Socrates Scholasticus, Sozomen and Theodoret, written in the previous century.

Epiphanius also translated the commentaries of Didymus on the Proverbs of Solomon and on the seven general epistles, as well as the commentaries of Epiphanius of Salamis upon Canticles. His Codex Encyclicus, compiled at the urging of Cassiodorus, collects and translates letters addressed by different synods to the Emperor Leo I in defence of the decrees of the Council of Chalcedon against the non-Chalcedonian Timotheus Aelurus. The list was drawn up in 458 by the order of Leo I, although Epiphanius made several additions to it.
