= Epiphanius the Monk =

Eastern Orthodox monk (9th century)

Epiphanius the Monk (Epiphanius Monachus, Epiphanios of Constantinople, 8th or 9th century) was a monk and priest in the Kallistratos monastery in Constantinople and author of several extant works including the life of the Virgin Mary and Andrew the Apostle (PG 120.179–286). He published the first guidebook of Jerusalem for traveling pilgrims in Greek; there is also an Old Church Slavonic translation.
