= San Miguel de Gualdape =

First European settlement in the US

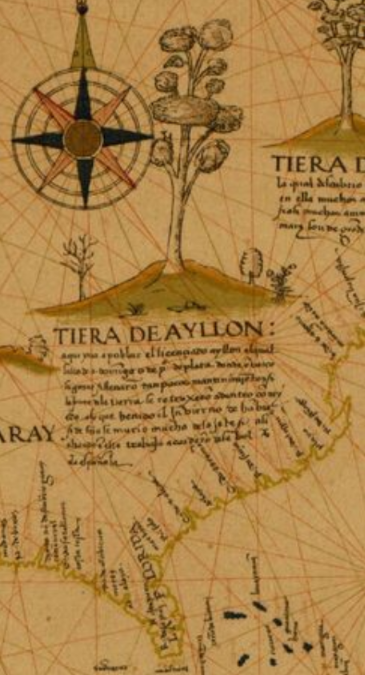
- Detail of Ribero map showing land granted to Lucas Vázquez de Ayllón on the southeast coast of North America, site of the first Spanish colony established in the present-day United States
- Country: Spanish Empire
- Established: mid 1526
- Abandoned: late 1526
- Founded by: Lucas Vázquez de Ayllón

Population
  - Total: 600

San Miguel de Gualdape (sometimes San Miguel de Guadalupe) was a short-lived Spanish colony founded in 1526 by Lucas Vázquez de Ayllón. It was established somewhere on the coast of present-day Carolinas or Georgia, but the exact location has been the subject of a long-running scholarly dispute. It was the first temporarily successful European settlement in what became the continental United States. (Note: In early 1521, Ponce de León had made a poorly documented, disastrous attempt to plant a colony near Charlotte Harbor, Florida but was quickly repulsed by the native Calusa. After the attack, the expedition returned to Havana, where Ponce soon died from his wounds. See Ponce de Leon Source Records.Douglas T. Peck (Summer 2001). "Lucas Vásquez de Ayllón's Doomed Colony of San Miguel de Gualdape". The Georgia Historical Quarterly. 85 (2): 183–198. JSTOR 40584407.)

Ayllón's expedition made their first landing at or near Winyah Bay around August 9, 1526. They quickly found the area unsuitable for settlement and relocated to the south, possibly at Sapelo Sound in Georgia, where the colony lasted just two months before it was overwhelmed by disease, hunger, a slave uprising, and a hostile Native American population. Of the 600 would-be settlers who set out, only about 150 lived to leave.

The enslaved Africans brought by the settlers became the first documented black slaves in what would become the continental United States and carried out the first slave rebellion there.

== Discovery and exploration ==
Lucas Vázquez de Ayllón was a wealthy sugar planter on Hispaniola and magistrate of a colonial royal appeals court, the Real Audiencia. In 1521, he dispatched Francisco Gordillo on an expedition to the Bahamas to kidnap people as slaves. Finding the islands completely depopulated, Gordillo and another slaving ship piloted by Pedro de Quexos sailed northwest in search of land that a previous slaving expedition had found in that direction. On June 24, 1521, they made landfall at Winyah Bay on the coast of present-day South Carolina. After some preliminary exploration of the region, they kidnapped seventy Native American Indians and brought them back to Hispanola. The authorities in Hispaniola criticized this capture, but did not send them back, because of the expense. No penalties were imposed on the captors. The captives scavenged dead animals in the town; most died, and the others were then divided among the inhabitants.

When they returned to Hispaniola, Gordillo and Quejo brought back glowing reports of the land they had found. They said it would not require military conquest and once settled the area would become a rich and prosperous colony. Ayllón was apparently inspired by these reports and soon wrote to the Spanish crown requesting permission to explore and settle the region. Later that same year, he traveled to Spain on business for the audencia but also used the opportunity to personally press his case for the new land.

Ayllón took with him one of the captured Native American Indians who had recently been baptized as Francisco de Chicora and later served as a translator for the Spanish. "Chicora" was the Spanish name for Francisco's homeland, Shakori or Waccamaw, one of several countries in the region subject to a leader Datha of Duahe. In Spain, they met the court chronicler, Peter Martyr, with whom Francisco spoke at length about his people and homeland, and about neighboring provinces. Francisco described the people of Duahe as "white" and having "blond hair to the heels", and told of a gigantic Native American Indian king called Datha, who ruled a race of giants. He also recounted the story of a former race of men who grew long tails and only ate a specific type of fish. Perhaps most interesting to the Spanish, he assured his audience that pearls and other valuable gems could be found in the region.

On June 12, 1523, Ayllón obtained a cédula, or royal patent, from Charles V and the Council of the Indies allowing him to establish a settlement on the eastern seaboard and conduct trade with the local natives. He would be governor for life and the title alguacil mayor (high sheriff) would be held by him and his heirs forever. In return for these and numerous other privileges, Ayllón was required to perform a more detailed exploration of the region, establish missions, churches, and a Franciscan monastery to further conversion of the native population, and he was restrained from implementing an encomienda or other means of forcing Indian labor.

As required by his contract, Ayllón hired Quejo to lead an exploratory voyage consisting of two caravels and about sixty crewmen. They set sail in early April, 1525 with instructions to explore 200 leagues (640 nautical miles) of coastline, record necessary bearings and soundings, erect stone markers bearing the name of Charles V, and obtain Native American Indians who might serve as guides and interpreters for future voyages. They made their first landfall on May 3, 1525, likely at the Savannah River. From there, they continued north until reaching Winyah Bay, the site of their original landing in 1521. It is not clear how much further north Quejo traveled, possibly as far as Chesapeake Bay, but he observed that the coast beyond Winyah Bay was mostly sand dunes and pine scrub. The expedition returned home in July, 1525.

== Settlement and failure ==
Quejo's return marked the beginning of active preparation for a voyage of settlement led by Ayllón himself. He spent his own considerable fortune and even put himself into debt to outfit the expedition. A fleet consisting of six vessels carrying about 600-700 passengers and crew was assembled. Some women, children and enslaved Africans were included among the settlers. Two Dominican friars, Antonio de Montesinos and Antonio de Cervantes were brought along to minister to both the settlers and the natives. Montesinos was well known in Hispanola for his outspoken opposition to enslavement and mistreatment of the Native American Indians. Supplies and livestock, including cows, sheep, pigs, and a hundred horses, were loaded and the fleet departed in mid-July, 1526.

The large colonizing group landed in Winyah Bay on August 9, 1526, and encountered their first significant setback when their flagship, the Capitana, struck a sandbar and sank. There was no loss of life but a large portion of their supplies was lost. In addition, Francisco de Chicora and the other Native American Indians brought along as interpreters and guides, deserted the fleet in the first few days and escaped into the woods. Ayllón ordered a replacement vessel, La Gavarra, to be built, probably the earliest example of European-style boat building in what is now the United States.

They looked for a suitable site to establish a settlement at nearby Pawleys Island but the soil was poor and a sparse Native American Indian population offered little chance for profitable trade. Several reconnaissance parties were sent out in a wide search for better opportunities. Based on their reports, Ayllón decided to move about 200 miles south to a "powerful river", probably the Sapelo Sound in present-day Georgia. Early in September, the able-bodied men rode to the new site on horseback while the rest traveled by ship. When they reached Sapelo Sound, they began immediately to construct houses and a church to form a rough settlement.

On September 29, 1526, the settlement was christened San Miguel de Gualdape in observance of the feast of St. Michael the Archangel. Gualdape was likely a reference to the local Guale tribe, a chiefdom that was part of the Mississippian culture. The colony's situation, already hampered by a late start and the loss of their flagship, quickly became worse. The settlers suffered from hunger, cold, disease and hostile natives. It was too late in the season to plant crops and game was scarce. The surrounding waters were teeming with fish but the settlers were too sick or otherwise unwilling to catch fish. The shallow water table and porous soil would have made it easy to contaminate their wells with human and animal waste. Disease was rampant, especially dysentery or other water-borne illnesses. Ayllón had hoped to supplement their food stores by trading with the Indians; however, the natives were unable or unwilling to provide assistance. On top of everything else, the weather turned unseasonably cold, increasing the settlers misery and discontent.

The death toll climbed quickly and on October 18, 1526, Ayllón himself died. Captain Francisco Gómez became leader of the colony; he and the other council members wanted to stay and wait for re-supply from Hispanola. Another faction, led by Gines Doncel and his lieutenant, Pedro de Bazan, pushed for withdrawal. Within a week of Ayllón's death, Doncel and a group of armed supporters arrested Gómez and the other leaders and locked them in Doncel's house. At the same time, another group of settlers forced themselves on a local Native American Indian village demanding food and other assistance. The village resisted and the settlers were killed. This incident marked a turning point for the local Native American Indians and incited further hostilities against the Spaniards.

Doncel was determined to eliminate those who still opposed him. One night, he and Bazan set out to ambush and kill two of their most vocal opponents. For reasons that are unclear, some of the enslaved Africans set fire to Doncel's house that same night. In the ensuing confusion, Gómez and the other city leaders were freed, Bazan was fatally wounded and Doncel and the other mutineers were arrested. By then, the surviving colonists agreed it was time to evacuate the colony and return to Hispanola. By the end of October they were boarding their ships and by mid-November all the settlers had left San Miguel de Gualdape.

Bad weather and a shortage of food and water made the voyage home extremely difficult. The ships became separated and sailing time varied from weeks to months. Several passengers froze to death and one ship experienced an incident of cannibalism. Of the 600 people who started the expedition in July, only about 150 returned home alive.

=== Location ===
Sixteenth-century sources provide only vague and sometimes contradictory information regarding the location of San Miguel de Gualdape. As a result, the sites of Ayllón's initial landing and eventual settlement have been the subject of a long-running scholarly dispute.

In the early 19th century, historian Martín Fernández de Navarrete said the expedition first landed at 33°40' and then proceeded north to establish their settlement on a river near Cape Lookout. Other historians followed his lead and said Ayllón travelled north after the initial landing; in 1861 Johann Kohl placed Gualdape on the Cape Fear River; and in 1886, John Gilmary Shea cited the 17th-century Spanish explorer Francisco Fernández de Écija who reported that Ayllón travelled north and settled at the future site of the English colony, Jamestown.

In the 1850s, the complete text of Historia general by Gonzalo Fernández de Oviedo was first published, providing important clues about the location of Gualdape. Oviedo wrote that the expedition traveled southwest for about 45 leagues where they established their colony on a great river.

In the 20th century, scholars tended to accept the southwesterly direction of travel recorded by Oviedo. In 1901, Woodbury Lowery wrote that the initial landing took place near Cape Fear River and then proceeded south to establish the colony on the Pee Dee River. John Swanton said Ayllon first landed at Santee River and then traveled south to establish Gualdape on the Savannah River. In 1956, Paul Quattlebaum put the first landing at Cape Fear River and the settlement at Winyah Bay.

In 1990, historian Paul E. Hoffman wrote that Ayllon first landed at the Santee River and afterwards established San Miguel de Gualdape at Sapelo Sound in present-day Georgia. He based his estimate in part on a handbook of sailing directions compiled by cosmographer Alonso de Chavez between 1533 and 1537. David J. Weber agrees with this assessment, saying that Hoffman has been able to identify these sites "more satisfactorily than any other historian has done to date." However, writing in 2001, Douglas T. Peck asserted that the colony was established at the Savannah River, a better match with the description of a "great river" and in any case, a significant barrier that the overland portion of the expedition could not have crossed.

Archaeological attempts to locate the site of the colony have been unsuccessful.

== Legacy ==
After the failure at San Miguel de Gualdape, the Spaniards concluded that Ayllón had not prepared properly for the colder weather or the more aggressive Indian population. Many felt that the region still held promise but future success would require military leadership and support. The next attempt to explore the region was led by Hernando de Soto and his expedition reflected the belief that a more militaristic approach was needed.

=== Slavery and rebellion ===
Included among the 600 settlers accompanying Ayllon was an unknown number of enslaved Africans. Gonzalo Fernández de Oviedo y Valdés, a contemporary chronicler of the expedition, says only that "some" enslaved Black people were brought along. Historian Paul Hoffman thinks that they were probably household servants or craftsmen and not field hands. In October, a group of the enslaved people in the settlement set fire to the home of Gines Doncel, the leader of a mutiny against the colony's leadership. No details are known; Oviedo remarks simply that the enslaved "had their reasons" for this action. In the ensuing confusion, Doncel and his fellow-mutineers were arrested. There is no indication of what happened to the arsonists. It has been stated that they escaped to live with Native Americans, but there is no contemporary account saying that enslaved Africans escaped. This episode, in which enslaved people supported the established government against the mutineers, is regarded as the first slave rebellion in mainland North America.

=== First Catholic mass ===
Dominican friars Fr. Antonio de Montesinos and Fr. Anthony de Cervantes were among the colonists at San Miguel de Gualdape. They would have celebrated Mass each day, making this the first place in the present-day United States (Note: Meaning any of the 50 states of the US, but not including all US territories and possessions, as Catholicism was already widely practiced in Puerto Rico by this time.) in which Mass was celebrated. The specific location and date of the event are not known.

== See also ==
- Mission Nombre de Dios
- La Antigua, Veracruz
- L'Anse aux Meadows
- Spanish Florida
