= Chicora (disambiguation) =

Chicora was a legendary Native American kingdom or tribe said to exist in present-day South Carolina.

Chicora may also refer to:

- Chicora, Pennsylvania, a borough in Butler County, Pennsylvania, USA
- Chicora, Michigan, an unincorporated community in Cheshire Township, Allegan County, Michigan, USA
- CSS Chicora, a Confederate naval vessel that fought in the American Civil War
- Chicora Wood Plantation, NRHP in Georgetown, South Carolina
- Francisco de Chicora, a native from present-day South Carolina kidnapped by Spanish explorers in 1521
- Chicora incident, an incident between the United States and a British/Canadian expeditionary force in 1870
