= Lucas Vázquez de Ayllón =

Spanish magistrate and explorer

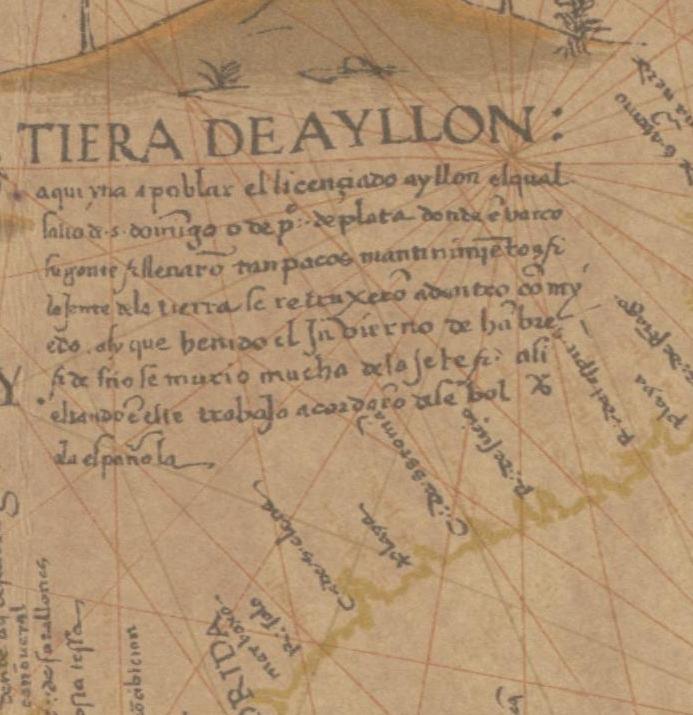
- Map detail by Diego Ribero (1529), showing southeastern coast of current US was named Tiera de Ayllon
- Born: c. 1480; Toledo, Kingdom of Toledo, Crown of Castile, Spanish Empire
- Died: 18 October 1526 (aged 45–46); San Miguel de Gualdape, Spanish Empire
- Occupations: Magistrate; explorer; colonizer

Lucas Vázquez de Ayllón (Note: Spanish pronunciation: [ˈlukas ˈβaθkeθ ðe ajˈʎon].) (c. 1480 – 18 October 1526) was a Spanish magistrate and explorer who in 1526 established the short-lived San Miguel de Gualdape colony, one of the first European attempts at a settlement in what is now the United States. Ayllón's account of the region inspired a number of later attempts by the Spanish and French governments to colonize the southeastern United States.

== Early life and education ==
Ayllón was born in Toledo around 1480, the younger son of a prominent family whose roots traced back to a high-ranking mozarab judge in Islamic Spain. His parents were city councilman Juan Vázquez de Ayllón and Inés de Villalobos. Ayllón received a good education in law and his father's position gave him valuable insights into the practice of politics.

== In Hispaniola ==
In 1502, the Spanish Monarchs sent Nicolás de Ovando to serve as governor of Hispaniola in the Indies. Ayllón accompanied Ovando's flotilla and arrived at the capital, Santo Domingo, in April 1502. In 1504, Ayllón was appointed alcalde mayor, the chief magistrate and administrative officer, of Concepción. Ayllón was expected to establish order in the turbulent gold-mining districts in the hinterlands of the island.

In 1509, Ovando and his lieutenants, including Ayllón, were recalled to Spain and subjected to a residencia, a review or audit of their term in office. Ayllón faced charges that he enriched himself unjustly but apparently was able to defend himself successfully with no harm to his career or his wealth. After his return to Spain he undertook additional studies in law and earned the equivalent of a master's degree from the University of Salamanca.

Meanwhile, Ferdinand was concerned by his lack of control in the Indies and the growing influence of the new governor, Diego Colón. In 1511 Ferdinand established a royal appeals court, the Real Audiencia in Hispaniola. The king demonstrated considerable faith in Ayllón when he appointed him as one of three judges of this court, intended to assert royal power in the colonies. Ayllón reached Hispaniola in May 1512 and quickly became an influential figure in the politics of the island.

Around 1514, Ayllón married Ana de Bezerra, daughter of a wealthy miner, thus gaining wealth and prestige to add to his political power. He also acquired a sugar plantation and funded various slave-trading ventures. Some colonists complained that Ayllón and the other judges were unfairly dominating the slave-market and driving up the price of slaves.

When Ferdinand died in 1516, Cardinal Francisco Jiménez de Cisneros became regent for the young King Charles V. Cisneros was determined to end the abuse of the Indians. He had Ayllón and the other judges of the audencia suspended in 1517 and investigated for alleged abuses. However, when Cisneros was removed from the regency, the residencia was cut short, and the judges were restored to office in 1520.

== Narváez expedition ==
Even during his suspension, Ayllón remained an influential figure in the Indies. In 1519, after Hernán Cortés began his conquest of Mexico, Cortés declared his independence from Diego Velázquez de Cuéllar, the governor of Cuba and sponsor of the expedition. Fearful that the dispute between Cortés and Velázquez would escalate into open warfare, Crown authorities sent Ayllón first to Cuba to confer with Velázquez and then to Mexico in Pánfilo de Narváez's expedition in an attempt to convince both sides to settle their differences in court. When Ayllón reached Mexico, he was forcibly detained by Narváez and sent back to Santo Domingo with nothing to show for his efforts.

== Exploration ==
After Ayllón's reinstatement to the audiencia, a ship arrived at Santo Domingo sometime around August 1521. The pilot, Francisco Gordillo, had been hired by Ayllón to lead a slaving expedition to the Bahamas. Finding the islands completely depopulated, Gordillo and Pedro de Quexos, pilot of another slaving ship, sailed northwest in search of land rumored to be found in that direction. On June 24, 1521, they made landfall at Winyah Bay on the coast of present-day South Carolina. After some preliminary exploration of the region, they kidnapped sixty Indians and took them back to Hispaniola.

In addition to the Indian slaves, Gordillo and Quexos brought back glowing reports of the land they had found. They said it would not require military conquest and once settled the area would become a rich and prosperous colony. Ayllón was apparently inspired by these reports and soon wrote to the Spanish crown requesting permission to explore and settle the region. Later that same year he traveled to Spain on business for the audencia but used the opportunity to personally press his case for the new land. Ayllón took with him one of the captured Indians, who had recently been baptized as Francisco de Chicora. In Spain they met the court chronicler, Peter Martyr, with whom Chicora spoke at length about his people and homeland, and about neighboring provinces.

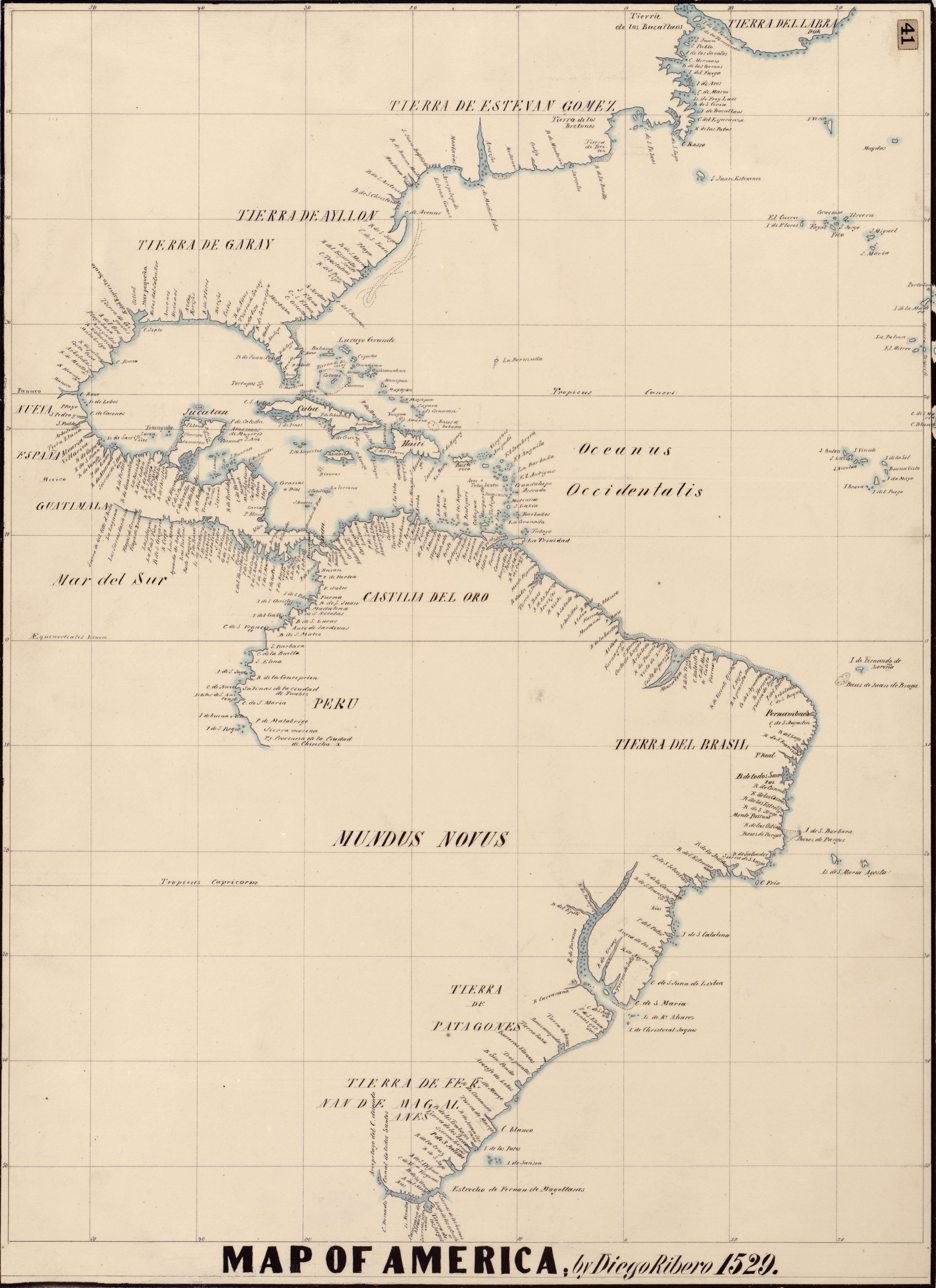
Detail of the American Coast Map by Diego Ribero (1529), where the southern half of the east coast of the current US is named as Tierra de Ayllon

Ayllón signed a contract with the crown on June 12, 1523, allowing him to establish a settlement on the eastern seaboard and conduct trade with the local natives. He was appointed as governor for life and the title alguacil mayor (high sheriff) would be held by him and his heirs forever. In return for these and numerous other privileges, Ayllón was required to perform a more detailed exploration of the region, establish missions, churches, and a Franciscan monastery to support conversion of the native population. He was restrained from implementing an encomienda or other means of forcing Indian labor. While still in Spain, Ayllón was also named a comendador in the military order of Santiago.

Before returning to Hispaniola, Ayllón was ordered to Puerto Rico. There he was required to complete a number of pending investigations and audits of current and former government officials. From the Crown's viewpoint, his efforts were successful in bringing some order to the government on the island and helped put an end to Diego Colón's independent authority in the islands.

After an absence of three years, Ayllón returned to Santo Domingo around December 1524 and, per his contract, began organizing an expedition to explore the southeastern coast of North America. He hired Quexos to lead a voyage consisting of two caravels and about sixty crewmen. They set sail in early April 1525, with instructions to explore 200 leagues (640 nautical miles) of coastline, record necessary bearings and soundings, erect stone markers bearing the name of Charles V, and obtain Indians who might serve as guides and interpreters for future voyages. They made their first landfall on May 3, 1525, likely at the Savannah River. From there they continued north until reaching Winyah Bay, the site of their original landing in 1521. It is not clear how much further north Quexos traveled, perhaps as far as Chesapeake Bay. He reported that the coast beyond Winyah Bay was mostly sand dunes and pine scrub. The expedition returned to Santo Domingo in July 1525.

== Establishment of San Miguel de Gualdape and death ==
After Quexos' return, Ayllón began preparation for a voyage of settlement that he would lead personally. He spent his considerable fortune and incurred debt to outfit the expedition. He assembled a fleet of six vessels carrying about 600-700 passengers and crew. Some women, children and black enslaved people were included among the settlers. Supplies and livestock, including cows, sheep, pigs and a hundred horses, were loaded and the fleet departed in mid-July 1526. The large colonizing group landed in Winyah Bay on August 9, 1526. Their largest ship struck a sandbar and sank. There was no loss of life but a major portion of their supplies was lost. Ayllón ordered a replacement vessel to be built, probably the earliest example of European-style boat building in what is now the United States.

Ayllón looked for a suitable site to establish a settlement at nearby Pawleys Island, but the soil was poor and a sparse Indian population offered little chance for profitable trade. Several reconnaissance parties were sent out to search for better opportunities. Based on their reports, Ayllón decided to move about 200 miles south to a "powerful river", probably Sapelo Sound in present-day Georgia. Early in September, the healthy men rode to the new site on horseback while the rest traveled by ship. When they reached Sapelo Sound, they began immediately to construct houses and a church.

The short-lived colony of San Miguel de Gualdape was formally established on the festival of Saint Michael, September 29, 1526. While it was established after a 1521 colonization attempt in southern Florida by Ponce de León, it is generally considered the first European settlement in the present-day United States, since the earlier attempt was abandoned almost immediately. Ayllón's rough-hewn town survived less than three months, with settlers enduring exhaustion, cold, hunger, disease, and troubles with the local natives. When Ayllón died on October 18, 1526, from an unnamed illness, the entire enterprise fell apart. The surviving colonists broke into warring factions and by mid-November decided to give up and sail back to Hispaniola. Of the 600-700 people whom Ayllón had brought with him, only 150 survivors reached Hispaniola that winter.

San Miguel de Gualdape was the first European colony in what is now the United States, preceding the unsuccessful colony at Pensacola, Florida, by 33 years, St. Augustine, Florida (the first successful colony) by 39 years, the Roanoke Colony by 61 years, and Jamestown, Virginia, by 81 years. Despite repeated attempts, archaeologists have been unable to locate the site of the town or the shipwreck in Winyah Bay.

== Legacy ==
Peter Martyr's Decades of the New World (1530) and especially Francisco Lopez de Gomara's Historia general de las Indias (1552) helped spread the story of Ayllón's new Andalusia into European lore about exploration. His explorations also contributed to Alonso de Chaves's Espejo de Navegantes (c. 1539), Giovanni Vespucci's 1526 map and other future Spanish maps.

== See also ==
- Hernando de Soto
- Tristán de Luna

== Sources ==
- Chisholm, Hugh, ed. (1911). "Ayllon, Lucas Vasquez de" . Encyclopædia Britannica. Vol. 3 (11th ed.). Cambridge University Press. p. 73.
- Herbermann, Charles, ed. (1913). "Lucas Vásquez de Ayllón" . Catholic Encyclopedia. New York: Robert Appleton Company.
- Hoffman, Paul E. (2007). "Ayllón, Lucas Vázquez de". In Buiisseret, David (ed.). The Oxford Companion to World Exploration. Oxford University Press. p. 80. ISBN 978-0-19-514922-7.
- Wilson, J. G.; Fiske, J., eds. (1900). "Ayllón, Lucas Vázquez de" . Appletons' Cyclopædia of American Biography. New York: D. Appleton.
