= Peter Martyr's mission to Egypt =

Spanish diplomatic trip, 1501–1502

In 1501–1502, Peter Martyr d'Anghiera, an Italian humanist, was sent on a diplomatic mission to Mamluk Egypt by Isabella I of Castile and Ferdinand II of Aragon, in order to convince Sultan Qansuh al-Ghuri not to retaliate against his Christian subjects in response to the fall of Granada to the Spanish and the subsequent persecution of Moors.

Martyr was instructed by the Catholic Monarchs to deny reports of forced conversions of their Spanish Muslim subjects. He began his voyage in August 1501, reaching Venice in October. The ambassador later sailed for Alexandria and reached the port city on December 23. He toured Alexandria after being initially denied an audience with the Sultan. When the approval finally came, he traveled to Cairo and met with al-Ghuri on February 6, 1502. The Sultan received Martyr well in his Cairo palace, amid local unrest fueled by envoys from other Muslim states. Another secret meeting was arranged, during which Martyr was inquired about the forced conversions. He told the Sultan that the Granadan Moors had chosen the Catholic faith by their own will and blamed the tension on Jews. Martyr promised Spanish naval assistance to al-Ghuri should war break out with the Ottoman Empire. The ambassador's arguments appeared to have convinced the Sultan, who assured Martyr that Christians would be protected and allowed the renovation of their places of worship in the Holy Land. Martyr visited a number of ancient sites in and around Cairo, including the pyramids of Giza. He was given a farewell ceremony on February 21 and sailed back to Venice on April 22.

The mission was an overall success. Martyr wrote about the events in his Legatio Babylonica, one of the earliest Western European accounts of Egypt, in which he also recorded his sightseeing in the country.

== Background ==
Peter Martyr, generally believed to have been born in 1457 in the town of Arona, was a well-connected Italian humanist who was educated in Milan, and who came under the protection of powerful lords throughout his life in Italy. After moving from Lombardy to Rome, in 1477, he managed to penetrate Papal and academic circles, including the infamous Accademia Romana. In 1484, he became the secretary of Francesco Negro, Rome's governor under Pope Innocent VIII. In 1486, he met Íñigo López de Mendoza, Conde of Tendilla, who was on a diplomatic mission to Rome on behalf of the Catholic Monarchs. Martyr and Mendoza became friends, and the latter persuaded him to return with him to Spain, which he agreed to.

By the time Martyr arrived in Spain, in 1487, the country was involved in the Granada War. (Note: Martyr's desire to take part in the war against the Granadan Moors may have significantly contributed to his decision to relocate to Spain.) Having settled there, he came under the protection of Queen Isabella I of Castile and may have been assigned the task of tutoring the young nobles of her court. In 1489, Martyr became involved in the Spanish campaign against the Moors, during which he divided his time between the battlefield, as a soldier, and Isabella's court, as a war historian. (Note: His descriptions of the sieges and battles of this campaign was published in a collection of his letters known as the Opus epistolarum.) He accompanied the troops of King Ferdinand II of Aragon, participating in the siege of Baza and witnessing the eventual capitulation of Nasrid Granada and completion of the Reconquista in 1492. He later occupied a canonical post in the newly reconquered city, and in 1493 he began writing about the discoveries of Christopher Columbus upon the latter's first return from the New World.

=== Spanish and Nasrid diplomacy in the eastern Mediterranean ===
Throughout the Reconquista, rulers of al-Andalus would traditionally send emissaries with distress calls to powerful Muslim states in the region, often to western Islamic kingdoms like those of the Maghreb. Internal division among the Maghrebis, however, tended to limit the extent of their assistance to the Moors during the final decades of Muslim Spain. The first time Mamluk Egypt received a Nasrid request for aid was through four Granadan ambassadors who arrived in Egypt around December 1440. Sayf ad-Din Jaqmaq, the Mamluk Sultan, told the embassy that he would refer their request to the Ottomans and that he could not provide the required military assistance. Following pressure by the emissaries, the sultan eventually promised them financial aid. Nasrid diplomatic engagements with other Muslim states increased over the years. Their letters and appeals were sent to Morocco, Egypt and even to Constantinople. During the 1480s, senior Aragonese officials, including King Ferdinand himself, grew increasingly suspicious of the intentions of the Mudéjars, their Muslim subjects who had a more favorable status in the Crown of Aragon than they did in neighboring Castile. The king ordered in 1480 an investigation into alleged Mudéjar activity in the Mamluk state and their attempt to pressure its sultan to persecute his Christian subjects. The Catholic Monarchs were, since 1484, heavily investing in the revival of Barcelona's ailing economy, which highly depended on trade. This initiative came to involve the 1485 restoration of a Catalan consulate in the port city of Alexandria, which the Aragonese considered a vital component in their Mediterranean trade network. Well-established commercial ties also existed between Egypt and the Granadan cities and, according to the Mamluk chronicler Muhammad ibn Iyas, the Egyptian public was being regularly updated on the many developments affecting their co-religionists in Iberia, including the infighting among Nasrid leaders. Despite reluctance by the Mamluks to assist them militarily, the Moors continued to perceive the Egyptian sultanate as one of the few powerful Muslim states in the Mediterranean capable of intervening on Granada's behalf when the latter could no longer resist the Christian armies. What posed a bigger threat to Ferdinand, however, were the recent Ottoman advances in the Mediterranean, particularly in Otranto, which lied close to Italian possessions of the Crown of Aragon.

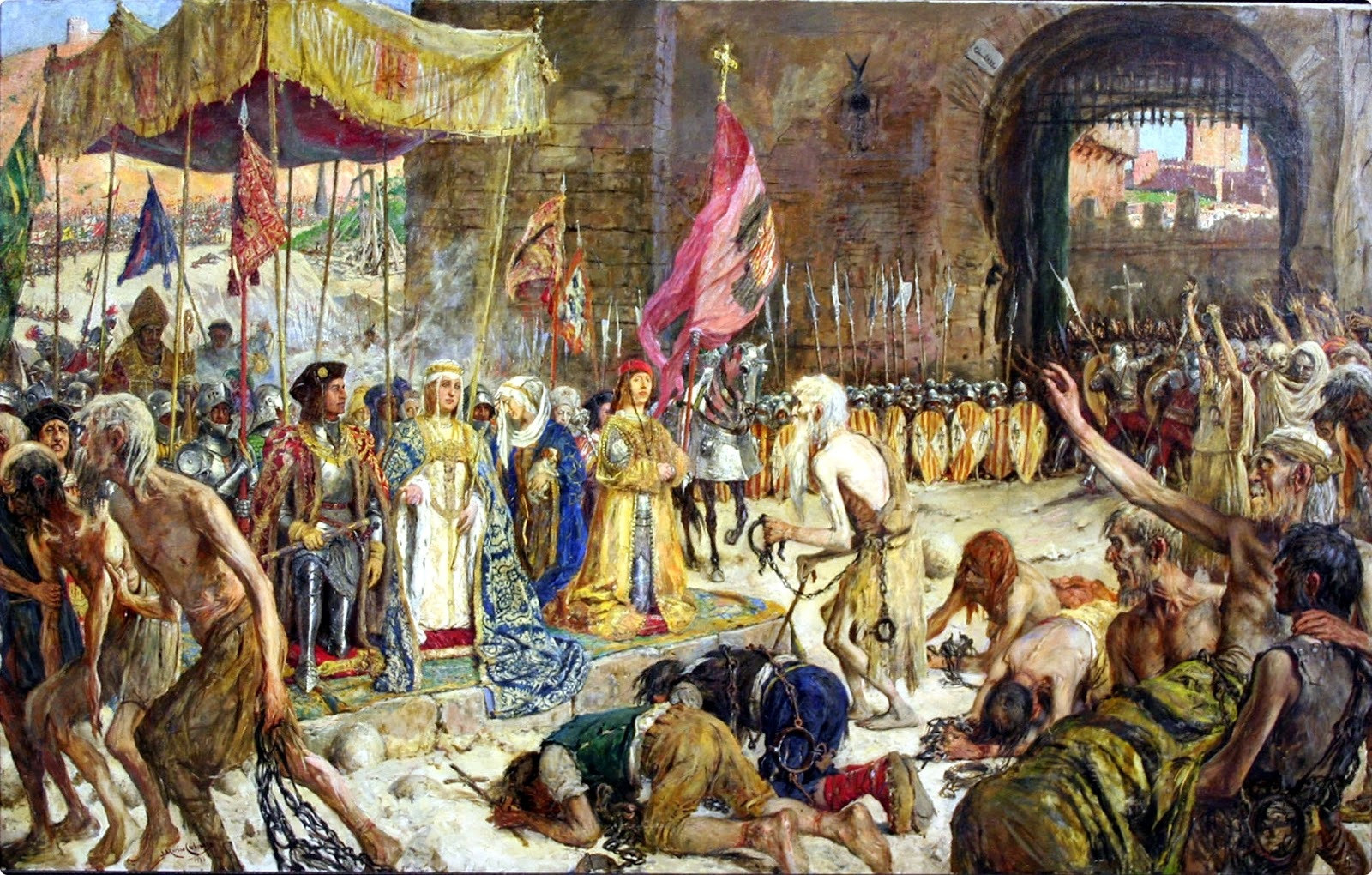
Liberación de los cautivos de Málaga por los Reyes Católicos (1930), by José Moreno Carbonero, depicting the aftermath of the capitulation of Málaga to the Catholic Monarchs.

Ferdinand's fears were further aggravated by reports of an alliance between his generally well-armed Mudéjar subjects and the Ottoman Turks, allegedly being formed to assist the Granadans. In 1486–87, another wave of Nasrid embassies was sent to Cairo and Constantinople. (Note: In L'Espagne musulmane au temps des Nasrides, Rachel Arié opines that the Nasrid diplomatic initiative was launched in 1487, while Mark D. Meyerson, in The Muslims of Valencia in the Age of Fernando and Isabel, believes that there is a possibility that it took place earlier, in 1486. Both years correspond with the year 892 AH in the Islamic calendar. If the embassy to the Ottoman court arrived in 1486 and if the Ottoman and Mamluk missions were related, both of which are likely, then it was probably el-Zagal who dispatched the embassies in 1486, not his nephew Boabdil who took over the Granadan throne in April 1487.) Bayezid II, the Ottoman sultan, reacted to the Granadan appeals later on, in 1490, by dispatching a corsair fleet led by Kemal Reis that based itself in different locations along the Barbary coast to make contact with the Moors and to harass Christian shipping. (Note: Distracted by the war with the Mamluks and unwilling to antagonize Christian Europe so openly at the time, Bayezid was initially hesitant to assist Granada. It was an embassy by the Hafsids of Tunis to Bayezid's court that eventually convinced the latter to send Kemal Reis to the western Mediterranean.) On the other hand, Qaitbay, the sultan of Egypt, was reluctant to comply with the Nasrids' request that involved sending an army detachment to assist their cause, possibly in fear that this might compromise Mamluk military readiness in the face of an impending Ottoman incursion from the north. Qaitbay had even accepted Ferdinand's assistance during the Ottoman-Mamluk war, despite the Christians' campaigning in Granada. So instead of providing military assistance to the Moors, as requested by the Nasrid embassy, Qaitbay warned the Catholic Monarchs that Eastern Christians could face persecution in Jerusalem if the Granada campaign did not stop. This short-lived cooperation between the Spanish and the Mamluks lasted from 1488 to 1491, during which Ferdinand supplied the Egyptian state with wheat in order to finance the Granada War and later offered to assist the Mamluks on the naval front with fifty Spanish caravels. It came to an end when Qaitbay allied with the Ottomans at the conclusion of their war. Under Ferdinand, the Crown of Aragon had been observing a policy that involved maintaining diplomatic channels with the Islamic east so as to establish itself as protector of Christianity in the Holy Land. In his response to Qaitbay's threat, in 1489, Ferdinand justified the war on the grounds that he was merely reclaiming land that was originally Spain's, explaining that the Spanish motives were political rather than religious. He also assured the Sultan that Aragon never challenged the right of its Mudéjars to freely practice their Muslim faith during his war with Granada, (Note: A diplomatic exchange similar to this one and to Peter Martyr's mission took place in 1304, when an Aragonese embassy also traveled to Mamluk Egypt and reminded its Sultan that Spanish Muslims could face retribution if Coptic places of worship were harassed.) which was in contrast to Castile's reputation in the Islamic world for mistreating its conquered Muslim subjects throughout the centuries-long Reconquista.

=== Prelude to the embassy ===
Qaitbay's death in 1496 was followed by a violent interregnum. This coincided with other developments in the region and beyond, including the discovery of gold in the New World, and Portugal's penetration into the Indian Ocean, placing it on collision course with Mamluk Egypt. And with the onset of the Italian Wars, Spain's interest in Egypt and the eastern Mediterranean began to decline, with the focus shifting towards strengthening its positions in the western Mediterranean to be able to challenge the French presence in Italy. The civil war in Egypt concluded with the ascent to power of Sultan Qansuh al-Ghuri, who now ruled over a weakened state that was under constant threat of invasion by its militarily superior Ottoman rival. By this time, the Catholic Monarchs had used a Muslim uprising in the Alpujarras as an argument against the treaty that guaranteed the Moors' right to freedom of worship. The Mamluk Sultanate, while desiring to maintain friendly ties with the Spanish, also wished to prevent the Ottoman Empire from taking over its status as a center of Islam, since Cairo was the ceremonial seat of the Abbasid Caliphate. The Catholic Monarchs have been receiving information that the Sultan was threatening retaliatory measures against Christian communities and pilgrims in the Levant. Ferdinand tended to play down such threats, even when one such threat by the Mamluk Sultan was referred to him by the Pope. But they started taking the matter much more seriously following the 1501 suppression of the Alpujarras rebellion, after which the news of forced conversions of Muslims and Granadan appeals for help had spread to the rest of the Islamic world. This may be due to the influence that Egyptian-based Granadans had in the Sultan's court, notably Ibn al-Azraq, who was received by Qaitbay some years earlier, and probably even Jewish refugees.

One of the Moorish appeals that may have eventually led to the Spanish counter-embassy came in the form of a long and emotional qasida by an anonymous Granadan poet that made it to the Egyptian court in 1501, (Note: It was a shorter version of another qasida that was later sent to the Ottoman court, probably due to insufficient action by the Mamluks, according to scholar Leonard Patrick Harvey.) describing different forms of persecution in Spain targeting Muslims of all ages. Isabella and Ferdinand, for unknown reasons, chose Martyr as their envoy to Egypt. His mission was to deter the Sultan from possible retaliation, so the Catholic Monarchs instructed him to deny the forced conversions should the Sultan bring up the subject and to further explain that "no [conversion] was done by force and never will be, because our holy faith desires this not be done to anyone." Martyr was also tasked with delivering a message to the Doge of Venice on his way to Egypt.

== Voyage to Alexandria ==
In late August 1501, a month after the issuing of an edict banning Islam in Granada, Martyr left Spain. He traveled through France, passing by Narbonne and Avignon, and reached Venice on October 1, days after the death of its Doge, Agostino Barbarigo, with no elected successor as of yet. (Note: Marino Sanuto the Younger, a contemporary Venetian chronicler, mentioned Martyr's arrival in the city in his Diarii.) He delivered his message to the Senate on October 6, and on October 10 he reported back to the Catholic Monarchs in the first of three letters that would make up his Legatio Babylonica. In it, Martyr described how he was impressed by his stay in the Venetian Lagoon, and gave account of the republic's shipbuilding industry and its governing system. He also visited Venice's churches, palaces and libraries.

From looking at its ruins, I would say that Alexandria once had 100,000 houses or more. Now it barely has 4,000. Instead of being inhabited by people they are nests for doves and pigeons. (Note: Possibly as a result of an epidemic that had recently affected Alexandria, severely decimating its population.)

— Martyr, in a letter to his friend, Pedro Fajardo.

Martyr left the lagoon for the port city of Pula, from which he embarked for his intended destination aboard a three-masted galeazza, part of a larger Venetian merchant fleet that regularly traveled to the Levant and Egypt. He reached Alexandria on December 23, after a voyage marred by stormy weather and a near collision with rocky formations off the city's coast, which Martyr believed to have constituted the foundation of the ancient Lighthouse of Alexandria. There, he stayed at the residence of the city's Catalan-born French consul, Felipe de Paredes. (Note: Spanish affairs in the region were handled at the time by France, one of the two European powers protecting Christian trade interests in the Levant. The other protector was Venice.) Awaiting permission to visit the Sultan and safe passage for his trip to the capital, he toured Alexandria. While he admired its port, Martyr also expressed disappointment in the city's current state of affairs, as compared to its period of success as the capital of the ancient Ptolemaic Kingdom.

His trip to Cairo, which he called "Babylon", was delayed by the Sultan's refusal to meet with him. Martyr blamed this on what he perceived to be the influence of Jews who were expelled from Spain. He finished his second letter on January 24. Martyr told the Spanish monarchs in his Legatio that they had a reputation in Egypt of being "violent and perjuring tyrants" because of the effect "Jewish and Moorish heretics" had on the Sultan. He dispatched two Franciscan friars to Cairo, with a message to the Sultan in which Jews were referred to as "enemies of peace and goodwill between sovereigns." (Note: Francis Augustus MacNutt, who translated Martyr's work in 1912, wrote that the Mamluk ruler, while generally tolerant, was "fettered by the fanaticism of his courtiers and the Mussulman clergy." He also explained that Martyr's Christian embassy in a Muslim country came at a bad time, as not only were the reports of persecution in Spain widespread in the Islamic world, but the recent Portuguese threat to Egyptian shipping in the Indian Ocean further complicated the matter.) He was eventually allowed an audience with the Sultan.

== In Cairo ==
On January 26, 1502, he left from Rosetta, travelling up the Nile by boat to Cairo. He landed in Bulaq at night, and was greeted the following morning by Tangriberdy, a Spanish renegade who served as Grand Dragoman to al-Ghuri. Tangriberdy told Martyr that he had been captured years back after his ship sank near the Egyptian coast and was forced to give up his faith to avoid getting killed. They went on to organize the formalities which Martyr was to observe during his reception by the Sultan, scheduled to take place the next day. Martyr spent that night at the dragoman's palace.

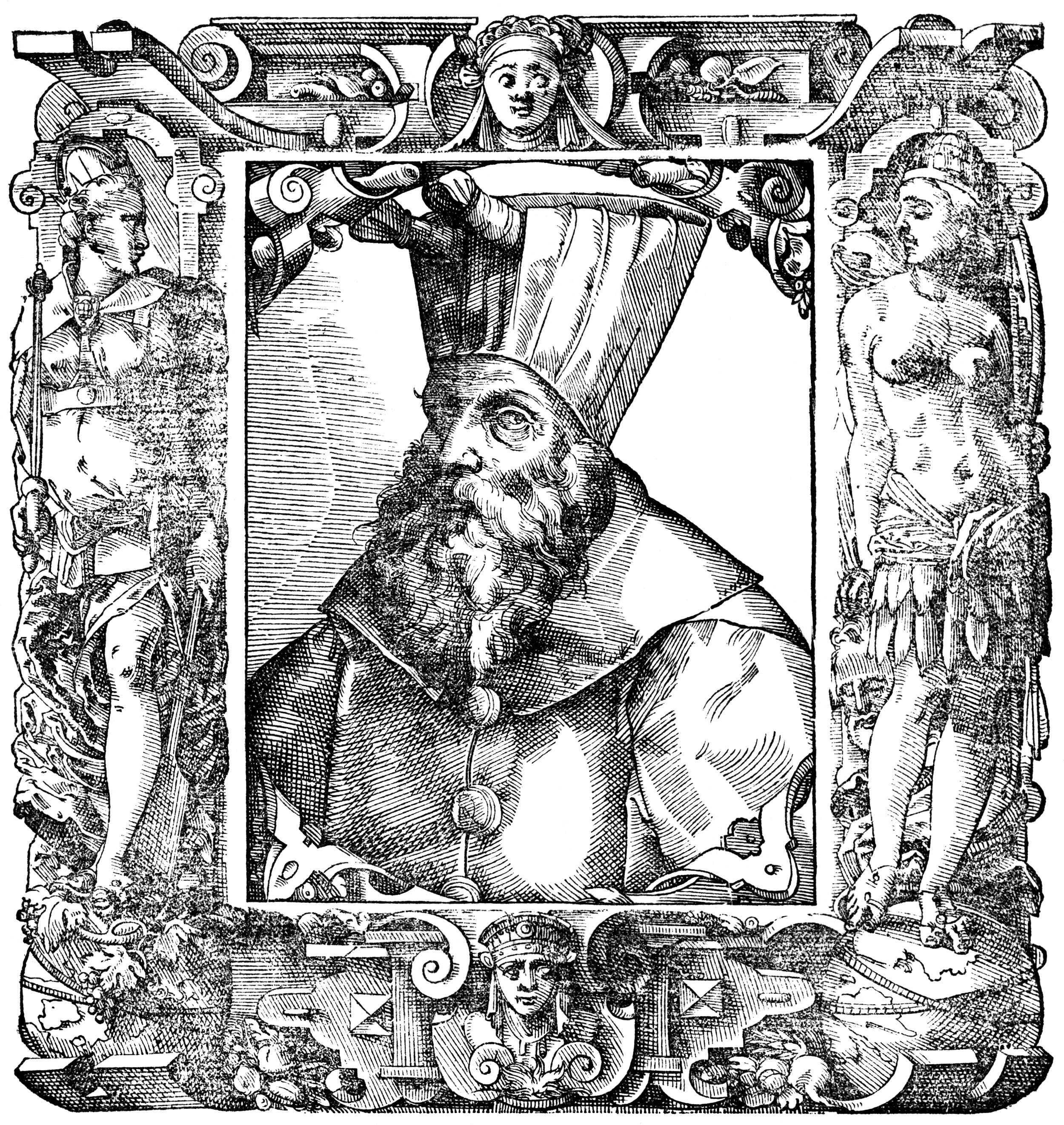
Paolo Giovio's portrait of Sultan al-Ghuri, finished before 1552.

Accompanied by a Mamluk escort, they journeyed through Cairo the following morning, on February 6. Crossing a hostile crowd, they arrived at the city's Citadel complex. In its interior palace, Martyr passed by two courts and a formation of eunuchs guarding the harem, eventually reaching the patio where the Sultan lounged over a heavily decorated marble dais, with a headpiece from which horns were projecting. Once the greeting ceremonial was over, he was invited to sit near the Sultan, irritating North African envoys who were present. Martyr interpreted al-Ghuri's friendly reception of him as awareness by the Sultan of "how powerful you are", referring to Isabella when he later reported back to her. They both agreed to have a second meeting, with nothing substantial coming out the first one apart from assurances by al-Ghuri of his willingness to talk. The North African envoys, however, responded negatively to the Sultan's openness to a Christian ambassador by sowing discontent among the masses, reminding them of the forced conversions of fellow Muslims in Granada. They publicly denounced the prospect of reaching any agreement with Spain. Al-Ghuri eventually succumbed to the pressure of a Mamluk military council that was determined to dismiss Martyr, and ordered Tangriberdy to sneak him out of the capital by night.

Martyr, however, refused to leave and sent Tangriberdy back with a message to the Sultan, reminding the latter that he represented the Spanish Empire, whose territorial possessions in Italy made it close to Egypt in terms of proximity and power projection. They convened in a secret meeting before dawn, (Note: It is unclear which particular argument managed to convince al-Ghuri to reverse his decision.) during which the Sultan brought up the reports of forced conversions in Spain. Martyr denied this and argued that Granadan Moors had themselves offered to convert from Islam in the wake of a failed rebellion, adding that his Christian faith "openly demands that nobody dare use violence or threats to incite people to change religion." He told the Sultan that his mission was "on behalf of the inhabitants of Jerusalem" and, in an apparently concealed threat, mentioned that Valencia and Aragon housed thousands of Muslims who had "no less freedom" than their Christian counterparts in the Spanish realm. This was likely meant to serve as a reminder to the Sultan, should any attempt be made at persecuting Christians in the Holy Land.

The mere news of our friendship, indeed, could be useful to you, given our power on land and at sea.

— Martyr to the Sultan.

Trying to find common ground with the Sultan, Martyr blamed the state of mistrust on the influence of Jews, whom he described to the Mamluk ruler as "a poisonous pest." He also informed him that Spanish fleets and troops based in southern Italy could be quickly dispatched to assist the Sultan militarily, should a war break out with the expansionist Ottoman Empire, their common foe, or in case the Mamluk state is faced with a serious internal rebellion. Al-Ghuri appeared to be convinced by Martyr's arguments. He agreed in principle to a treaty that was drafted by the ambassador with the assistance of monks from Jerusalem. The terms of the agreement granted Christians the right to rebuild or renovate churches and monasteries in the Holy Land, guaranteed their personal safety, and lowered the fine paid by pilgrims. In addition to Jerusalem, other Arab Christian communities, including those of Beirut, Bethlehem and Ramallah, were placed under Spanish protection. Al-Ghuri convinced senior military officials in his court that maintaining friendly ties with Spain would be beneficial to the Mamluk state, and discussed with them the means of keeping in check any resulting popular discontent. But, other than possible guarantees by Martyr that Mudéjar privileges will be preserved, it remains unclear whether or not the Sultan received any tangible concessions in return for agreeing to the ambassador's terms, given that no commercial affairs were discussed in the Legatio.

=== Touring the land and departure ===
In a separate development, while the document was being drafted, Martyr was given the Sultan's permission to visit the pyramids of Giza, whose silhouettes he could see from Cairo. He left early before dawn on February 7, as part of an expedition of nobles led by an Egyptian guide who was commissioned by al-Ghuri. Martyr evaluated the design and measured the perimeter of the two largest pyramids, the Great Pyramid and the Pyramid of Khafre, describing his findings in the Legatio while largely ignoring the smaller Pyramid of Menkaure. The ambassador later directed his attention towards the Great Pyramid's interior. (Note: Martyr was intrigued by local folk stories surrounding the interior of the pyramids. One of them in particular, as told by a noble from the expedition, concerned a Maghrebi traveler who had ventured into the Great Pyramid through an entrance in the southeastern side of the structure and never reappeared.) Members of the expedition were instructed to enter the monument through a southeastern entrance, while Martyr and the chief guide observed from the outside. The visitors came across a "vaulted, shell-shaped chamber" where small tombs could be found. From this, Martyr was able to confirm the pyramids' funerary nature, discarding the notion that the monuments represented the biblical "granaries of Joseph", a common perception in Christian Europe at the time. They then visited the Sphinx, whose size the ambassador measured. Martyr also noticed that day several mound-like structures along the Nile over a 50-mile distance to the southeast of the Giza necropolis. He was told that those were other pyramids and that ruins of an old city stood there, which he assumed to have been the ancient city of Memphis.

The following day, Martyr made a pilgrimage to Matareya. There, he attended a mass performed by a Franciscan friar in a hut near a sycamore tree, under which the Holy Family is believed to have rested during their flight into Egypt. Throughout his stay, Martyr took note of the ruling political establishment and described the Mamluks as "ignoble mountain types." He also observed Egypt's natural sights, including the Nile and the country's flora and fauna. On February 21, he was invited to attend his farewell ceremony at the Sultan's palace, where the latter presented him with a silk robe and some embellishing linen and fur accessories. Martyr sailed the Nile down six days later, arriving in Alexandria where he wrote his third and final Legatio letter on April 4. He set sail on April 22 and arrived in Venice on June 30.

== Aftermath and legacy ==
The Legatio Babylonica compiles the three letters that Peter Martyr wrote during this voyage, and was first published in 1511 as part of his larger Decades of the New World series, with some modifications. It is among the earliest and most extensive Western European accounts of Egypt from that period.

== Sources ==
- Anan, Mohamed Abdallah (2001). دولة الإسلام في الأندلس، الجزء السابع: نهاية الأندلس و تاريخ العرب المتنصرين [Nation of Islam in al-Andalus, Volume 7: End of al-Andalus and history of the Moriscos]. General Egyptian Book Organization. ISBN 9770186651.
- d'Anghiera, Peter Martyr; MacNutt, Francis A. (1912). De Orbe Novo: The Eight Decades of Peter Martyr D'Anghera, Volume 1 [Translated from the Latin with Notes and Introduction]. G.P. Putnam's Sons.
- Burke, Ulick R. (1895). A History of Spain from the Earliest Times to the Death of Ferdinand the Catholic. Longmans, Green.
- Carr, Matthew (2009). Blood and Faith: The Purging of Muslim Spain, 1492-1614. Hurst Publishers. ISBN 9781849040273.
- Cravioto, Enrique Gozálbez (2003). "La visita a las pirámides de Egipto de un erudito renacentista: Mártir de Anglería". Boletín de la Asociación Española de Orientalistas. 39: 79–87.
- Fernández, L. Suárez (1980). "Las relaciones de los Reyes Católicos con Egipto". En la España Medieval. 1: 507–519.
- Galán, José M. (2000). "Unamón". Cuatro viajes en la literatura del Antiguo Egipto. Consejo Superior de Investigaciones Científicas. ISBN 9788400078805.
- Har-El, Shai (1995). Struggle for Domination in the Middle East: The Ottoman-Mamluk War, 1485-91. Brill. ISBN 9789004101807.
- Harvey, Leonard P. (1992). "The Political, Social and Cultural History of the Moriscos". In Jayyusi, Salma K.; Marín, Manuela (eds.). The Legacy of Muslim Spain. Brill. ISBN 9789004095991.
- Harvey, Leonard P. (2005). Muslims in Spain, 1500 to 1614. University of Chicago Press. ISBN 9780226319636.
- Koningsveld, P. S.; Wiegers, G. A. (1996). "Islam in Spain During the Early Sixteenth Century: The Views of the Four Chief Judges in Cairo". In de Moor, Ed; Zwartjes, Otto; van Gelder, G. J. H.; de Moor, Eduardus Cornelius Maria (eds.). Poetry, Politics and Polemics: Cultural Transfer Between the Iberian Peninsula and North Africa. Rodopi. ISBN 9789042001053.
- Maynard, Theodore (1931). "Peter Martyr D'Anghiera: Humanist and Historian". The Catholic Historical Review. 16 (4): 435–448. JSTOR 25012806.
- Meyerson, Mark D. (1991). The Muslims of Valencia in the Age of Fernando and Isabel: Between Coexistence and Crusade. University of California Press. ISBN 9780520068889.
- Sanuto, Marino (1880). I diarii di Marino Sanuto: (MCCCCXCVI-MDXXXIII) dall' autografo Marciano ital. cl. VII codd. CDXIX-CDLXXVII, Volume 4. F. Visentini.
- Tremlett, Giles (2017). Isabella of Castile: Europe's First Great Queen. Bloomsbury Publishing. ISBN 9781408853962.
- Wagner, Henry R. (1947). "Peter Martyr and his works". Proceedings of the American Antiquarian Society. 56 (2): 239.
