= Chicora =

Legendary Native American kingdom

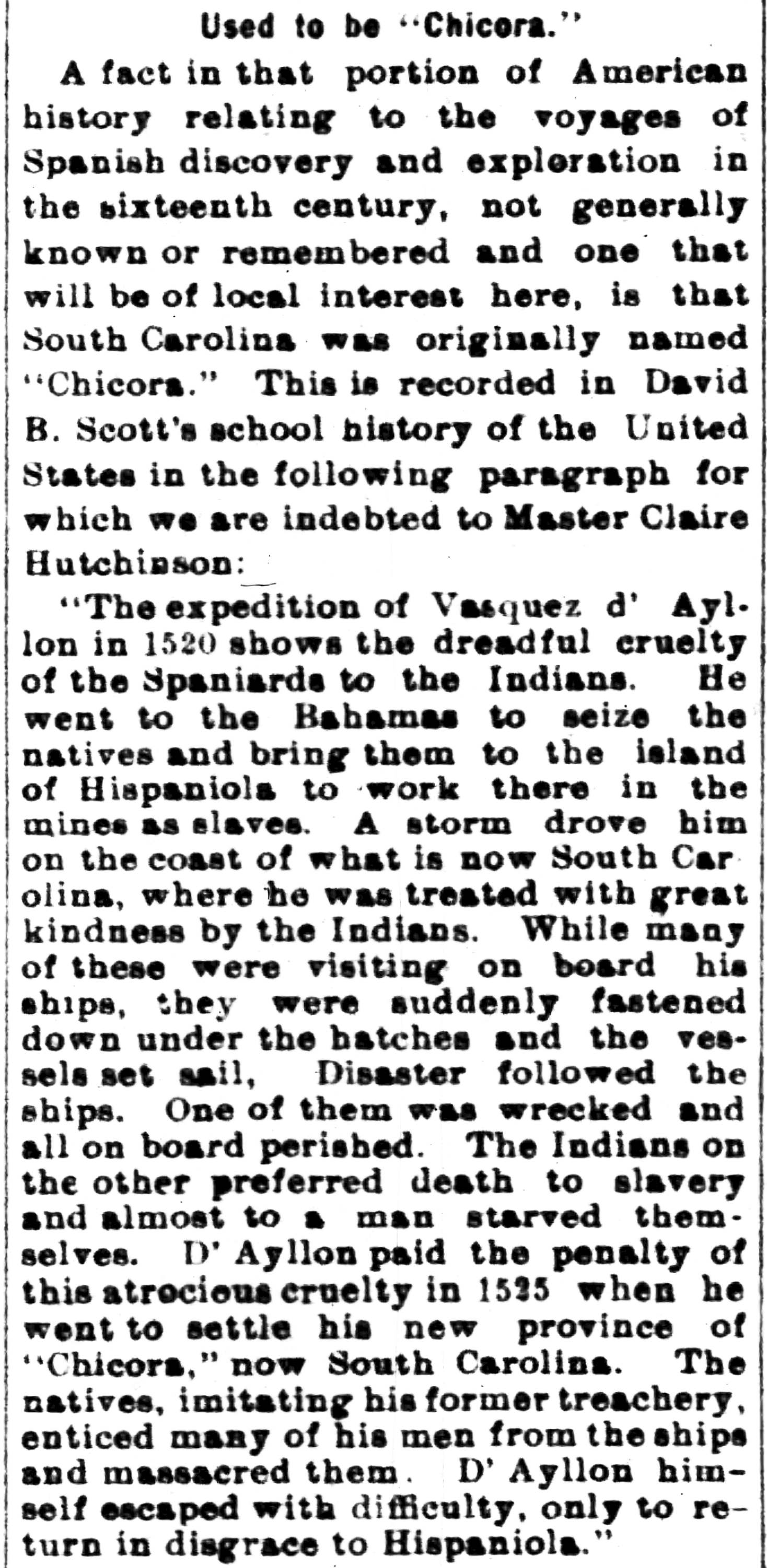
Artitle in The News-Palladium (1895) describing "Chicora" as the original name of South Carolina.

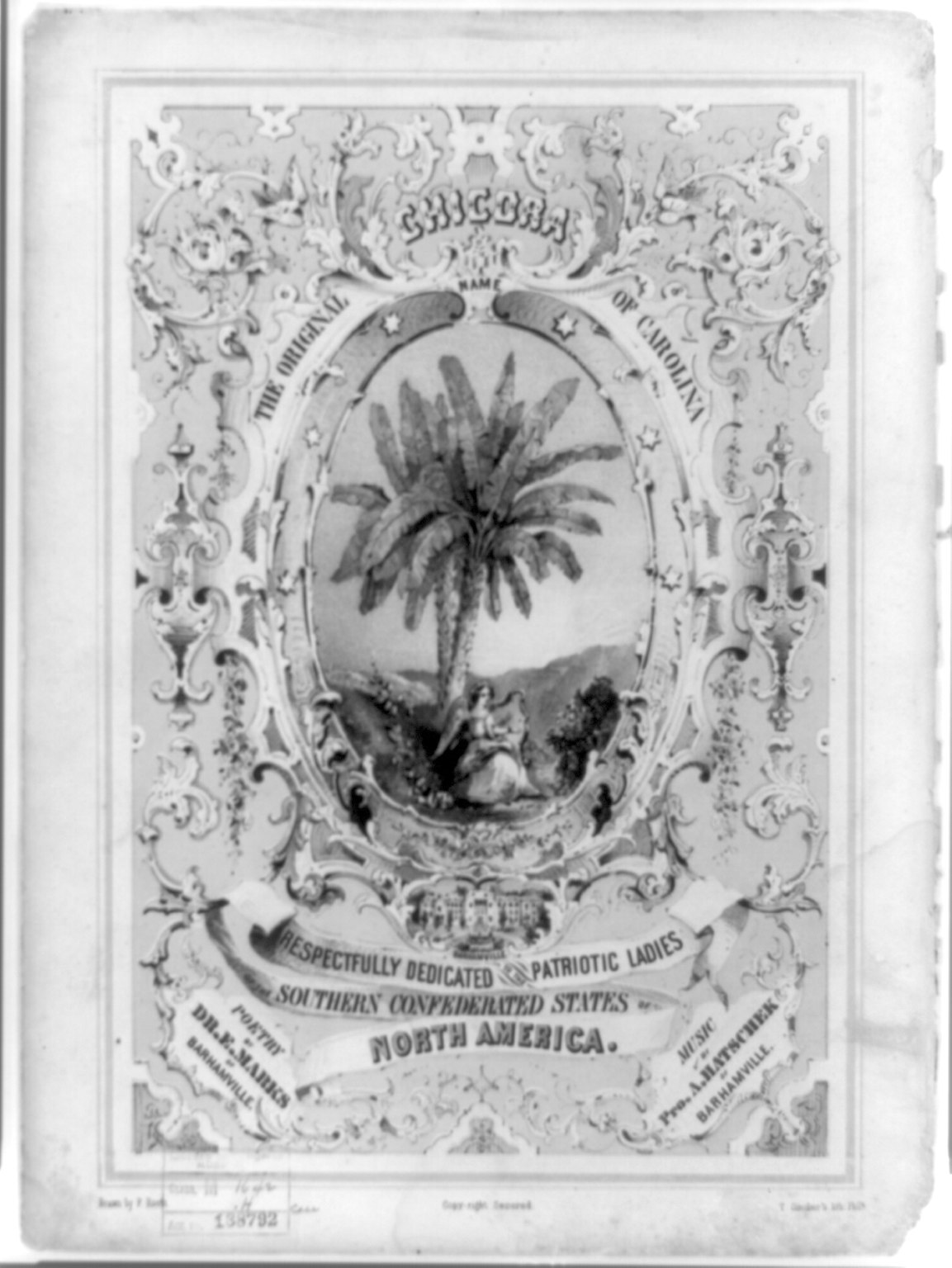
"Chicora the original name of Carolina", an 1861 song by E. Marks and A. Hatschek.

Chicora was a legendary Native American kingdom or tribe sought during the 16th century by various European explorers in present-day South Carolina. The legend originated after Spanish slave traders captured a Native American they called Francisco de Chicora in 1521; afterward, they came to treat Francisco's home country as a land of abundant wealth and natural resources. The "Chicora Legend" influenced both the Spaniards and the French in their attempts to colonize North America for the next 60 years.

== History ==
In 1521, Spanish slavers Pedro de Quexo and Francisco Gordillo embarked on an expedition from the Caribbean to the little-explored mainland of what is now the Southeastern United States. On June 24, they sighted what is thought to be the area around the mouth of the Santee River; they named their discovery the Land of St. John the Baptist. For the next 22 days they explored the river and nearby Winyah Bay and made contact with the locals, including, they claimed, a town or people called Chicora. Ultimately, the slavers compelled around 60 Natives to board their ships and then sailed off without warning, intending to sell the captives into slavery in Hispaniola. Among the captives was a Native American who the Spaniards eventually named Francisco de Chicora.

Upon their return, Gordillo's backer Lucas Vázquez de Ayllón petitioned the Spanish Real Audiencia for the right to conquer and settle the land. The next year he took his case to the crown in Spain, promoting his claim with evidently exaggerated tales about the bounty that awaited in Chicora. By this time Francisco de Chicora (or Francisco Chicorano) had been baptized and learned Spanish, and started working as Ayllón's personal servant. He joined Ayllón in Spain, and contributed to his master's accounts of the wealth of his homeland. Ayllón moved the coordinates of the land from the 33.5 degrees north recorded by Gordillo to 35–37 degrees. Evidently, this was an effort to sell Chicora as a "new Andalusia" by giving it parallel coordinates to the famously fertile area of Spain. The Crown granted Ayllón's request. Peter Martyr d'Anghiera also met with Ayllón and Francisco and recorded notes about "Chicora", which spread awareness of the territory, particularly after they were published in Martyr's chronicle Decade in 1530.

== See also ==
- Francisco de Chicora
- Winyah
- Cape Fear Indians
- Waccamaw
