= Decades of the New World =

Spanish historical anthology, 1511–1530

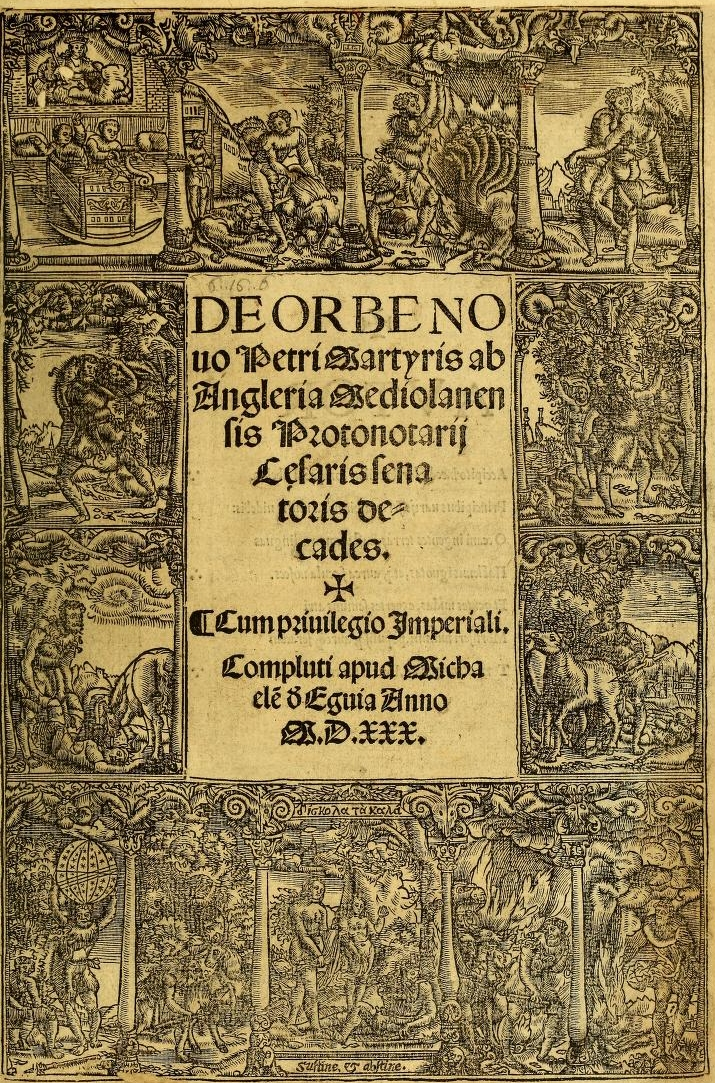
- Title page of 1530 De orbe novo (1st ed.).
- 1511 P. Martyris angli mediolanensis opera Legatio babylonica Oceani decas Poemata Epigrammata [1st dec.] 1516 Anglerius Petrus Martyr De Orbe Novo Decades [1st–3rd dec.] 1521 De nuper sub D. Carolo repertis insulis, simulq[ue] incolarum moribus, r. Petri Martyris Enchiridion, dominae Margaritae, divi Max. caes. filiae dicatum [4th dec.] 1530 De orbe nouo Petri Martyris ab Angleria Mediolanensis Protonotarij Cesaris senatoris decades [1st–8th dec.]
- Author: Peter Martyr d'Anghiera
- Country: Spain, Switzerland
- Language: Latin
- Discipline: Official, narrative history
- Publisher: Jacobo Cromberger, Arnao Guillén de Brocar, Adam Petri, Michaelis de Eguia
- Published: 1511–1530
- Published in English: 1555–1612
- Media type: Print
- No. of books: 4

Decades of the New World (Latin: De orbe novo decades; Spanish: Décadas del nuevo mundo), by Peter Martyr d'Anghiera, is a collection of eight narrative tracts recounting early Spanish exploration, conquest and colonization of the New World, exploration of the Pacific, and related miscellany. The first four of these tracts were first published disjointly in three volumes in 1511, 1516, and 1521. All eight tracts were first anthologized, that is, first published as the completed Decades of the New World collection, in 1530. Being among the earliest histories of the Age of Discovery, the Decades are of great value to the history of geography and discovery.

== History ==
In 1530 the eight Decades were published together for the first time at Alcalá. Later editions of single or of all the Decades appeared at Basel (1533), Cologne (1574), Paris (1587), and Madrid (1892). A German translation was published in Basle in 1582; a French one by Gaffarel in Recueil de voyages et de documents pour servir à l'histoire de la Geographie (Paris, 1907).

The first three decades were translated into English by Richard Eden and published in 1555 (found in Arber's The first three English books on America Birmingham, 1885), thus beginning the genre of English discovery travel writing, which stimulated English exploration of the New World. Eden's translations were reprinted with supplementary materials in 1577 by Richard Willes under the new title, The historie of travayle into the West and east Indies. Richard Hakluyt had the remaining five decades translated into English by Michael Lok and published in London in 1612.

== Contents ==
The Decades describe the early contacts of Europeans and Native Americans derived from narratives of the voyages of Christopher Columbus in the Caribbean, reports from Hernán Cortés's Mexican expedition, and other such resources. They consisted of eight reports, two of which Martyr had previously sent as letters describing the voyages of Columbus, to Cardinal Ascanius Sforza in 1493 and 1494. In 1501 Martyr, as requested by the Cardinal of Aragon, added eight chapters on the voyage of Columbus and the exploits of Martin Alonzo Pinzón. In 1511 he added a supplement giving an account of events from 1501 to 1511. By 1516 he had finished two other Decades:

- The first was devoted to the exploits of Alonso de Ojeda, Diego de Nicuesa, and Vasco Núñez de Balboa. It was first published against his consent in a Venetian-Italian summary in Venice in 1504, reprinted in 1507, and published in a Latin translation in 1508. The original Latin text was published in 1511.
- The second gave an account of Balboa's discovery of the Pacific Ocean, Columbus' fourth voyage, and the expeditions of Pedrarias Dávila.
- The first three appeared together at Alcalá de Henares in 1516 under the title: De orbe novo decades cum Legatione Babylonica.
- The Enchiridion de nuper sub D. Carolo repertis insulis (Basle, 1521) was printed as the fourth Decade, describing the voyages of Francisco Hernández de Córdoba, Juan de Grijalva, and Hernán Cortés.
- The fifth Decade (1523) dealt with the conquest of the Aztec Empire and the circumnavigation of the world by Ferdinand Magellan.
- The sixth Decade (1524) gave an account of Dávila's discoveries on the west coast of America.
- The seventh Decade (1525) had collected descriptions of the customs of the natives in present-day South Carolina, including the "Testimony of Francisco de Chicora", a Native American taken captive there; as well as those of natives in Florida, Haiti, Cuba, and Darién.
- The eighth Decade (1525) told the story of the march of Cortés against Olit.

=== Table ===
Contents of Decades of the New World. (Note: Page count as per 1907 French edition OL 18050571W.)
Decade	Length	Contents	Written	Published	Colophon	OCLC	Note
First	10 lib. 128 pp.	on first three Columbus voyages; on New World; on Hispaniola colony; on other non-Columbus voyages	14 May 1493 – Dec. 1510	Apr. 1511 Seville, Crown of Castile	Hispali: Jacobu[m] Corumberger alemanu[m]	744565159	Originally denominated Oceani decas. Revised in 1516 edition. Plagiarized translation of incomplete 1501 draft published 1504. (Note: First seven liberi plagiarised in Albertino Vercellese, Libretto de tutta la navigazione de Re de Spagna, de le Isole et terreni novamente trovati, Venezia per Albertino da Lisona vercellese, 10 April 1504 (1st ed.). First reprinted in Francenzo da Montalboddo, Paesi Nouamente retrouati et Nouo Mondo da Alberico Vesputio Florentino intitulato, Vicentia cu[n] la impensa de Mgro Henrico Vicentino, 3 November 1507. Thereafter widely translated and reprinted, including translations from the plagiarized Venetian language into Latin. Cro 2003, pp. 48-52, argues this 1511 edition was not unauthorised.)
Second	10 lib. 86 pp.	on Middle American voyages; con Darién colonization	1514	9 Nov. 1516 Alcalá, Crown of Castile	Alcala: contubernio Arnaldi Guillelmi	1046912819	–
Third	10 lib. 127 pp.	on last Columbus voyage; on Balboa voyages; on Pedrarias Dávila expedition; on Hispaniola; on Darién	1514–1516	9 Nov. 1516 Alcalá, Crown of Castile	Alcala: contubernio Arnaldi Guillelmi	1046912819	–
Fourth	10 lib. 47 pp.	on Yucatán expeditions; on Mesoamerica; on Hispaniola; on Darién	1520	1521 Basel, Swiss Confederacy	Basileae: [Adam Petri]	824268303	–
Fifth	10 lib. 149 pp.	on Cortés conquest; on Tenochtitlan; on Magallanes circumnavigation	1521–1523	Dec. 1530 Madrid, Crown of Castile	Compluti: Michaele[m] d[e] Eguia	1334839188	–
Sixth	10 lib. 27 pp.	on southern Central America; on Maluku Islands controversy	1524	Dec. 1530 Madrid, Crown of Castile	Compluti: Michaele[m] d[e] Eguia	1334839188	–
Seventh	10 lib. 78 pp.	on Cortés rivalry; on conquistadors; on cosmography; on Hispaniola	1524	Dec. 1530 Madrid, Crown of Castile	Compluti: Michaele[m] d[e] Eguia	1334839188	–
Eighth	10 lib. 85 pp.	on Cortés rivalry; on Mesoamerica; on other voyages; on Maluku Islands	1524–1525	Dec. 1530 Madrid, Crown of Castile	Compluti: Michaele[m] d[e] Eguia	1334839188	–

== Editions ==
- P. Martyris ab Angleria Mediolonensi. Opera: Legatio babylonica; Occeanea decas; Poemata. Impressum Hispali (Seville): per Jacobu(m) Corumberger alemanu(m), 1511 (Includes only first Decade).
- Petri Martyris. De orbe novo Decades. In illustri oppido Carpetanae p(ro)vinciae Co(m)pluto quod vulgariter dicitur Alcala: in contubernio Arnaldi Guillelmi, 1516 (Includes only first three Decades).
- Petri Martyris ab Angleria Mediolanensis protonotarij Cęsaris senatoris. De orbe novo decades. Compluti: apud Michaele(m) de Eguia, 1530 (First complete edition).
- Petri Martyris ab Angleria Mediolanen. De rebus oceanicis & Orbe nouo decades tres Apud Ioannem Bebelium (Basileae), 1533.
- Peter Martyr of Angleria. The Decades of the Newe Worlde or West India, conteynyng the nauigations and conquestes of the Spanyardes with the particular description of the moste ryche and large landes and Ilandes lately founde in the west Ocean perteynyng to the inheritaunce of the kinges of Spayne […]. Wrytten in the Latine tounge[sic] and translated into Englysche by Rycharde Eden. Londini (London): in ædibus Guilhelmi Powell, 1555.
- Peter Martyr d'Anghiera, De orbe novo, translated from the Latin with notes and introduction by Francis Augustus MacNutt (2 vol.), Putnam (New York), 1912.
- Peter Martyr d'Anghiera, Decadas del nuevo mundo, 1944.
- Petrus Martyr de Anghieria, Opera: Legatio Babylonica, De Orbe novo decades octo, Opus Epistolarum, Graz: Akademische Druck- U. Verlagsanstalt, 1966 ISBN 3-201-00250-X

=== Table ===
Select editions of Decades of the New World. (Note: Including plagiarized editions.)
Title	Contents	Collaborator	Colophon	Date and Place	Language	OCLC	Note
Libretto de tutta la nauigatione de Re de Spagna, de le Isole et terreni nouamente trouati	partial 1st dec.	Angelo Trevisan, Albertino Vercellese	Venesia: Albertino da Lisona vercellese	10 Apr. 1504 Venice, Republic of Venice	Italian	–	Plagiarized in 1501 from incomplete Latin draft copy. (Note: Copy in John Carter Brown Library, call no. R H490.P853q. First facsimile of this copy published 1929, Lawrence C. Wroth editor, OCLC 3877063. Trevisan's manuscript translations, made in 1501, rediscovered in 1892 (in library of Sneyd of Newcastle, son of Walter Sneyd of London) and published by Guglielmo Berchet in the 1892 Raccolta di documenti e studi pubblicati dalla R. Commissione colombiana, pt. 3, vol. 1, pp. 46–82, OCLC 1086578217.)
Paesi nouamente retrouati et Nouo Mondo da Alberico Vesputio Florentino intitulato	partial 1st dec.	Francanzano da Montalboddo	Vicentia: impensa de Mgro Henrico Vicentino	3 Nov. 1507 Vicenza, Republic of Venice	Italian	29137136	First reprint of plagiarized 1504 edition. (Note: Copy in John Carter Brown Library, call no. H507.P126n.)
Itinerariu[m] Portugalle[n]siu[m] e Lusitania in India[m] [et] inde in occidentem [et] demum ad aquilonem	partial 1st dec.	Archangelo Madrignani	[Mediolani: Giovanni Angelo Scinzenzeler]	1 Jun. 1508 Milan, Duchy of Milan	Latin	9088072846	First Latin translation of 1507 edition.
Neuwe umbekanthe landte und ein new weldte in kurtz verganger zeythe erfunden	partial 1st dec.	Jobst Ruchamer	Nüreinbergk: mich Georgen Stüchssen	20 Sep. 1508 Nuremberg, Free Imperial City of Nuremberg	German	–	First German translation of 1507 edition. (Note: Digitized copy in John Carter Brown Library, call no. 1-SIZE H508.P126n3.)
Paesi nouamente ritrouati & Nouo Mo[n]do da Alberico Vesputio Florentino intitulato	partial 1st dec.	–	Milano: Jo. Jacobo et fratelli da Lignano	17 Nov. 1508 Milan, Duchy of Milan	Italian	–	First reprint of 1507 edition. (Note: Copy in John Carter Brown Library, call no. H508.P126n2.)
Nye vnbekande Lande Unde eine nye Werldt in korter vorgangener Tyd gefunden	partial 1st dec.	Henning Ghetelen, Jobst Ruchamer	Nüreinberch: my Jürgen Stüchssen	18 Nov. 1508 Nuremberg, Free Imperial City of Nuremberg	German	9811828300	Second German translation of 1507 edition. (Note: Copy in John Carter Brown Library, call no. 1-SIZE H508.P126n1.)
S’ensuyt le Nouveau monde et navigations faictes par Émeric de Vespuci, Florentin, des pays et isles nouvellement trouvez, auparavant à nous incongneuz, tant en l’Éthiope que Arrabie, Calichut et aultres plusier régions estranges	partial 1st dec.	Mathurin du Redouer	Paris: de P. Le Noir	1510 Paris, Kingdom of France	French	1100239410	First French translation of 1507 edition.
P[etrus] Martyris angli mediolanensis opera Legatio babylonica Oceani decas Poemata Epigrammata	1st dec.	–	Hispali: Jacobu[m] Corumberger alemanu[m]	Apr. 1511 Seville, Crown of Castile	Latin	744565159	First edition to contain the complete first decade.
Paesi nouame[n]te ritrouati [et] Nouo Mondo da Alberico Vesputio Florentino intitulato	partial 1st dec.	–	Milano: Io. Iacobo & Fratelli da Lignano	1512 Milan, Duchy of Milan	Italian	–	Second reprint of 1507 edition. (Note: Copy in John Carter Brown Library, call no. H512.P126n.)
S’ensuyt le Nouveau Monde & navigations: faictes par Emeric de Vespuce, Florentin, des pays & isles nouvellement trouvez, auparavant a nous incongneuz tant en lethiope que Arrabie, Calichut et aultres plusier régions estranges	partial 1st dec.	–	Paris: veuve de Jean I Trepperel et Jean Jehannot	1515 Paris, Kingdom of France	French	1254656851	Second French translation of 1507 edition.
Anglerius Petrus Martyr De Orbe Novo Decades	1st–3rd dec.	–	Alcala: contubernio Arnaldi Guillelmi	9 Nov. 1516 Alcalá, Crown of Castile	Latin	1046912819	First edition to contain second and third decades.
De nvper svb D. Carolo repertis insulis, simulq[ue] incolarum moribus, r. Petri Martyris Enchiridion, dominae Margaritae, divi Max. caes. filiae dicatum	4th dec.	–	Basileae: [Adam Petri]	1521 Basel, Swiss Confederacy	Latin	824268303	First edition to contain fourth decade.
De orbe nouo Petri Martyris ab Angleria Mediolanensis Protonotarij Cesaris senatoris decades	all dec.	–	Compluti: Michaele[m] d[e] Eguia	Dec. 1530 Madrid, Crown of Castile	Latin	1334839188	First edition to contain all eight decades.
The Decades of the Newe Worlde or West India	1st–3rd dec.	Richard Eden	Londini: Guilhelmi Powell	1555 London, Kingdom of England	English	671311867	First English edition to contain first three decades.
De nouo orbe, or the historie of the west Indies	all dec.	Michael Lok, Richard Eden	London: [by Thomas Dawson] for Thomas Adams	1612 London, Kingdom of England	English	367981073	First complete English edition.
Fuentes históricas sobre Colón y América	all dec.	Joaquín Torres Asensio	Madrid: San Francisco de Sales	1892 Madrid, Kingdom of Spain	Spanish	697768851	First complete Spanish edition.
Décadas del nuevo mundo	all dec.	Agustín Millares Carlo, Edmundo O'Gorman, Joseph H. Sinclair	México: José Porrúa e Hijos	1964–1965 Mexico City, Mexico	Spanish	79175629	First complete Mexican edition.

== See also ==
- Peter Martyr map, from the 1511 edition of Decades
