= Francisco de Chicora =

Native from present-day South Carolina kidnapped by Spanish explorers in 1521

Francisco de Chicora was the baptismal name given to a Native American kidnapped in 1521, along with 70 others, from near Winyah Bay by Spanish explorer Francisco Gordillo and slave trader Pedro de Quexos, based in Santo Domingo and the first Europeans to reach the area. From analysis of the account by Peter Martyr, court chronicler, the ethnographer John R. Swanton believed that Chicora was from a Catawban group.

In Hispaniola, where he and the other captives were taken, Chicora learned Spanish, was baptized a Catholic, and worked for Lucas Vasquez de Ayllón, a colonial official. Most of the natives died within two years. Accompanying Ayllón to Spain, de Chicora met with the chronicler Peter Martyr and told him much about his people. Martyr combined this information with accounts by explorers and recorded it as the "Testimony of Francisco de Chicora," published with his seventh Decade in 1525. In 1526, Chicora accompanied Ayllón on a major expedition to North America with 600 colonists. After they struck land at the Santee River and the party went ashore, Chicora escaped and returned to his people.

== Spanish encounter with natives at the Pee Dee River ==
The Spaniards had made repeated expeditions to the southeastern part of what is now the United States, where they explored areas around the Santee River in present-day South Carolina and Winyah Bay and other areas. Lucas Vázquez de Ayllón, oidor (judge) of the royal Audencia of Santa Domingo, commissioned Francisco Gordillo to make an expedition to the continent in 1520. Gordillo sailed north from Hispaniola through the Bahamas, where near the island of Lucayoneque he fell in with a caravel commanded by the slave raider Pedro de Quexos (Pedro de Quejo), who was trying to capture Arawak to sell as slaves, without success. Quexos happened to be a relative of Gordillo's pilot Alonzo Fernandez Sotil, and decided to join Gordilla's expedition, and in June 1521 the two struck land at what they called the River of San Juan Bautista (St. John the Baptist), traditionally identified as Winyah Bay based on coordinates but more recently alternatively suggested as the Pee Dee River by linguist Blair A. Rudes. A crowd of curious natives gathered on the shore to watch the strangers. The natives fled when the Spanish approached in shallops, but two were caught, taken aboard a ship, given Spanish clothes, and returned ashore. The natives again swarmed the beach, seeing their comrades' return and changed appearance as a wondrous sign, since they had worn only buckskins before. The chief ordered 50 of his subjects to bring food for the Spaniards. Once ashore, the Spaniards were given presents and a guided tour for several days. They claimed the land for their king, and invited the natives aboard to see their ships.

Gordillo had been ordered by de Ayllón to cultivate friendly relations with the people to prepare for later colonization. De Quexos, eager for slaves, persuaded him to trick the natives; the Spaniards suddenly raised anchor and set sail for Santo Domingo with 70 of the natives still aboard, including the man who would be named Francisco. When they arrived, Ayllón condemned the leaders for their treachery. He took the matter before a commission headed by Diego Columbus. The commission declared the captive natives to be free, and ordered them returned to the mainland, but such a trip never took place, as it was considered too costly. As recounted by Peter Martyr the court chronicler, according to colonial reports, most of the natives died within two years; many wandered the streets of Santo Domingo as vagrants, and few survived. One who survived was baptized Francisco de Chicora; he learned Spanish and worked for Ayllón.

Lucas Vázquez de Ayllón took the engaging young Indian to Spain and presented him to the royal court, where he told fantastical tales about his homeland of Chicora, and the neighboring provinces of what is now the Carolinas. "Chicora" (the name the Spanish gave to the area) was evidently one of several Siouan-speaking territories subject to the chief Datha of Duahe (also recorded in Spanish as Duhare). Francisco de Chicora described the people of Duhare as "white" and having "blond hair to the heels", and told of a gigantic Indian king called Datha who ruled a race of giants and of another race of men who grew long tails. Chicora met the court chronicler, Italian historian Peter Martyr, and recounted to him much about the customs of his people in Chicora and about the neighboring provinces.

After returning to the Caribbean, in 1526, Ayllón led an expedition to North America with three ships and 600 colonists, bringing de Chicora with him. After striking land at what Ayllón named the Jordan River (now the Santee River in South Carolina), one of his ships went aground. As the party went ashore, de Chicora immediately abandoned the Spaniards and fled to rejoin his own people. He disappeared from the historical record.

== Modern scholarship ==
Researchers have worked to identify the provinces and tribes described by Chicora. They have analyzed phonetics of 16th-century Spanish, as well as the many languages of the North American tribes in the area, to reach their conclusions.

- Francisco's home province, considered by Swanton to be on the lower Pee Dee River, was called Chicora. Scholars generally consider the people a Catawban group. Swanton (1940) proposed a connection with the Sugaree or Shakori; Rudes (2004) suggested Coree.
- Duahre (or Duhare, many variant spellings) was a neighboring province described as home to Datha, the principal chief of several provinces. Ayllon is said to have marched through this province in 1526, en route to Guadalupe, where he built the short-lived colony of San Miguel de Guadalupe.

The location and ethnicity of the actual people referred to in Chicora's tall tales of Duhare has been debated; candidates have included Catawban, Guale, and Cusabo. In 2004, Blair Rudes asserted that other linguistic evidence in Martyr's account points to the Iroquoian Tuscarora tribe, and specifically their town on the Neuse River called Teyurhèhtè. He suggests, for example, that Old Tuscaroran Teeth-ha (king) corresponded with the name "Datha", which he says may have been a title rather than proper name. He also notes close similarities between accounts of a religious ceremony as recounted by Francisco de Chicora, and one among the Tuscarora recounted by a European in the early eighteenth century.

- Xapita - a province near Duahre where pearls were found, was identified with the name of the Sampit River.
- Hitha (Yta) - a province ruled by Datha, possibly Etiwaw (Eutaw), a Cusabo subtribe.
- Tihe - a province under Datha and inhabited by a priestly tribe.
- Xamunambe - another of Datha's provinces.
- Arambe, Guacaya, Quohathe, Tanzaca (Tanaca), Pahoc - These were other regions which the Spanish recorded visiting, where they noted the indigenous peoples had dark brown skin. Swanton suggests that Guacaya may correlate to Waccamaw (a Siouan tribe), and Pahoc to "Back Hooks". Rudes connects Quohathe with Coweta (a Muscogee (Creek) subtribe); Tanzaca with "Transequa", a village shown on a 1733 map on the Upper Catawba River; and Arambe with the Ilapi of Hernando de Soto (1541), also the Mississippian-culture village called Herape by Juan Pardo (1568), and the later Creek town Hilibi, which had moved farther west.
- Inziguanin - described as a nation whose inhabitants had a myth that crocodile-like men had once lived in their land. Rudes suggested Inziguanin could be a reference to the Shawnee, though they were not attested in the southeast until long afterward.

Other sources, such as Oviedo, Navarrete, Barcia, and Documentos Ineditos list additional provinces derived from Francisco de Chicora, some of which have been tentatively identified by Swanton and other researchers:

- Yamiscaron - the Yamacraw or Yamasee tribe (Guale)
- Orixa - a Cusabo subtribe on the Edisto River
- Coçayo - the "Coosa" subtribe of the Cusabo, who lived on the upper South Carolina rivers. These "Coosa" were probably not related to the Muskogean-speaking Coosa chiefdom that De Soto encountered some 15 years later in present-day northern Georgia.
- Pasqui - called the Pasque by Pardo, they lived inland near the Siouan Waxhaw tribe.
- Aymi - possibly the Hymahi of De Soto and Pardo, placed by Hudson (1990) on the Congaree River, near where it joins the Santee.
- Sona - possibly a Cusabo subtribe on the Stono River
- Yenyohol - the Winyah of Winyah Bay
- Anica, Xoxi, Huaque, Anoxa - uncertain
