= Peter Martyr d'Anghiera =

Savoyard historian (1457–1526)

- Born: 2 February 1457; Arona
- Died: October 1526; Granada
- Occupations: Historian, regular priest (1492–), prior, geographer

Peter Martyr d'Anghiera (Note: Latin: Petrus Martyr Anglerius or ab Angleria; Italian: Pietro Martire d'Anghiera; Spanish: Pedro Mártir de Anglería;) (2 February 1457 – October 1526), formerly known in English as Peter Martyr of Angleria, was a Savoyard historian at the service of Spain during the Age of Exploration. He wrote the first accounts of explorations in Central and South America in a series of letters and reports, grouped in the original Latin publications of 1511 to 1530 into sets of ten chapters called "decades". His Decades of the New World (De Orbe Novo) is of great value in the history of geography and discovery. He describes the first contacts of Europeans and Native American civilisations in the Caribbean, North America and Mesoamerica, and includes the first European reference to India rubber. The work was first translated into English in 1555, and in a fuller version in 1912.

== Life ==
Martyr was born on 2 February 1457 at Lake Maggiore in Arona in Piedmont and was later named for the nearby town of Angera. He studied under Giovanni Borromeo, then the Count of Arona. He went to Rome at the age of twenty and met important men in the hierarchy of the Catholic Church. After meeting the Spanish ambassador Íñigo López de Mendoza y Quiñones, Martyr accompanied him from Rome to Zaragoza in August 1487. Martyr soon became a notable figure among the humanists of Spain. In 1488, he lectured in Salamanca on the invitation of the university. The new learning was supported by highly placed patrons in the society. Martyr would become chaplain to the court of Ferdinand and Isabella.

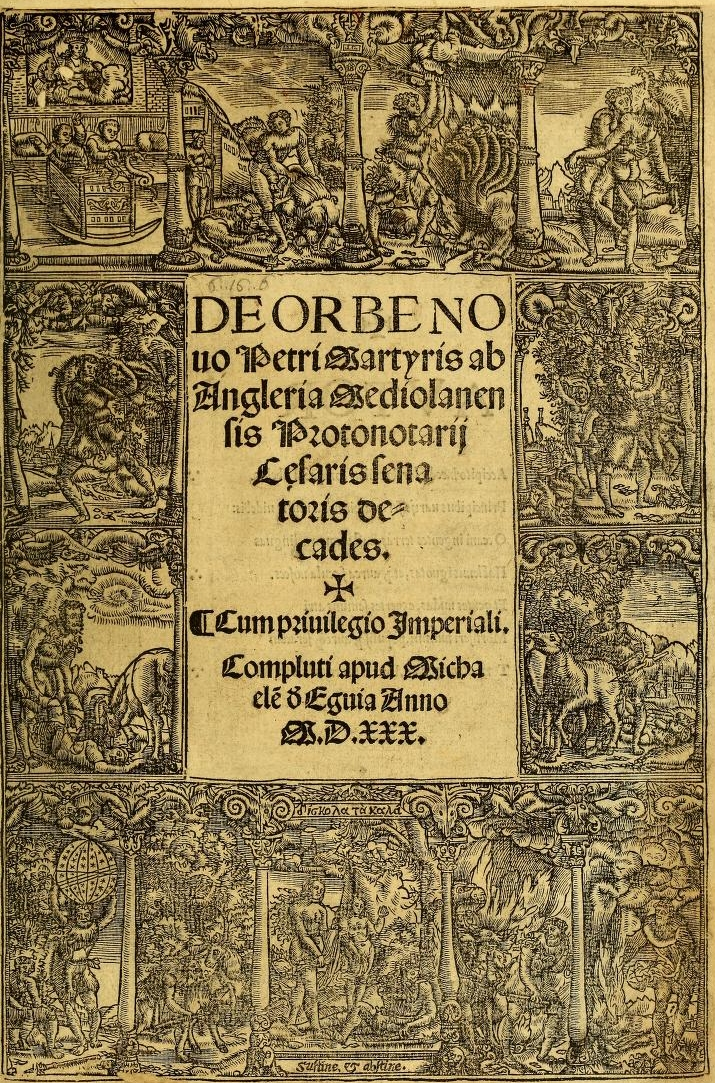
Illustrated title page of De orbe novo

After 1492, Martyr's chief task was the education of young nobles at the Spanish court. In 1501 he was sent to Egypt on a diplomatic mission to dissuade the Sultan of Egypt from taking vengeance on the Christians in Egypt and Palestine for the defeat of the Moors in Spain and the Fall of Granada. This he achieved by strongly asserting that there were no forced conversions and that Granada Muslims had asked for baptism of their own volition - plus, more importantly, promising Spanish help to Egypt against the threat of conquest by the Ottomans . He described his voyage through Egypt in the Legatio Babylonica, which was published in the 1511 edition of his Decades. Following the success of this mission, he received the title of maestro de los caballeros (master of knights).

In 1520, Martyr was given the post of chronicler (cronista) in the newly formed Council of the Indies, commissioned by Charles V, Holy Roman Emperor to describe what was occurring in the explorations of the New World. In 1523, Charles gave him the title of Count Palatine and in 1524 called him once more into the Council of the Indies. Martyr was invested by Pope Clement VII, as proposed by Charles V, as Abbot of Jamaica. Although Martyr never visited the island, as abbot, he directed the construction of the first stone church there.

He died in Granada in 1526.

== Works ==
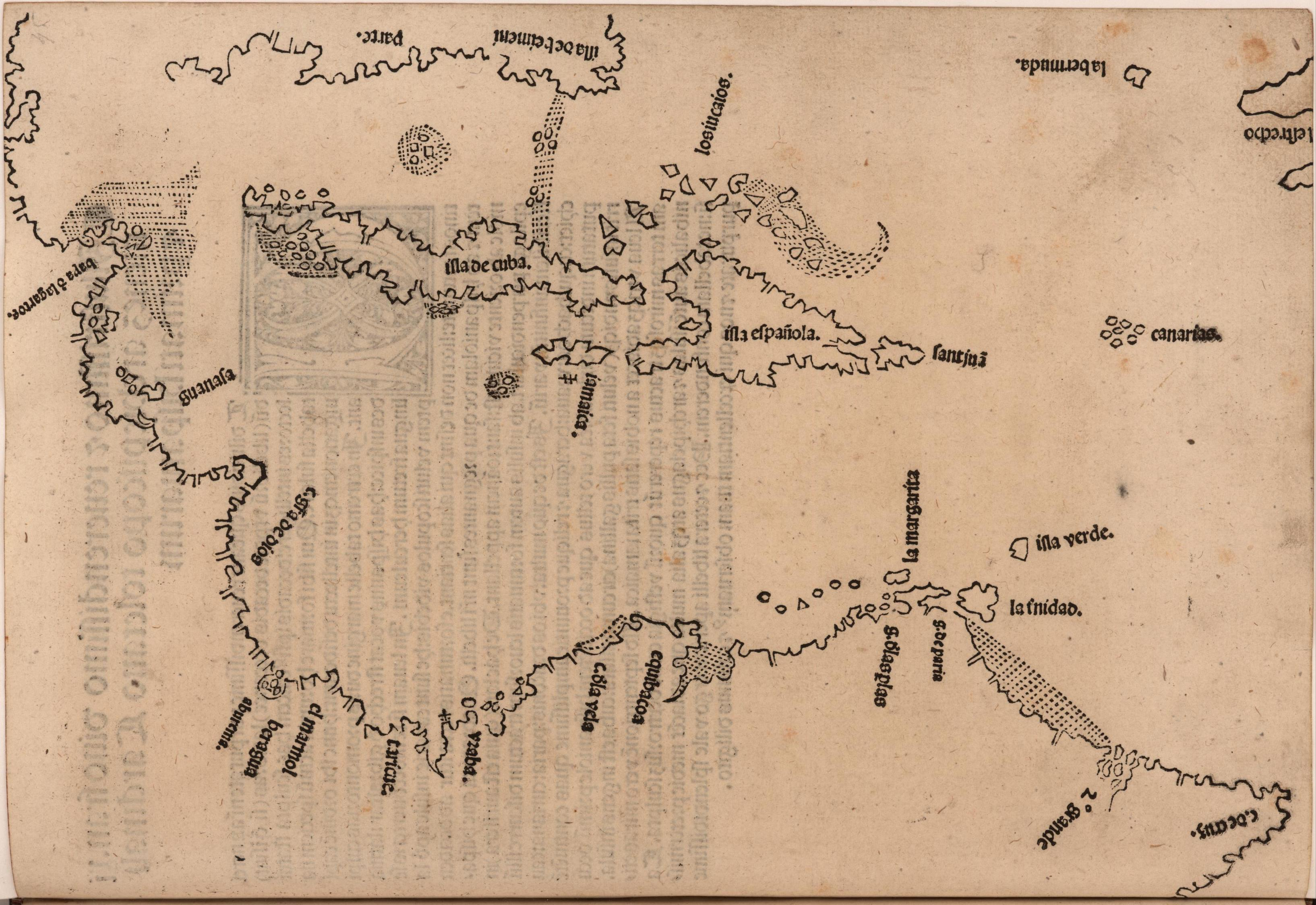
The 1511 map gives the earliest record of the Bermudas and is the first printed map specifically devoted to the Americas.

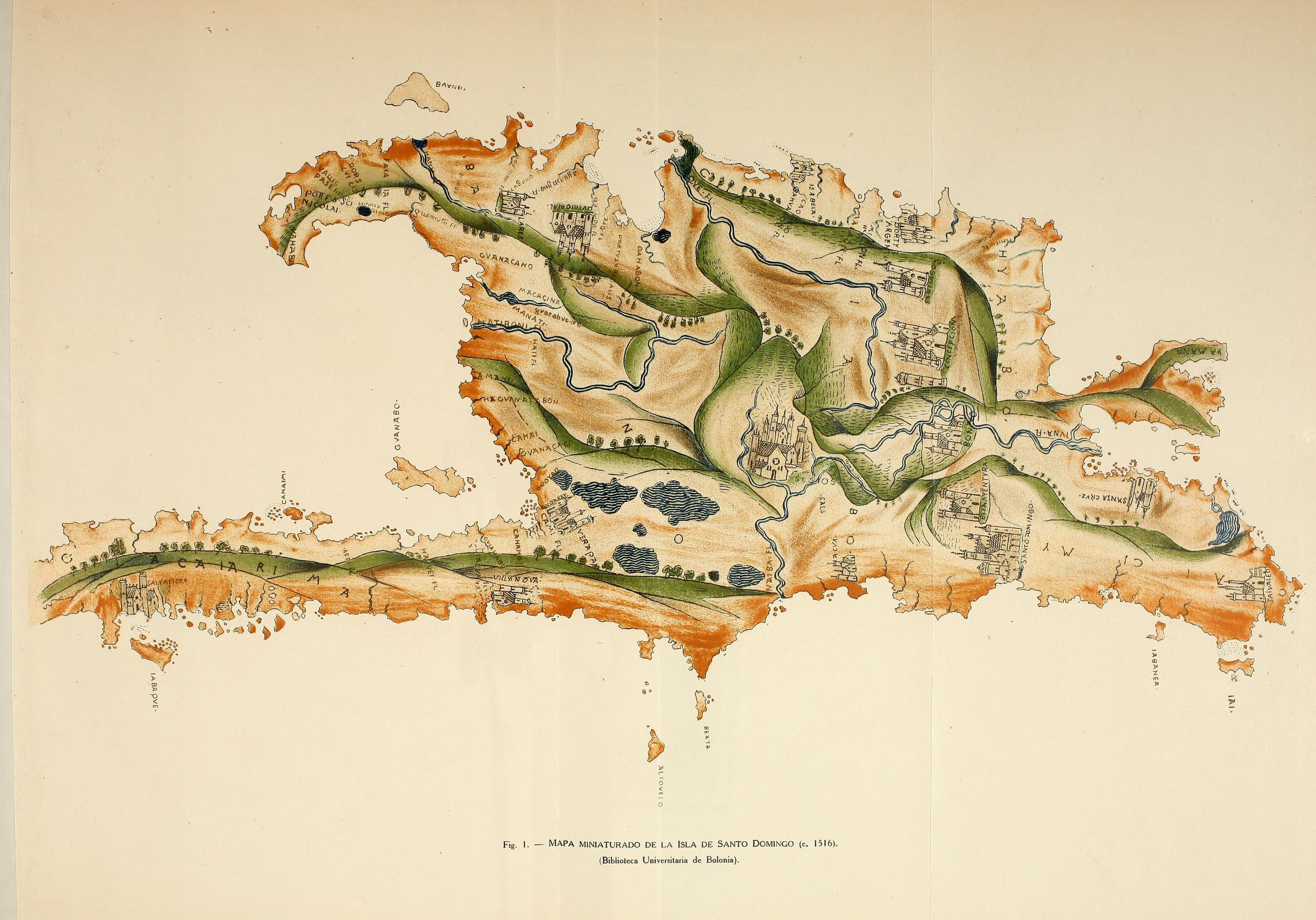
First map of the Spanish island (Hispaniola) made by Peter Martyr d'Anghiera in 1516, when the Spanish island belonged to the whole of Spain (1492-1604). The Spanish island belonged entirely to Spain until 1605, when the devastations of Osorio were carried out.

Peter Martyr was a prolific writer. He is estimated to have composed some eight hundred letters addressed to various illustrious persons relating events in Spain and the Spanish court, written in a journalistic style, often quite gossipy. Moving in court circles, Peter Martyr was personally acquainted with most of the leading figures of the day, and it is from his letters that historians have drawn many of the details about their physical appearance, personality, quirks and anecdotes.

It was as a chronicler that Martyr performed his most notable literary work. He collected documents and accounts from the discoverers, as well as personally interviewing them. He learned from the letters of Christopher Columbus and made use of the reports of the Council of the Indies. He had a great grasp of geographical issues; he was the first European to realise the significance of the Gulf Stream.

His Opera, published in Seville in 1511 (Legatio Babylonica, Oceani Decas, Poemata, Hymni, Epigrammata), included the first historical account of the Spanish discoveries.

The Decades consisted of ten reports, two of which Martyr had previously sent as letters describing the voyages of Columbus, to Cardinal Ascanius Sforza in 1493 and 1494. In 1501, Martyr, as requested by the Cardinal Luigi d'Aragona, added eight chapters on the voyage of Columbus and the exploits of Martin Alonzo Pinzón. In 1511 he added a supplement giving an account of events from 1501 to 1511.

Jointly with this Decades, he published a narrative of his experiences in Egypt with a description of the inhabitants, their country, and history. By 1516, he had finished two other Decades. By the time of his death a total of eight Decades were complete.

- The first was devoted to the exploits of Alonso de Ojeda, Diego de Nicuesa, and Vasco Núñez de Balboa
- The second gave an account of Balboa's discovery of the Pacific Ocean, Columbus' fourth voyage, and the expeditions of Pedrarias Dávila.
- Three appeared together at Alcalá de Henares in 1516 under the title: De orbe novo decades cum Legatione Babylonica.
- The Enchiridion de nuper sub D. Carolo repertis insulis (Basle, 1521) was printed as the fourth Decade, describing the voyages of Francisco Hernández de Córdoba, Juan de Grijalva, and Hernán Cortés.
- The fifth Decade (1523) dealt with the conquest of Mexico and the circumnavigation of the world by Ferdinand Magellan.
- The sixth Decade (1524) gave an account of Dávila's discoveries on the west coast of America.
- The seventh Decade (1525) had collected descriptions of the customs of the natives in present-day South Carolina, including the "Testimony of Francisco de Chicora", a Native American taken captive there; as well as those of natives in Florida, Haiti, Cuba, and Darién.
- The eighth Decade (1525) told the story of the march of Cortés against Cristobal de Olid, who attempted to set up an independent state in Honduras.

In 1530, the eight Decades were published together for the first time at Alcalá. Later editions of single or of all the Decades appeared at Basel (1533), Cologne (1574), Paris (1587), and Madrid (1892). A German translation was published in Basle in 1582; an English version may be found in Arber, The first three English books on America (Birmingham, 1885); a French one by Gaffarel in Recueil de voyages et de documents pour servir à l'histoire de la Geographie (Paris, 1907).

Martyr also wrote the letters collected in Opus epistolarum, published after his death. This collection consists of 812 letters to bishops, courtiers, generals, and statesmen of Spain and Italy, dealing with contemporary events, and especially with political developments in Spain between 1487 and 1525. It was published first at Alcalá in 1530; a new edition was issued by the House of Elzevir at Amsterdam in 1670.

== Editions ==
- De Orbe Nouo Petri Martyris Anglerii Mediolanensis Protonotarii et Caroli Quinti Senatoris Decades Octo, Diligenti Temporum Observatione et Utilissinis Annotationibus Illustratæ ... Paris: G. Auvray. Octavo. Edited by Richard Hakluyt (1587)
- Peter Martyr d'Anghiera, De orbe novo, translated from the Latin with notes and introduction by Francis Augustus MacNutt, New York: Putnam, 1912. 2 vols.
- Peter Martyr d'Anghiera, Decadas del nuevo mundo, 1944
- Petrus Martyr de Anghieria, Opera: Legatio Babylonica, De Orbe novo decades octo, Opus Epistolarum, Graz: Akademische Druck- U. Verlagsanstalt, 1966 ISBN 3-201-00250-X
