= Interregional caravan trade in East Africa =

Trade expansion in East Africa

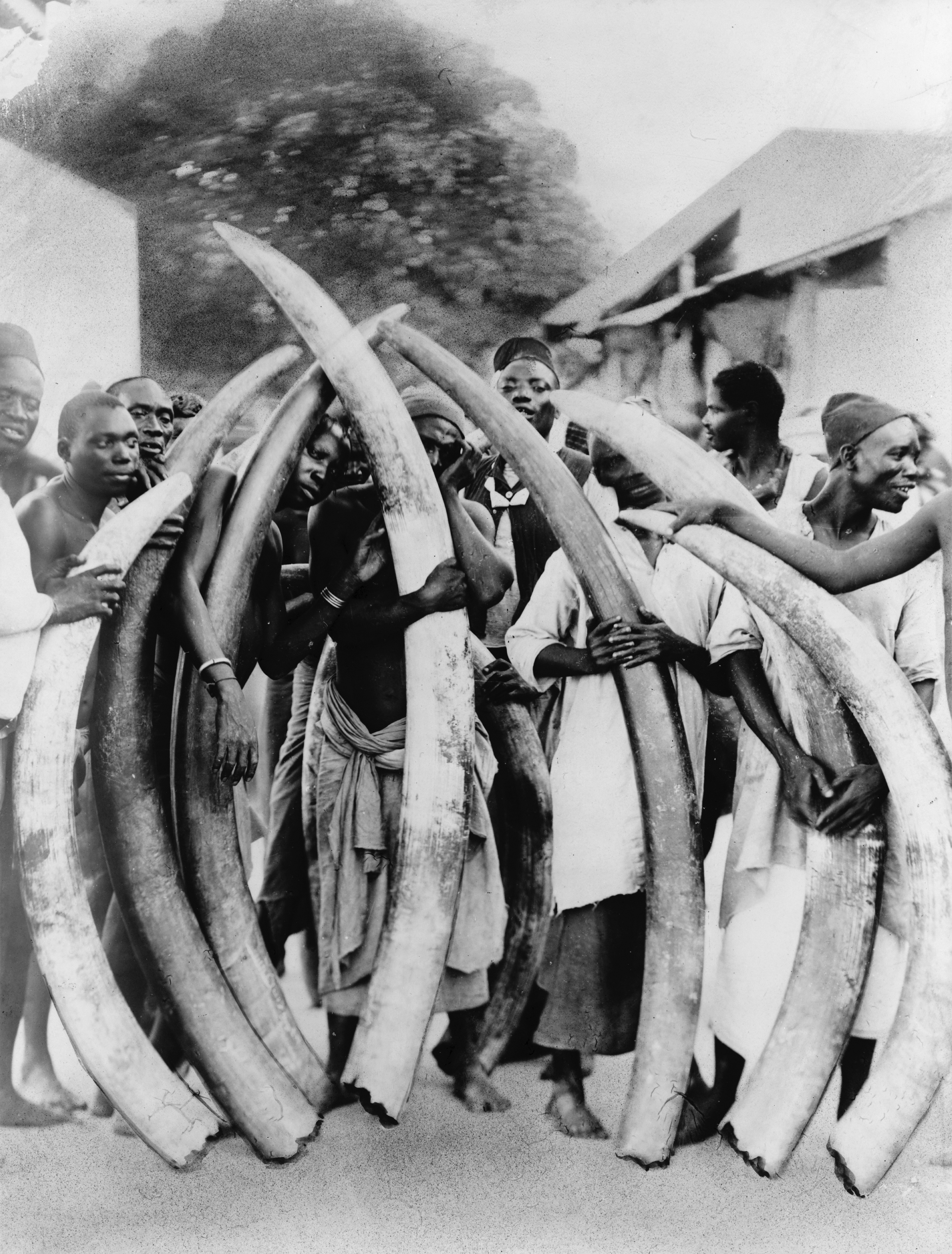
Caravan porters with ivory tusks, probably around 1890

The interregional caravan trade in East Africa was a system of long-distance trade networks connecting various regions of East Africa, primarily for the transport of ivory. It began in the 19th century, fueled by rapidly growing demand for ivory on the world market. In a period of about 70 years, the ivory trade by caravans and the struggles for its enormous profits spread across the entire territory that today includes Kenya, Uganda, Tanzania, Rwanda, Burundi, Malawi, the eastern part of Congo, and the northern part of Mozambique.

The rapidly increasing demand for ivory originated in Europe and America; the Zanzibar archipelago became the hub for the exchange of goods. Merchants from the Swahili coast and the interior organized caravans with several thousand people to purchase ivory and transport it to the coast. As there was no other available means of transport, goods were carried exclusively on human backs. Whereas previously various regional trade networks intersected, a long-distance trade network was established that reached as far as the Congo, the Great Lakes region, Buganda, and extended to the coast.

People from all regions participated in trade, either benefiting from its profits or enduring its effects. The constantly increasing importation of firearms as a commodity exchanged for ivory led, in some regions, to fundamental changes in social relations, and the struggles for control of caravan traffic affected many parts of East Africa.

Alongside commerce, a caravan culture developed, based on the long-standing trading traditions of Africans in the interior. With the intense caravan traffic, an extensive transfer and exchange of cultures took place, which, for example, favored the spread inland of Islam, written culture, and other cultural elements from the coastal regions.

Interregional caravan trade is regarded as the entry of East Africa into global capitalist trade and as a significant marker for the colonization of Tanganyika, which was established at the end of the 19th century. Even when the caravan trade based on ivory collapsed abruptly at the end of the century, the essential structures of the commercial system endured and determined future developments.

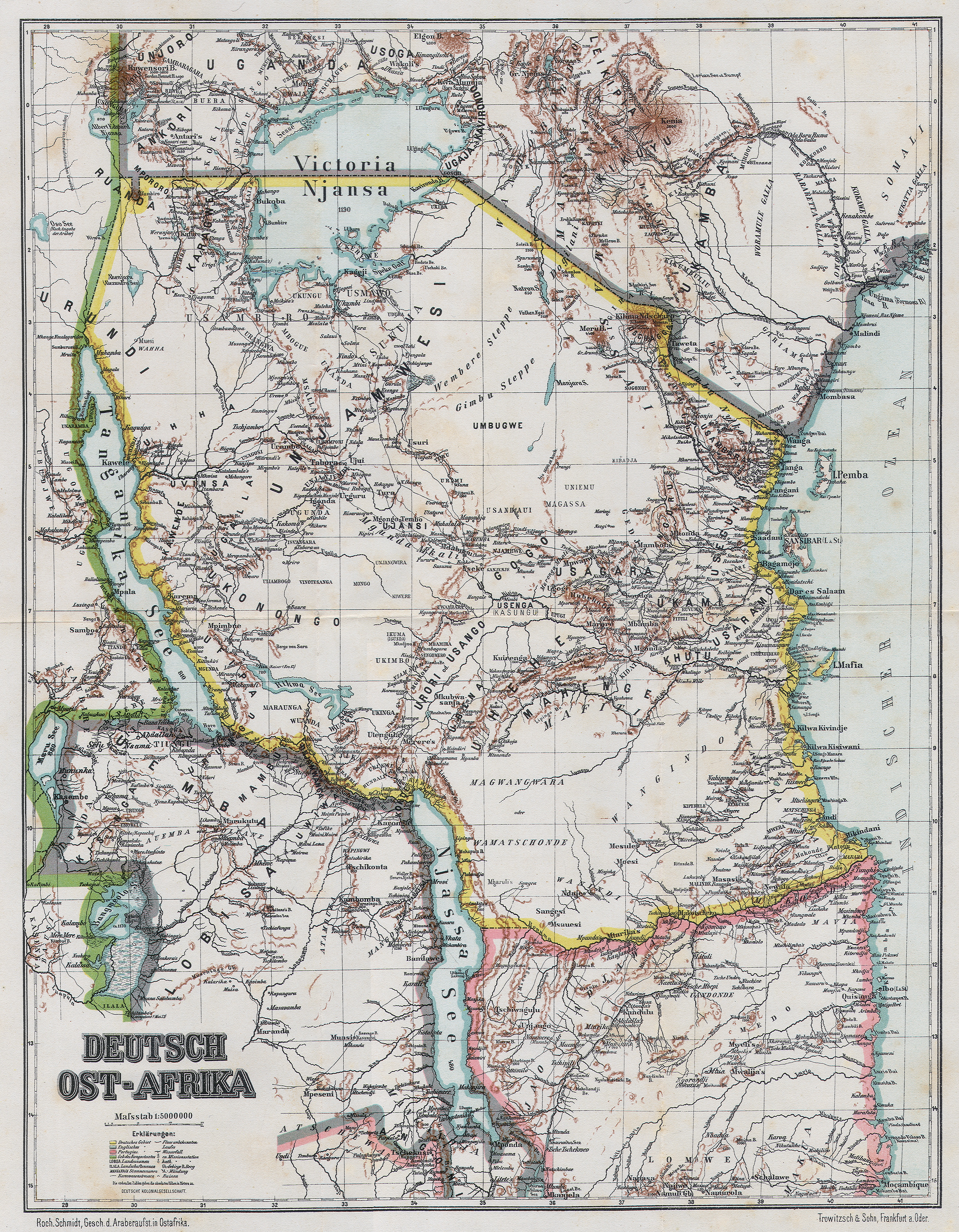
East Africa with colonial borders, map from 1893

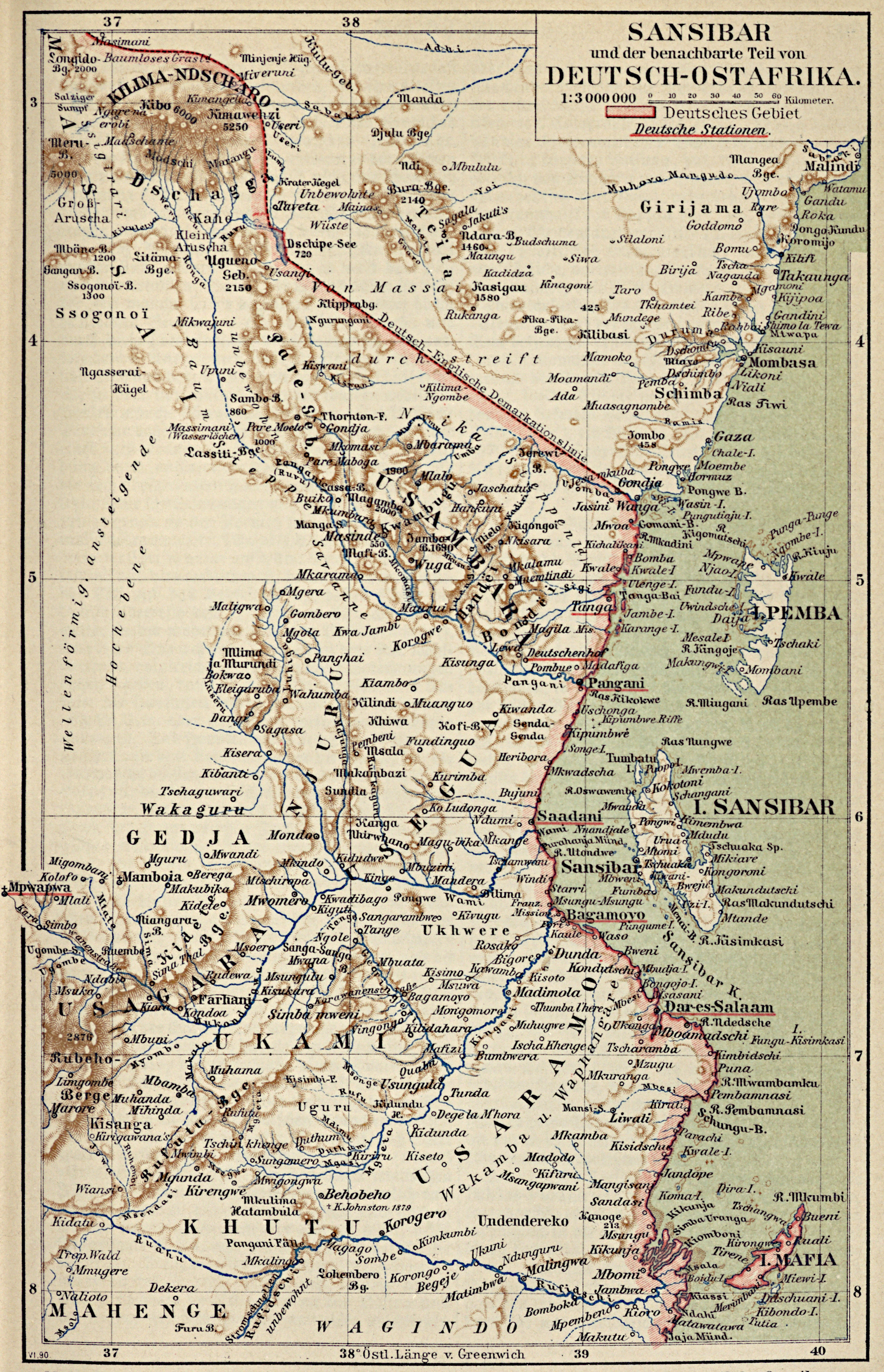
The coastal strips of East Africa with the islands of Zanzibar, Pemba, and Mafia in the foreground on a map from the early 20th century.

== Society, caravan culture, and trade in East Africa until 1800 ==
While the East African coast had been known for centuries under the name of the Coast of Ajan and incorporated into the Indian Ocean trade network, there are very few written sources providing information about the societies of the East African interior before the 19th century. It is clear, however, that this was a small and flexible social model in which political power was organized in a decentralized manner, distributed among councils of elders, ritual leaders, and warriors. Slavery and personal dependency were widespread, but this was a form of slavery that allowed a relative degree of economic independence for slaves and the possibility of rising to higher social ranks. Alongside political and family relations, trade and long-distance trading journeys created a network that fostered contact between various societies and largely shaped their mutual knowledge. Ethnic identities played almost no role in commercial relations, because societies were not structured along ethnic borders but were multiethnic due to slavery and high political flexibility.

It is not well known how far the trade networks extended inland or how they overlapped. Coastal towns had long maintained close trading relations with territories in the immediate hinterland of the coastal strip. These relations were dominated by inland merchants and elephant hunters, who used various strategies to prevent coastal traders from traveling inland. Through attacks on coastal travelers or spreading rumors of cannibalism and monsters, they managed, until the beginning of the 19th century, to maintain their position as intermediaries for the exchange of goods between the interior and the coast and to control prices. Until that time, goods from the interior reached the coast exclusively through these intermediary merchants. Coastal merchants did not make the journeys themselves.

Further inland, in central Tanganyika, trade networks also developed, maintaining relations with the merchants of the coastal hinterland and creating connections as far as the Congo, Bunyoro, and Buganda. For trading journeys, several merchants would gather to form a caravan. Goods were transported exclusively by human porters. Items sold included natron, iron, copper, cattle, hides, cereals, and pottery.

Ivory was considered a lesser category of merchandise, reaching the coast via intermediary merchants. The main buyers were Indian traders. In India, ivory was valued as jewelry, which women received upon marriage as a symbol of marital status. Since such jewelry was also buried upon a woman’s death, there was a constant, virtually unchanging demand for ivory from East Africa.

Another export product from East Africa was slaves, who were transported from the East African coast to many states bordering the Indian Ocean. Toward the end of the 18th century, demand increased due to labor needs on the sugar plantations of Mauritius and Réunion, leading to intensified trade. By this period, the southern Swahili coast exported anywhere from several hundred to several thousand slaves per year.

The expansion of trade led to a substantial extension of various networks toward the end of the 18th century, as merchants sought new markets and opportunities for profit. Around 1800, two elephant hunters from central Tanzania, in search of new trading partners, arrived on the East African coast opposite Zanzibar. In this way, the trade networks of the coast and the interior became connected.

== East Africa and Oman: political and economic power ==
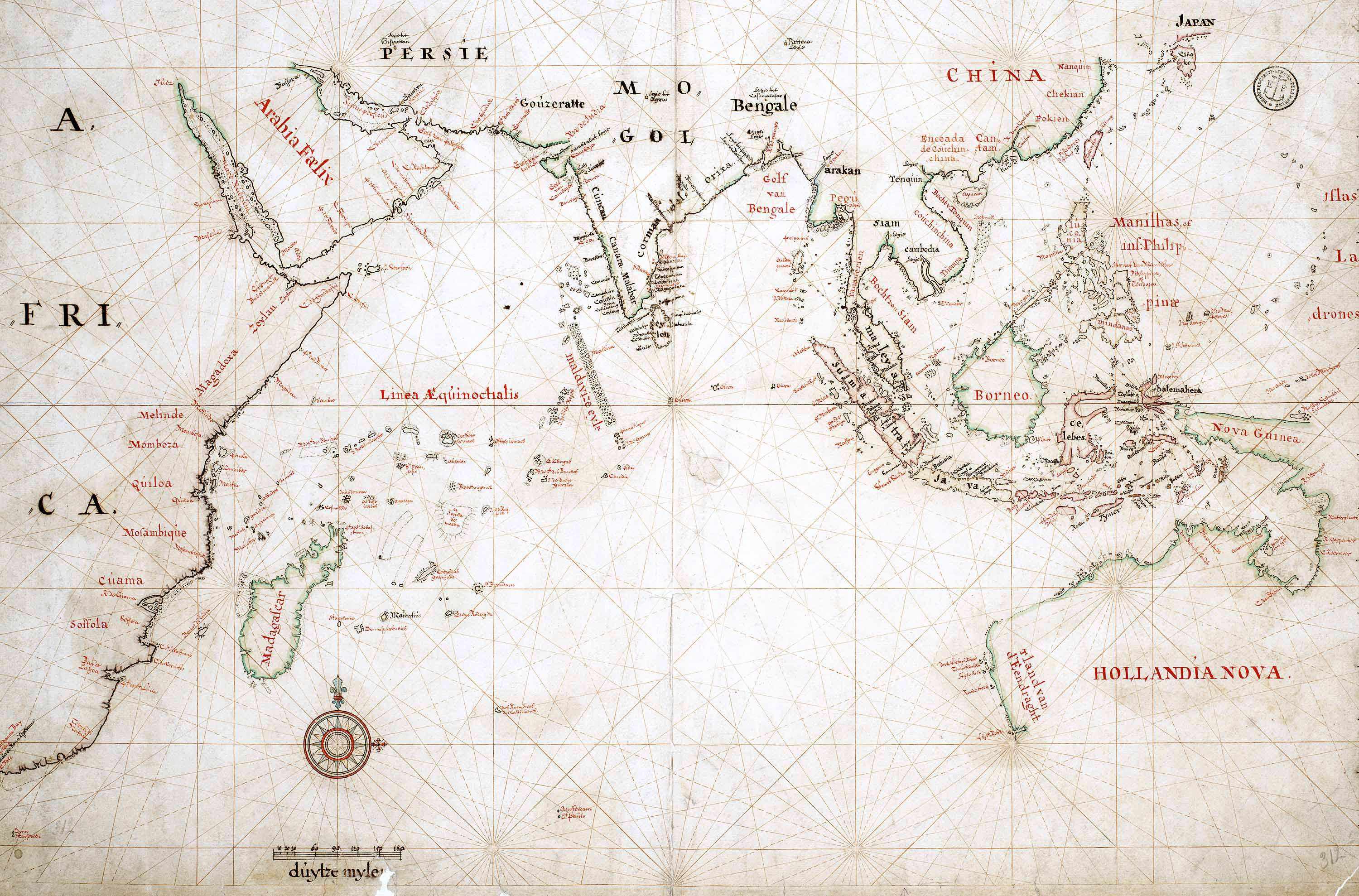
The Indian Ocean on a 17th-century map. On the coast, the cities of Mombasa and Kilwa, as well as the islands of Zanzibar, Pemba, and Mafia.

The towns of the East African coast had cultivated contacts for centuries not only with societies of the interior but also with territories bordering the Indian Ocean, including India, Iran, Mozambique, and Ethiopia. Particularly close ties existed with the Arab states of the Near East. Influential dynasties from Oman had, since the 17th century, played an important role along the East African coast. The center of their power there was the city of Mombasa.

Since the beginning of the 19th century, Omani landowners had successfully cultivated clove trees and sugarcane on Zanzibar, and the corresponding need for labor strongly stimulated an additional slave trade. After the export of ivory, which had gone mainly to India, was redirected toward the ports of Mozambique, the ivory trade took place primarily on the northern parts of the East African coast, in the regions opposite the islands of Mafia, Zanzibar, and Pemba. The concentration of trade on the coastal area between Mombasa and Kilwa thus coincided with the connection of trade networks deep into the interior of East Africa.

Eventually, these developments met with a growing demand for ivory. In addition, world market prices rose for oils, which were produced in East Africa in the form of coconuts and sesame, as well as for copal, used in the production of paints. Cloves, sugar, oils, copal, and ivory promised large profits, but until the early decades of the 19th century, these products continued to be brought to the coast by inland merchants, who controlled the trade.

== Zanzibar, seat of the sultan of Oman ==
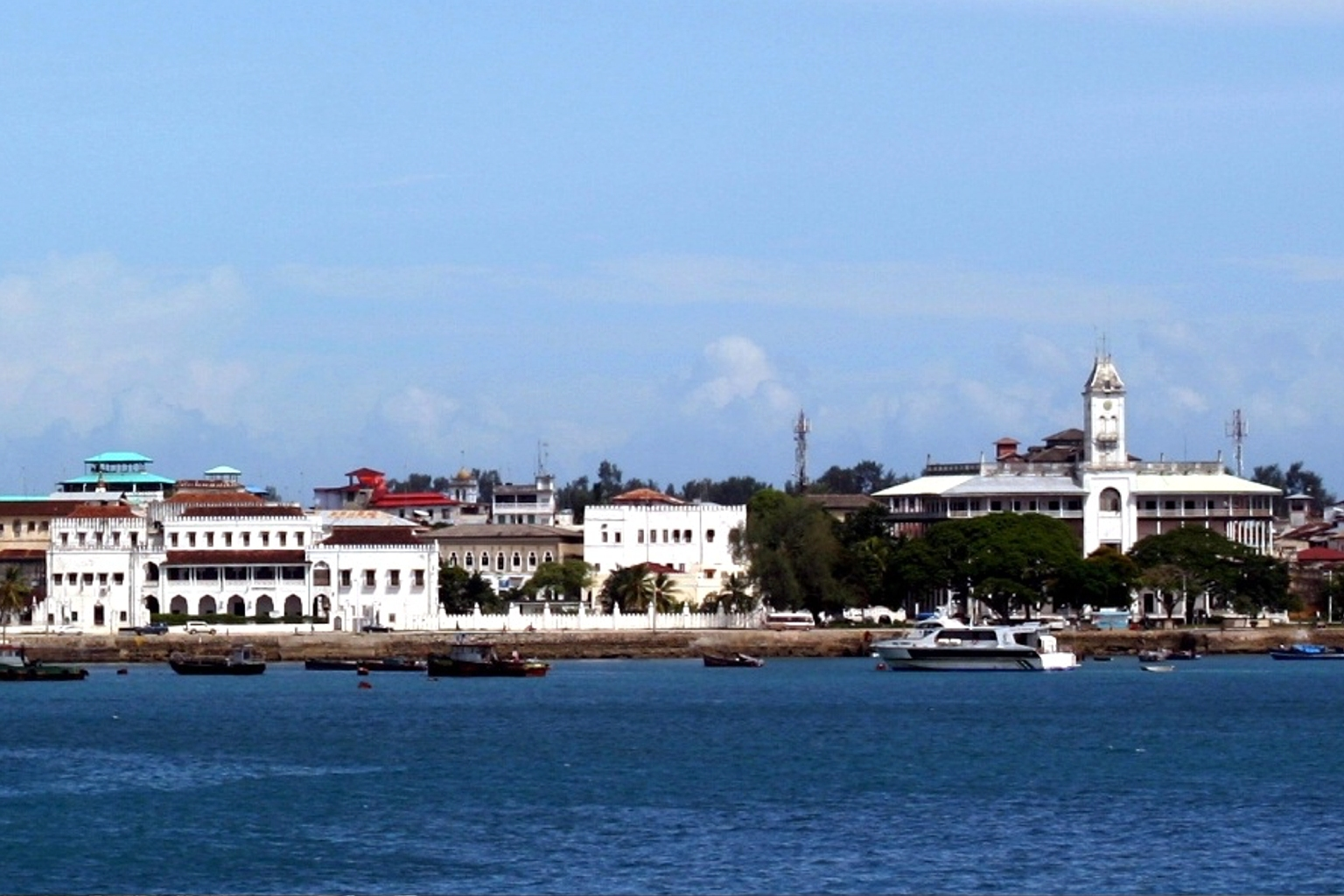
The port area of Zanzibar City in 2007; on the left is the Sultan's Palace, built after the Sultan moved to Zanzibar, and on the right is the power station built in 1883, called Beit al-Ajaib, or “House of Wonders” in popular parlance.

A crucial political—and consequently economic—change occurred between 1830 and 1850. Zanzibar, the center of an economic boom then emerging, gradually attracted the interest of Asian and European powers. The United Kingdom and France viewed the island as an important strategic foothold to assert their influence in the western Indian Ocean. Trading houses from Bombay with substantial capital, which had long maintained relations with the royal house of Oman and were involved in the East African ivory trade, opened branches, and many Indian merchants willing to take risks settled in the city. In the 1830s and 1840s, trading houses from Europe and America also established branches, notably the Hamburg firms Hansing & Co. and O'swald & Co.

In 1832, the royal house of Oman took account of this development: the ruling dynasty of the Sa‘id of Oman moved its seat from Muscat to Zanzibar, thus taking the place of the dynasties seated in Mombasa, which until then had represented Omani influence on the East African coast. Zanzibar became, under the authority of the Imam of Muscat, Sultan Sa‘id bin Sultan al-Busa‘id, the political, economic, and cultural center of East Africa.

With the relocation of the regent, many other wealthy families from regions bordering the Indian Ocean also moved, both to the islands and to the coastal strips of the mainland, establishing themselves as plantation owners. Sultan Sa‘id himself owned large clove plantations on Zanzibar and Pemba, whose maintenance depended on slave labor, and he supported the creation of additional clove fields on the islands. Alongside cloves, there were also large sugarcane plantations. The demand for plantation workers, and therefore for slaves, increased enormously. Spices, slaves, sugar, and ivory promised great profits. By around 1850, approximately 200,000 inhabitants of Zanzibar were slaves, probably more than half of the population.

The power of the Sultan of Oman was not limited to the islands of Zanzibar, Mafia, and Pemba. The ruler of Oman extended his influence over the coastal strips between Tanga and Kilwa, and a tax-collection administration emerged, through which the sultan enabled merchants within his sphere of influence to benefit from trade. The limits of his influence, however, were not clearly defined, and the loyalty of the coastal towns was constantly subject to negotiation. The sultan did not possess military means to extend his authority inland.

== Zanzibar, cosmopolitan center of East Africa ==
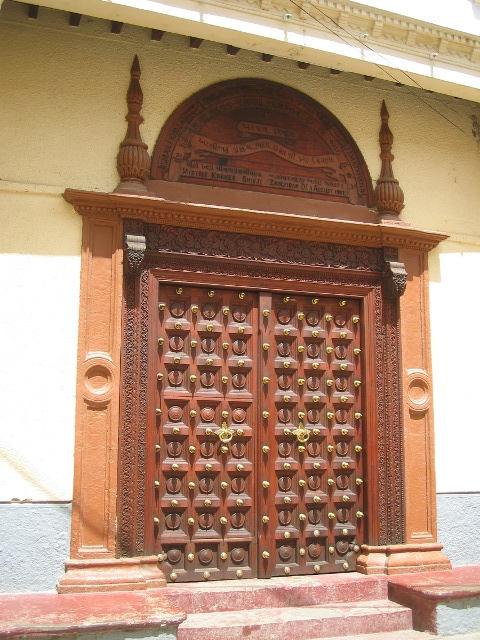
One of the typical carved doors in the historic old town of Zanzibar City

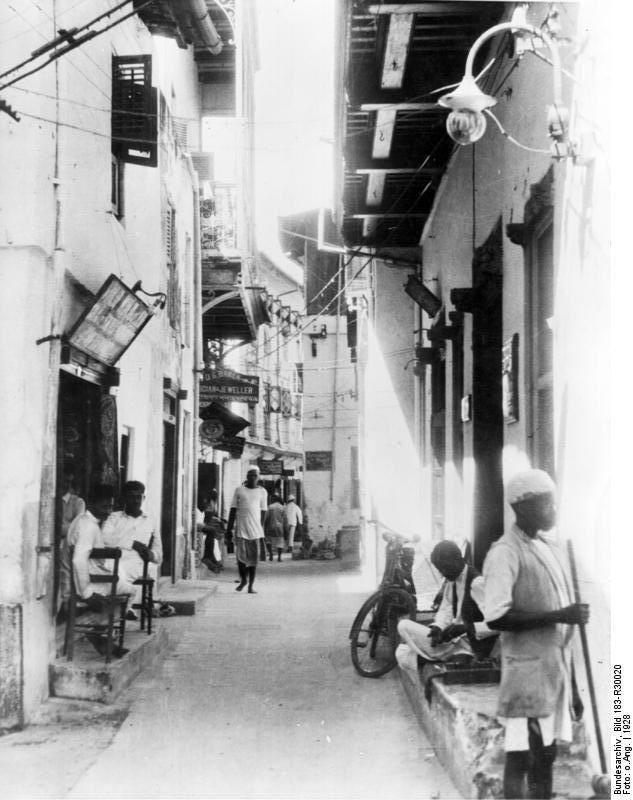
The old Arab town of Zanzibar, founded in the second half of the 19th century. Photo from 1928.

The population of Zanzibar reflected the diverse influences on the island and the varied relations of its inhabitants. Arabs from Oman and Hadramawt, Indians, Comorians, and Africans from various interior regions lived there, primarily engaged in caravan trade. In addition, there were slaves from the interior, who also had a significant influence on coastal developments.

Immigrants also brought their religions and cultural practices with them. Indian merchants were mostly Hindus. Islam experienced a renewal, attributable to immigrants from Hadramawt and the Comoros. Among them were numerous Muslim scholars, who made Zanzibar a center of Islamic learning. Whereas on the coast Islam had been defined by orality, status, and religious purity, the new Islam was based on writing, ties to the global Islamic world that was in the process of modernizing, and a largely egalitarian social model.

A rapidly expanding urban center, with multi-story stone houses, pushed the typical Swahili houses of the time to the edge of the city. Zanzibar became a cosmopolitan melting pot, exerting strong attraction and substantially shaping cultural and religious trends.

== Impulses for the Ivory trade ==
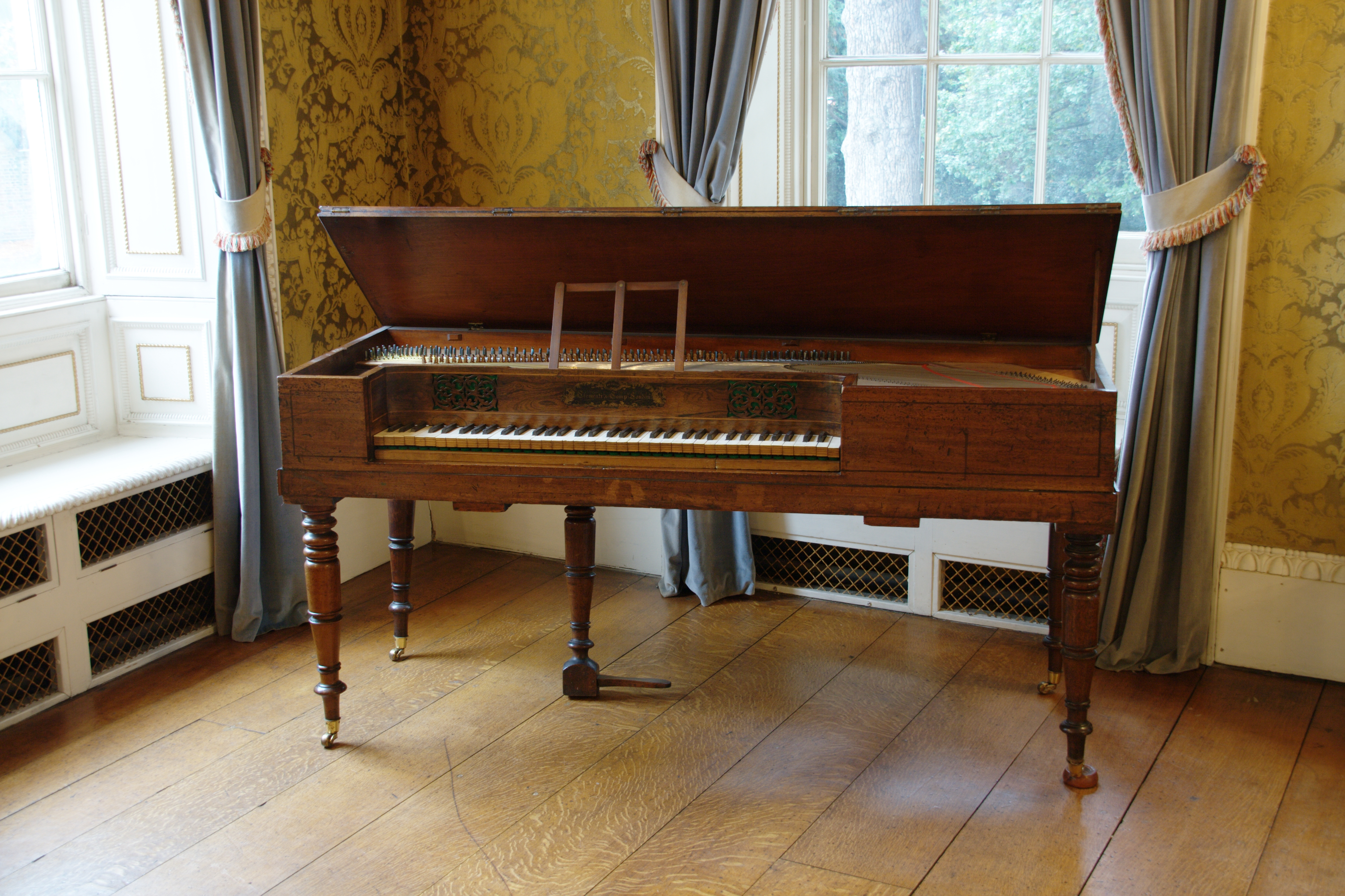
Piano keys were one of the many uses of East African ivory.

=== Global market demand ===
The decisive impetus for the ivory trade was the rapidly increasing price of ivory on the world market. The growing prosperity of bourgeois households in Europe and America increased the demand for ivory, which was used to manufacture musical instruments, billiard balls, false teeth, chess pieces, cane handles, devotional objects, jewelry, and other luxury items. A frasil (about 36 pounds) of ivory cost 21 Indian rupees, about 23 dollars, in 1825; by the 1870s, the price had tripled.

At the same time, industrialization stabilized the prices of cotton textiles, brass wire, and muskets imported from Europe into East Africa, and in some cases even lowered them. For this reason, the profits from ivory exports rose steadily, and from around 1825 ivory became East Africa’s most valuable export product, a status it retained until the end of the century.

=== Trade policy of the state of Zanzibar ===
The profits promised by the ivory and slave trades profoundly changed traditional trade structures. Coastal merchants then aspired to monopolize and control profits. This was best achieved by bypassing inland intermediaries and traveling inland themselves to bring back to the coast the precious ivory and slaves.

The sultans of Zanzibar contributed decisively to this development, striving to provide the best possible infrastructure for trade. Sultan Sa‘id saw commerce as a dynamic social force and said of himself that he “was nothing more than a merchant.” Trade, alongside the plantation economy, was the most important source of revenue for the State of Zanzibar. The sultans pursued an active tax policy and created incentives for the immigration of new Arab merchants.

By appointing Indian merchants as tax collectors, they directly linked Indian capital to the State of Zanzibar. In this way, financially powerful financiers were placed at the disposal of merchants.

However, the sultan did not have military means to secure caravan routes inland for coastal merchants. Instead, he equipped them with letters of recommendation for their journeys inland. Reactions to these letters varied greatly, ranging from the granting of requested support to complete disregard.

Above all, what mattered was the connection of Zanzibar merchants to the trade networks of the Indian Ocean, America, and Europe. Zanzibar became the center of an East African trade network and a logistical hub for caravan trade: imports from Arabia and India were transshipped in Zanzibar before reaching the various ports of East Africa, while ivory and slave exports were brought to Zanzibar, from where they were resold to India, Arabia, the ivory markets of London and Antwerp, and the islands of the Indian Ocean.

== Establishment of interregional trade by caravan ==
Even if the State of Zanzibar was willing to stimulate trade, it was ultimately the initiative of private individuals—on whose interests and efforts the emerging commercial network was based—that drove it. Zanzibar and other coastal towns with their caravanserais became logistical centers. It was there that caravans were financed and equipped, porters recruited, goods for exchange in the interior offered, and merchandise arriving in abundance from the interior purchased.

=== Business structures of caravan trade ===
==== Trading houses ====
European and Indian trading companies, through their global networks and their branches in Zanzibar, connected the local exchange of goods with world trade. They organized the import of exchange goods and the export of ivory.

==== Financiers ====
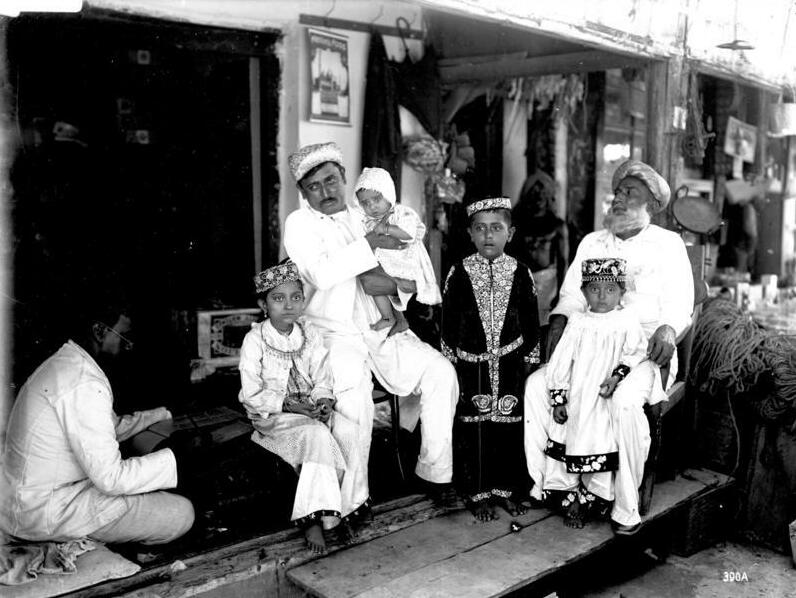
An Indian merchant family in East Africa in a photograph from the early 20th century

The expensive caravan enterprises were almost exclusively financed by Indian financiers. Indian merchant dynasties, with long-distance ties throughout the Indian Ocean commercial network, relied on their close relations with the rulers of Oman, sometimes dating back to the 18th century. Strong capital links with influential trading houses in Bombay put them in a position to financially support risky ventures such as a caravan into the interior. It was through Indian merchants that the Indian rupee spread, which from around 1860, alongside the Maria Theresa thaler, became the widespread currency on the East African coast and was also established as the common currency along caravan routes. Loans could reach enormous sums; for example, for a caravan organized by the merchant Tippo Tip, a loan of 50,000 Maria Theresa thalers was granted.

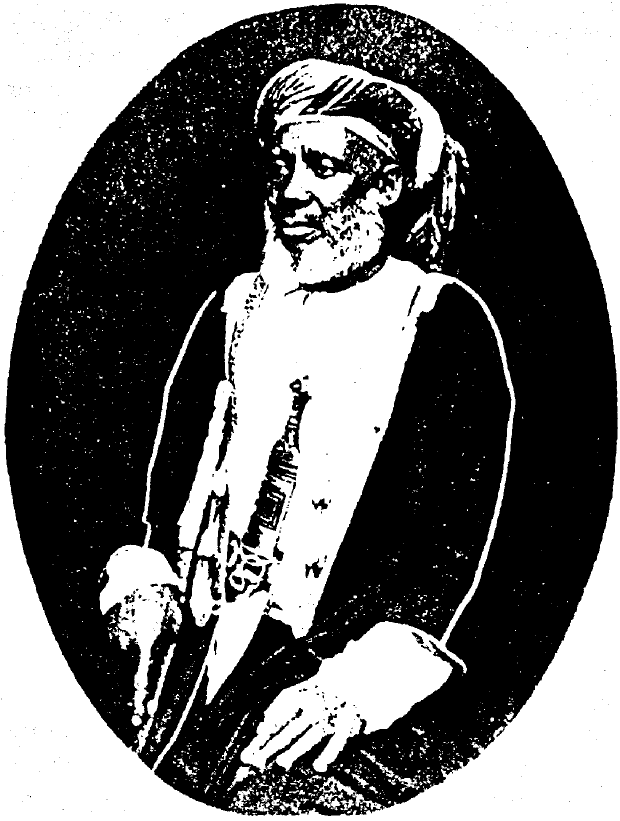
The Swahili caravan merchant Hamed bin Mohammed el Marjebi, known as Tippo Tip

Once support points were established along caravan routes—where Indian merchants set up branches and secondary residences—a system akin to banking developed, which allowed financial transactions between the interior and the coast, based on checks and letters of credit.

==== Caravan merchants ====
The borrowers and caravan merchants came largely from the coast and from Arabia. Often, their exact origins cannot be defined, as the composition of their families and their careers were so complex and multicultural, much like Swahili society itself.

It is believed that the first traders were two Indian merchants who traveled from the coast to the Nyamwezi. Musa Mzuri and his elder brother probably founded Tabora and other stations intended as trading branches in the interior; they linked Buganda and Karagwe to the previously known commercial network, and opened caravan routes for coastal merchants as far as eastern Congo.

The dangers and financial risks of a caravan journey were great. Merchants often incurred heavy debts, and if the expected profit did not materialize, they had to disappear into the interior. Because of such uncertainties, profit must have been an extremely compelling motivation. The caravan merchant Tippo Tip described another motive for undertaking these daring ventures: his father had begun trade journeys into the interior in the hope of living as a sultan among the Nyamwezi. Merchants often traveled with large retinues, numbering up to a thousand armed men, and were therefore able in many places to enforce their interests. This also included opening trading branches and establishing secondary residences along trade routes.

Moreover, ivory trade was not solely in the hands of coastal merchants. Africans from the interior, some of whom had previously gone to the coast as slaves or independent traders, organized their own caravans. In addition, the businesses of interior merchants continued to thrive, assembling caravans inland and transporting slaves and ivory to the coast.

=== Caravan routes ===
In their journeys, coastal merchants used already existing caravan routes of local trading systems. The novelty of their enterprises was that they passed through the paths of different commercial networks, thereby linking them together.

From the first half of the 19th century, four major caravan routes were established, all leading from coastal towns into the interior. From Kilwa and Lindi in the southern part of the coast, a route led to Lake Malawi, a journey that required a month for caravans. From Bagamoyo, opposite Zanzibar, a route led through Ugogo to Tabora among the Nyamwezi in central Tanganyika, and then further to Ujiji on Lake Tanganyika. Caravans needed 90 days for this journey of about 1,300 km. From there, other routes led to eastern Congo.

Another caravan path ran from Pangani and Tanga to Kilimanjaro, where it split into routes leading to Lake Victoria and the region between the Great Lakes on one side, and to Mount Kenya on the other. Finally, one route went from Mombasa to Mount Kenya, and from there further to Lake Turkana.

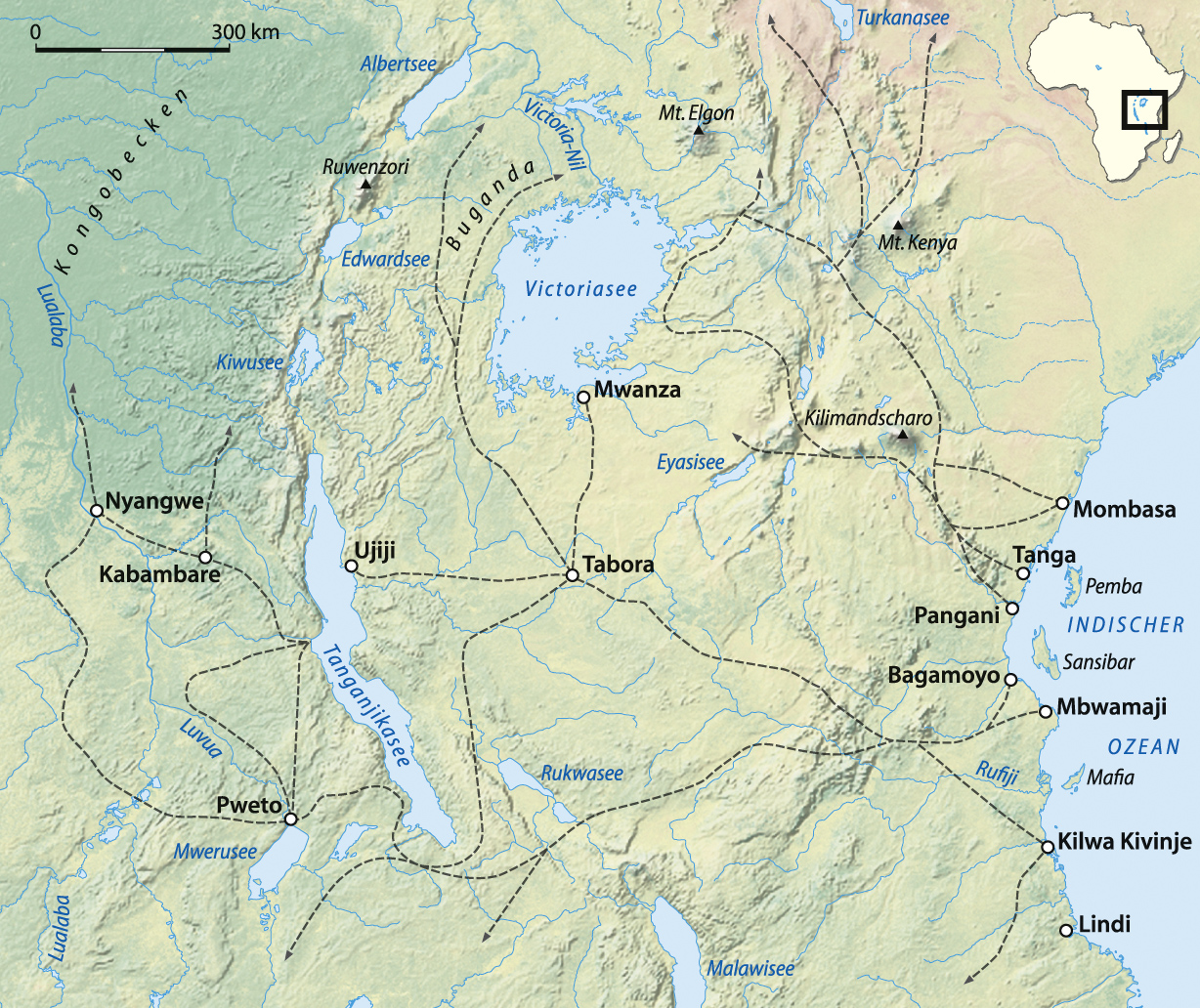
Caravan routes in East Africa in the 19th century

Since the influence of the sultan inland at the beginning of commercial activities played virtually no role, and later was limited to the larger towns along the routes, merchants had to explore and develop commercial structures on their own initiative. For this, the knowledge of experienced interior traders was invaluable. Caravans departed from the caravanserais of coastal towns and largely followed already known and used routes. Along caravan paths, a series of Swahili trading posts were created, which were essential for long-term trade survival. It was necessary to supply caravans of 5,000 people or more with food and drinking water and to protect them from attacks during the journey. These support points made caravan routes viable. They could not be established against the will of local populations and were often preceded by long negotiations with local chiefs. Once a station was established, it served caravans as a resting place and a site to resume trade.

Whereas at the beginning of trade, ivory could be bought in large quantities in regions relatively close to the coast, reachable in four weeks, travel times grew longer and longer, as the elephant population declined due to intensive hunting. New, more distant regions were opened by merchants in their search for ivory.

=== Ethnicization of inland inhabitants ===
In the effort of coastal merchants to organize the unknown interior into coherent categories, a large number of concepts for regions and population groups emerged. The inland population was extremely heterogeneous; in addition, present-day Tanzania was affected by many waves of immigration due to events in southern Africa. The inland societies were neither ethnically nor linguistically homogeneous. Rather, there existed many relatively small, politically flexible units tied to local identities or a common patriarch. Coastal merchants tried to counter this heterogeneity, which they could not clarify, by dividing the inland inhabitants according to their own concepts.

This gave rise to the concept of the Nyamwezi, which grouped together various Bantu-speaking groups of central Tanzania. By this term (translated as “People of the Moon”), merchants designated the reliable porters from the distant interior. Gradually, people from this region began to call themselves Nyamwezi, since many advantages could be linked to caravan trade: the prospect of employment, better pay, and improved treatment. One could not truly speak of the Nyamwezi as an ethnicity, not least because of the many slaves coming from other regions.

In a similar way, there were also general designations for human groups from other regions.

=== Building trade contacts ===
For coastal merchants, establishing trade contacts inland was a long-term, complicated, and sometimes highly dangerous task. In the worldview of Muslim merchants, who saw themselves as part of a cultivated world religion, the people living in the East African interior were pagan savages, dangerous, brutal in their customs, and primitive in culture. This was expressed in the Swahili term Washenzi, “savages,” for the interior population. The centuries-old tradition of buying and enslaving people from the interior—even on a small scale—was based on this worldview.

At the same time, coastal merchants depended on these very people when traveling inland. They had to negotiate with inhabitants in order to pass through their territories with their giant caravans, to purchase food, to gain access to water points, to find lodging, and to ensure that caravans were not attacked. Good relations with local tribal chiefs greatly facilitated the purchase of supplies. For all this, constant negotiations were necessary, and distrust and conflicts always complicated relations on both sides.

==== Cultural intermediaries ====
For these negotiations, intermediaries were necessary: individuals who were familiar with the interior, who mastered the local languages, could explain the customs and traditions, and who knew the political and economic relations of the region. The central questions for the merchants were: who ruled the concerned territory, who had control of the ivory trade, and how the prices were established. On the other hand, it was important to know what could be provided in terms of drinking water and food supplies, and to what extent political relations could be considered stable.

Chiefs of the interior also had advisors and cultural intermediaries at their side, coming from the world of caravan trade, such as former merchants or slaves from the interior who had reached the coast and were therefore familiar both with coastal society and with their society of origin.

==== Blood brotherhood ====
Because of insecurity in the interior, an important diplomatic strategy of coastal merchants was to establish secure contacts with the chiefs of inland societies through blood brotherhoods. Blood brotherhood was a widespread practice throughout East Africa to form a secure and reliable form of kinship. However, blood brotherhoods had different meanings depending on the region and did not everywhere guarantee relations analogous to kinship; in particular, they lost importance in areas where they had been concluded extensively.

==== Kinship ====
Marriages also created kinship relations, although coastal merchants considered marriage possible only between people of equal rank, and thus excluded in principle such unions with chiefs of the interior. However, Swahili merchants did, in many places, marry the daughters of local chiefs. The institution of polygynous marriage, shared across all East African societies, allowed merchants to establish themselves in several regions through marriage, cemented by kinship ties.

The political leaders of the interior were also interested in such relations. Both sides were engaged: merchants could count on the support of their in-laws, and conversely, slave raids or the use of military violence to establish commercial interests in the regions of such relatives could take place only with their consent.

=== Merchandise ===
While ivory was the commodity to be brought to the coast and sold there, determining everything, coastal merchants were also interested in other goods. On the one hand, slaves were a profitable commodity, as they were in high demand on the coast as labor; on the other hand, by the late 19th century, rubber, which was found in large quantities particularly in the Congo, fetched good prices on the East African coast.

For their part, coastal merchants brought with them on their journeys inland a wide range of trade goods. In the interior, the most valued goods were especially firearms, as well as sugar produced on the East African coast. In addition, cotton textiles, glass beads, brass and copper wire were brought in large quantities, goods whose production costs were constantly lowered in the 19th century by industrialization in Europe and America, which increased profits. Beads, brass, and wire were painstakingly transformed into jewelry by local goldsmiths. Cotton textiles represented a prized clothing style, contributing to high regard through their imitation of coastal dress. Fabrics, metals, and beads also served as dowries and increasingly functioned as a form of currency in the interior. The goods that reached the interior were therefore primarily prestige items, contributing on the one hand to reputation, prestige, and social rank, and on the other to the purchase of women and livestock, and to prosperity. Furthermore, glass beads, for example, were an important status symbol for their wearer. Since 200 CE they had come from India, and between 600 and 1200 also from the south, from Mapungubwe in South Africa. Beads made from precious stones were in much higher demand than in Europe, where needs were gradually being met.

Finally, European luxury goods of all kinds were extremely sought after, such as umbrellas, watches, clothing, telescopes, and even furniture, whose value reached incommensurable levels due to their rarity in the interior.

== Caravans and caravan culture ==
Caravans, through their social composition and hierarchy, were a crucible for identities and cultures. Thousands of people—from the coast and from all regions of East Africa—met within them, spent weeks and months together in extreme conditions, had to present themselves together to the outside world, and often had to defend themselves, but also to share knowledge and negotiate positions. Caravans were therefore a moment of integration. Through work in the caravan, coastal people could attain positions in the interior that were closed to them on the coast; conversely, the caravan offered inland people the possibility of entering the respected status of member of Swahili society.

Work in caravans, and participation in caravan trade, therefore represented for many not only a profitable resource, but also an activity that elevated and confirmed personal standing. This was especially true for slaves, who could gain prosperity through work in caravans, and for some even escape their condition of dependence altogether. The boundaries between coastal merchants, who considered themselves culturally advanced, and the interior societies, which they labeled as savages—washenzi—were thus constantly in flux.

Although the impetus to develop the trade network into the interior came from coastal merchants, the longstanding caravan culture among groups in central East Africa contributed to shaping the form of this trade. Coastal merchants were actively supported by entrepreneurs and businessmen from the interior. During the expansion phase, coastal merchants decisively relied on their knowledge and experience, which led to the interregional caravan trade culture, dominated by the coast, being structured in form upon the commercial traditions inherited from the interior. The social structure and order of the caravan were essentially shaped by the form of Nyamwezi caravans, which constituted a large proportion of the porters in Swahili caravans.

=== Social structure of the caravan ===
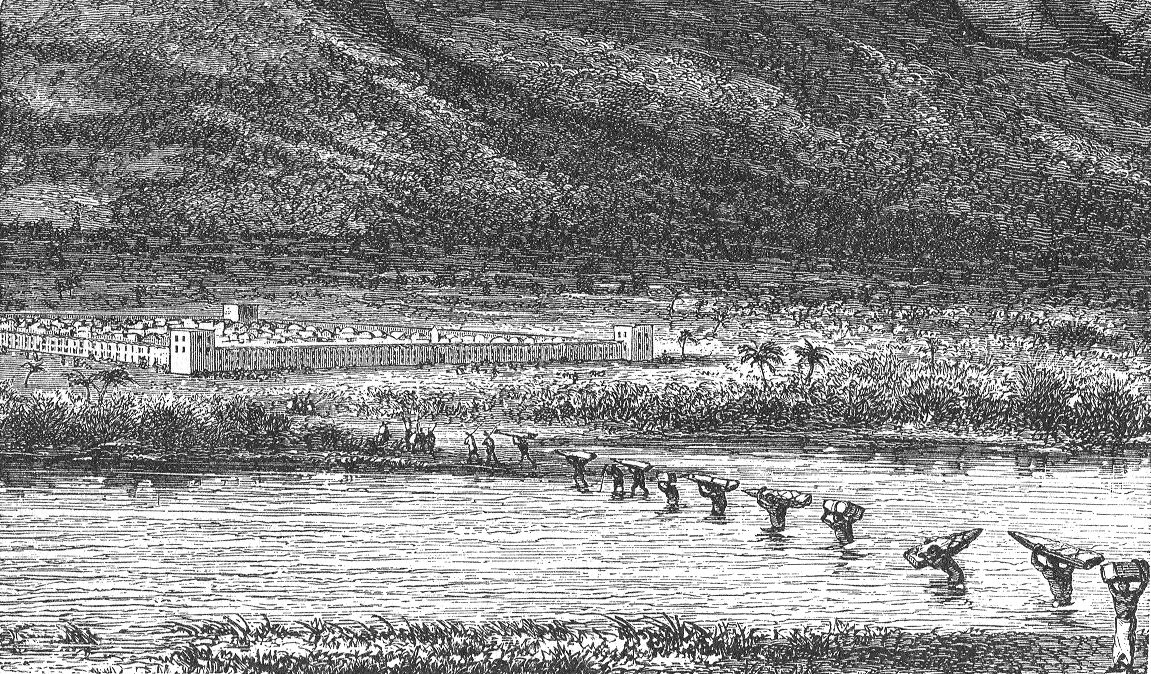
Illustration of a caravan in East Africa crossing a river

Caravans were not only major economic enterprises but also mobile social communities governed by a strict hierarchical order. This hierarchy was reflected in the organization of the march. At the head walked the kirongozi, a guide chosen by the porters, who, with a small entourage, formed the vanguard, selected the routes, and negotiated tolls for passage. Following them was the “aristocracy” of the caravan, which included the nyampara, the chief and spiritual guide of the caravan, dressed in ostentatious and ritual garments without carrying loads, as well as the merchants with their retinues and servants, who carried parasols and weapons. Then came the porters, arranged according to the goods they transported and always accompanied by armed men: ivory porters marched first, followed by those carrying trade goods such as cloth, beads, and copper wire, and finally those transporting the caravan’s equipment. Behind them came small independent traders, shackled slaves, women and children, the sick, tourists, and porters carrying lighter goods such as rhinoceros horns, tools, salt, tobacco, bags, sleeping mats, tents, water containers, and cooking pots. For specific tasks, there were cooks, healers, interpreters, and soldiers, as well as experienced specialists who guided the caravan through unfamiliar territories.

A caravan did not consist solely of entrepreneurs and the porters they employed. Independent traders from the interior often joined, negotiating ivory or other goods such as livestock or grain on their own account. Many women and children also traveled as relatives of servants, armed men, and porters.

==== Caravan leaders ====
Caravan leaders held significant authority and exercised disciplinary power within the caravan. They served both as ritual and social leaders. Their responsibilities included practical guidance, which required extensive geographical knowledge. They also needed to understand the cultural and political structures of the societies encountered along the route. Often multilingual, they mastered not only Swahili and Arabic but also other major vehicular languages used along their journeys. Leaders were also responsible for spiritual and ritual guidance, performing ceremonies intended to ward off misfortune and ensure the success of the expedition. They often possessed medicinal knowledge as well. Generally, caravan leaders came from the interior. Because of their experience and status, they were highly prestigious figures both within the caravan and in their home communities.

==== Porters ====
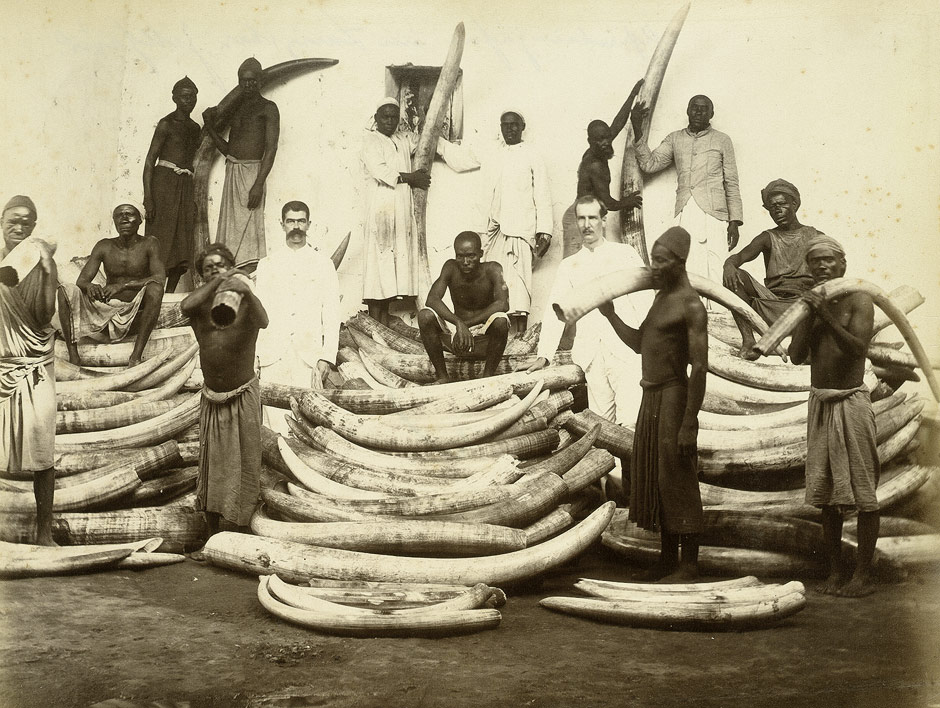
Caravan porters with ivory tusks. The porters wear cotton fabrics, which have become common clothing for porters. The men in the back row indicate their social status as Muslims and members of the coastal culture through their clothing.

Porters came from various social backgrounds. Among them were professionals, especially along the central route to Lake Tanganyika, who were employed for the entire journey between the interior and the coast, traveling seasonally in both directions. They were young men from either the interior or the coast, who could be free men or slaves. Some slaves were hired out by their owners and thus gained a degree of independence, while others traded on their own account, paying a portion of their earnings to their owners.

Professional porters were typically recruited through agencies in major caravan towns and contracted for the full route. Wages were negotiated at this stage. Their work was strictly regulated. They carried loads of 60 to 70 pounds for the caravan, in addition to their personal equipment such as a sleeping mat, utensils, food rations, tools, and weapons, and sometimes goods for their own trade. Altogether, a porter’s load could amount to about 90 pounds.

Professional porters were highly organized. As in their home communities, where they were hunters or craftsmen, they formed groups within the caravan that collectively arranged lodging and supplies during rest periods and represented their interests against the caravan elite. Disputes over pay, medical care, rest times, and protection during marches were not uncommon. Porters held a strong position; when they deserted, merchants suffered major financial losses and delays. In the second half of the 19th century, porters succeeded in obtaining increasingly better wages. For example, in 1871, a porter received a monthly wage of 2.5 Maria Theresa thalers (MTT), and only a few years later 5 or even 8 MTT, paid in coins, cloth, or brass or iron wire. In addition, they received food rations, either directly as provisions or as trade goods, in which case porters purchased their supplies along the way and could profit by negotiating prices.

Most professional porters worked for caravans for several years before returning to their homeland. Their earnings, along with their work and travel experiences, earned them respect. Thus, porter work and travel experience generally held central social value in many communities. In the early 1890s, historian Juhani Koponen estimated that about 100,000 porters were on East African routes annually. Since porter work contributed to prosperity and substantially raised social status, young men were encouraged to join caravans as porters or even to travel to the coast as caravan entrepreneurs on their own account. Among the Nyamwezi, the journey became a rite of passage into manhood, considered a prerequisite for marriage. Often, men who reached the coast for the first time with a caravan changed their names to signify their new social status.

==== Mercenaries and armed escorts ====
For the hierarchy of the caravan, the armed retinue accompanying the merchants was also important. It represented the merchants’ private troop in the interior. Its purpose was, on the one hand, to protect the members of the caravan and to ensure that the valuable goods were not stolen. On the other hand, it was established to maintain discipline among the porters in case of desertion or mutiny. Disputes within the caravan were quite frequent when porters demanded better pay, improved food, or lighter loads.

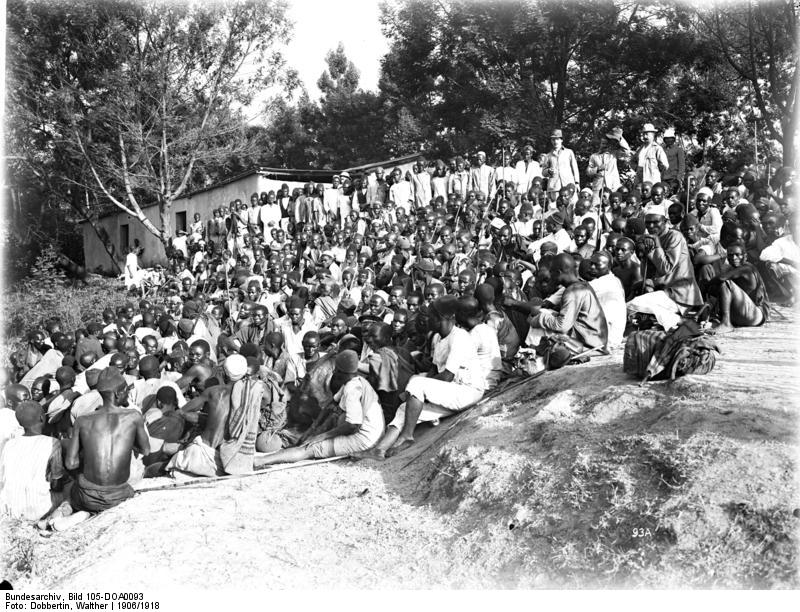
East African workers, between 1906 and 1918

The armed men were mercenaries from all parts of the country, who had previously gained experience as caravan porters or caravan escorts. They were equipped with modern weapons by the merchants and received military training. Most of the time, they were very young men, sometimes even children, as in the military retinue of Tippo Tip, who joined him between the ages of 10 and 18 and on whose unconditional loyalty the merchant could rely. Over time, these mercenaries became increasingly professionalized and became known as Ruga-Ruga. Equipped with weapons and clothing that identified them as men of prestige, they were highly mobile and attached themselves on their own initiative to chiefs or merchants who offered them the greatest benefits. Others organized themselves into military units and, on the basis of their military strength, established their own domains, such as under the leadership of Mirambo, who, from being the son of a minor ntemi (chief) in Unyamwesi, became one of the most powerful men in the interior.

==== Women ====
Women also always traveled with the caravans. Many of them were relatives, wives, slaves, or concubines of porters or other caravan members. In any case, they formed an auxiliary labor force. They helped with loads by carrying items needed by the porters or soldiers and took care of food preparation during rest periods. Apparently, there were also women who joined the journey on their own initiative. Women on the margins of their home society—unmarried, childless, or otherwise vulnerable at a time of intensive slave trading, which was especially dangerous for them—found in the caravan community a form of social protection. The caravan offered poorly married women a chance to escape their marriage, and fugitive slaves found independence within it. Some women were hired as porters, others made a living from small-scale individual trade, brewing beer, working as cooks, or offering sexual services.

== Effects of caravan trade in the African interior ==
=== Political changes ===
In the second half of the 19th century, the rapidly expanding caravan trade brought about profound changes in East African societies. Competition for the ever-increasing profits of caravan trade led in many regions to greater social insecurity, war, political instability, and the emergence of warlords.

==== Centralization of political power ====
Politics and trade were closely connected. In many interior societies, which had traditionally been organized on a decentralized political basis, individuals managed to centralize and expand their political influence. This was the case among the Nyamwezi with the ntemi, who until then, as ritual leaders, had shared power with councils of elders. Traditionally, they were entitled to a share of all game; in the case of elephants, they received the tusks (or at least one tusk from each elephant killed), which had a purely symbolic value. The ivory was stored; among the Kamba, tusks were erected as entrance posts to the courtyards of prominent men, while in other regions they were buried as protective totems. In contact with coastal merchants, this custom revealed itself as a material advantage: the ntemi were the first to part with their stores of ivory to the coastal traders. Through the sale of ivory, they obtained unprecedented quantities of prestige goods, including firearms, which later proved highly useful in consolidating their power.

The coastal merchants were interested in the centralization of power and supported it militarily insofar as local leaders showed themselves to be cooperative. With clear divisions of authority, access to ivory was made easier for them, since it became clear with whom they had to confer and negotiate. Through alliances with these political forces, coastal merchants could increase their commercial profits with the interior. The influence of merchants, with their military and economic potential, increasingly became an important factor in the political relations of inland societies. They supported leaders who were good trading partners and, in many places, involved themselves in local politics in order to weaken or overthrow rulers who did not cooperate with them.

==== Commercial leaders ====
Some individuals also came to power without previously having had any political influence, building it instead on their experience in the caravan trade. In general, these were people who had worked in caravan commerce and had acquired both wealth and weapons through it. The growing number of firearms entering the interior through trade each year contributed particularly to this development. By the 1880s, as many as 100,000 weapons were already being imported annually into the interior.

These men, referred to in research as commercial leaders—among them Mirambo—adapted the practices of caravan merchants by gathering around themselves groups of young warriors, often men who had previously been porters, caravan leaders, prisoners of war, or enslaved individuals active in caravan trade. These recruits often already possessed weapons as payment for their past work, or were armed by their leaders. In this way, an armed following was assembled around a leader, establishing his power over regions crossed by caravans.

Because of their military equipment and their knowledge of trade and its structures, which extended far beyond local conditions, they succeeded in building new domains based on new political structures. Unlike traditional societies, political power rested almost exclusively in the hands of young men, who ruled with a level of violence previously unknown. Slave raids, in which captives were sold to coastal merchants, and raids against societies where ivory was accumulated, formed the economic foundation of these emerging powers.

==== Slave trade ====
In inland societies, the enslavement of prisoners of war was a common practice, since people, along with their labor and reproductive capacity, promised economic gain. Such slaves were incorporated into the household in the next generation and thus contributed to its prosperity. With the establishment of trade relations with the coast, this practice changed. Many of the enslaved were then sold to coastal merchants, where they were used as labor and represented a source of quick revenue for the interior. This led to increasingly frequent raids with the aim of capturing as many slaves as possible in order to resell them.

=== Economic consequences of trade ===
The high profits brought by the ivory trade, along with the millions of people integrated into the rapidly forming commercial system, led many other economic sectors to become increasingly oriented toward this trade. Agricultural production in the interior was more and more directed toward supplying the caravans. Herdsmen drove cattle over distances of more than 1,000 kilometers to the coast to profit from the high food prices there. The new mobility created by the intense caravan traffic meant change in several respects. Workers employed in the trade were no longer available for local economies. Increasingly, women had to take over work previously performed by men, while enslaved individuals could enter new areas of activity and thus achieve social mobility.

==== Professionalization of porter labor ====
Whereas livestock raising and agriculture had constituted the main economic foundations of inland societies up to the 19th century, by the middle of the century at the latest, ivory trade had become the determining component of the economy. This was reflected in the direct participation of many people in trade. On the one hand, they organized caravans to the coast themselves; on the other hand, they worked as porters. If previously trade had been a secondary activity practiced by only a small part of society, many men and women were then involved—by around 1890, about one third of the male Nyamwezi population. The historian from Zanzibar Abdul Sheriff has described this phenomenon as a proletarianization of porters. At the same time, the income of porters contributed to the accumulation of wealth in their home societies. Their earnings were largely exchanged for livestock and additional wives, which further contributed to the prosperity of the regional economy.

==== Professionalization of elephant hunting ====
In addition, trade had an indirect impact on the local economy. Elephant hunting became an increasingly important branch of the economy. Coastal merchants did not hunt themselves, but they purchased available ivory or outfitted groups of hunters who undertook hunting campaigns.

In other regions, further from caravan routes, societies had no direct contact with coastal merchants. However, intermediaries transmitted the growing demand for ivory to them. In these regions, ivory prices rose quickly, leading to the formation of professional groups of elephant hunters.

==== Population growth ====
All of these factors contributed to a growing imbalance in economic development, toward an economy that was increasingly unsustainable. The wealth that could be accumulated through trade concentrated in a shrinking segment of the population. Food supplies diminished and no longer provided security during threatening droughts.

Diseases represented a dangerous obstacle to demographic development. Not only mobility, but also wars and the resulting concentration of populations in large, fortified settlements led to faster spread of contagious diseases. Caravan members were often infected with smallpox, likely virulent Asian or European strains, against which little immunity existed. Cholera and venereal diseases were widespread. The concentration of people in large settlements led to the abandonment of vast areas, facilitating the spread of the tsetse fly and, consequently, sleeping sickness. Gonorrhea, which presents mild symptoms, led to sterility in many women and was likely the main cause of low birth rates from the 1870s onward.

==== Decline of elephant populations ====
The consequences of trade at its peak ultimately included a dramatic decline in elephant populations throughout East Africa. By the 1880s, three-quarters of the world’s ivory trade was supplied by East African ivory, representing the hunting of 40,000 to 60,000 animals. The “elephant frontier” thus continually receded further inland, gains became increasingly difficult, and caravan merchants had to undertake ever longer journeys to satisfy ever-growing demand.

=== Cultural transfer ===
Interregional trade, which involved large parts of the East African population, also produced a series of significant cultural changes. Inland populations saw coastal Islamic culture as an attractive way of life and began to imitate it in many aspects and to appropriate it. Due to the high mobility along caravan routes, there was also a lively exchange of a wide variety of cultural elements between inland societies. Dance and music traditions, agricultural techniques and crops, clothing styles, religious practices, and children’s games changed under the influence of these encounters.

==== Foundations of Cities ====
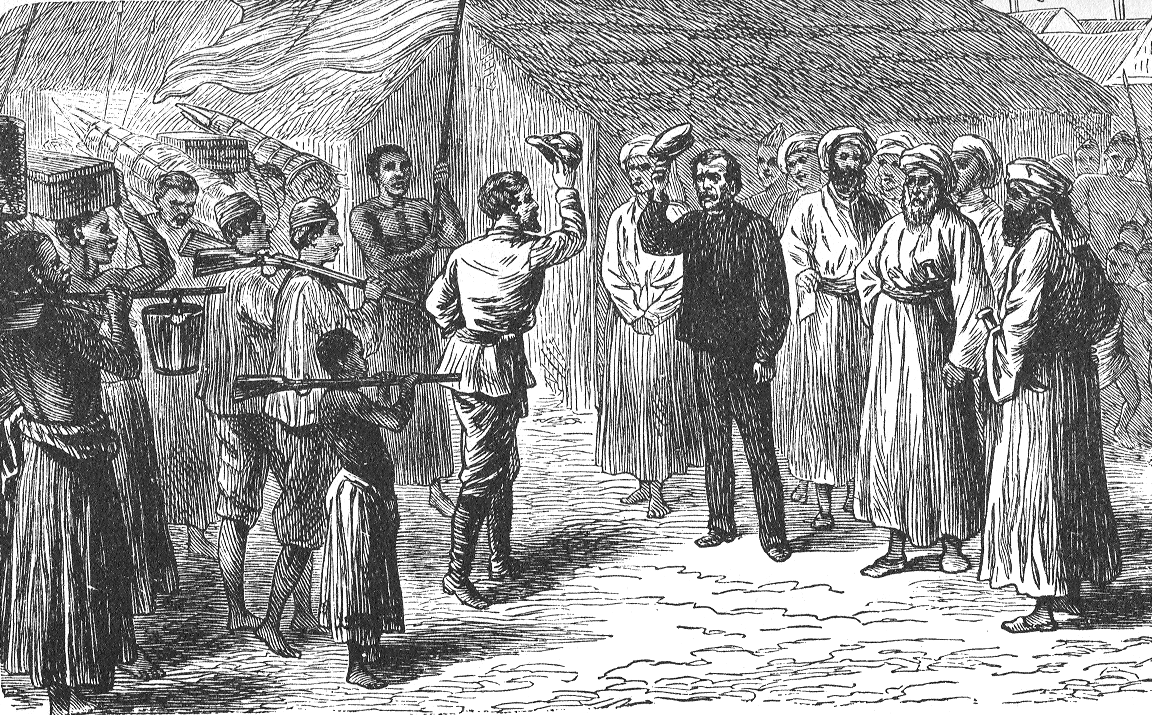
Henry Morton Stanley (left) meets David Livingstone (right) in Ujiji. Behind Livingstone stand bearers of decorations dressed in Muslim attire, behind Stanley his personal guide Kalulu, bearer and military escort. In addition, a flag bearer with the British flag (drawing from Stanley's book Comment j'ai trouvé D^{r} Livingstone [How I Found Dr. Livingstone]).

Since the caravans themselves represented places for the exchange of goods and ideas, this was equally true for the support points along caravan routes. They were established in locations already known to indigenous caravan leaders. Often, these were preexisting villages, sometimes the seat of a locally friendly authority. Coastal merchants over time established strong branches there, usually with military reinforcement, generally allied with local leaders. It was not uncommon for these leaders to request their support.

These villages quickly developed as lively hubs of commerce, attracting additional influxes of people. Indian and coastal merchants established secondary residences there and married into well-regarded local families. They could even settle permanently when they were unable to return to the coast due to debts. Mosques, exchange offices, shops, stone houses in Swahili style, and caravanserais were built. Tabora and Ujiji are examples of the expansion of coastal culture, where the Sultan of Zanzibar sought to extend his power by appointing envoys. Such cities exerted a strong attraction on surrounding local societies; they were not mere copies of Swahili urban culture but were amalgamated with the respective regional cultures. At Ujiji on Lake Tanganyika, for example, when missionary Edward Hore stayed there in 1876, only about 30 to 40 coastal merchants lived there, while several thousand residents came almost exclusively from nearby regions. Nevertheless, these cities, like the caravans themselves during their travels, exerted a strong attraction, with their air of global connections and links to an international trade network.

==== Islamization ====
Islamization played a central role in this process of cultural transfer. Many caravan participants found that converting to Islam facilitated business with coastal merchants. In addition, it reduced social distance with coastal merchants, who felt superior to the “pagan” peoples of the interior. The spread of Islam occurred within the caravans and along their routes. Merchants often supported the conversion to Islam of those in their entourage. Sufi brotherhoods spreading in East Africa, particularly the Qadiriyya, played a central role. They connected elements of local religions with Islam and were especially popular for their dance ceremonies and public religious rituals. The Qadiriyya differed from the Islam practiced on the East African coast in its integrative character. It welcomed people regardless of social status, origin, or education.

==== Daily life and consumption culture ====
Adaptation to coastal culture did not only mean adopting a new religious faith. It was linked with assimilation into a new bodily culture, including clothing styles, dietary rules, prescriptions of purity, and Islamic circumcision practices; young men no longer grew braids but shaved their heads in coastal fashion; it also became common to carry Quranic verses as amulets.

Inland merchants, over time and through their contacts with coastal merchants, developed a strong interest in all sorts of imported goods. Within a short time, umbrellas became coveted prestige items, along with hunting rifles, cash, and medicines. Cotton clothing arriving via trade to the interior became a sign of status and power. Chiefs, such as Semboja in Mazinde, dressed in fine Arab fabrics and furnished their homes with luxury goods from around the world.

Signs of caravan culture—rifles and bullets, flags, and currency—entered daily life, were incorporated into local warrior groups’ equipment, transformed into jewelry, and reflected in children’s toys. Everywhere, children made toy rifles. Historian John Iliffe recounts a Yao game where merchants and slaves faced each other: the loser was “dead on the road.”

== Slaves and the slave trade from 1870 ==
From 1870, British influence on the Sultan of Zanzibar grew massively. After the death of Said bin Sultan al-Busaid in 1856, disputes arose among his children over the throne. The empire was divided: Majid bin Said became Sultan of Zanzibar, and his elder brother Thuwaini ibn Sultan became Sultan of Oman. The succession dispute and an attempted overthrow by his brother Barghach bin Said put such pressure on Majid that British efforts at conciliation and support were well received.

British influence as a powerful partner became increasingly apparent in Zanzibar politics after Majid’s successor, Barghach, ascended the throne. Barghach significantly strengthened the sultan’s control over the coast, supported by the British consul-general in Zanzibar, John Kirk, and the military commander Lloyd Mathews, both known and feared inland as well. In exchange, the British required the sultan to enforce a ban on the slave trade, which had repeatedly been the subject of negotiations between Britain and the sultans of Zanzibar since the 1850s. Slavery had continuously represented a profitable factor in Zanzibar’s economy, both as an export product to the Indian Ocean and as a labor reservoir for the coastal plantation economy. Britain had become an increasingly strong maritime power—especially after the opening of the Suez Canal in 1869—and could exert significant pressure on Zanzibar’s trade routes to India.

== Plantation economy and slavery on the coast ==
Although Barghach yielded to British demands regarding the prohibition of the maritime slave trade, the trade in slaves continued. Since they could no longer be exported overseas, slaves flooded the East African coastal market. In any case, the demand for labor was high and continually growing with the commercial boom. Alongside the production of cloves for export, the plantation economy on the East African coast also served as a subsistence economy to supply the towns. Additionally, it contributed to interregional trade by producing sugar, which was a coveted exchange commodity.

In reality, the ban on the slave trade led to a dramatic deterioration in the living conditions of slaves. The prohibition on exporting slaves made them a cheap commercial commodity, reducing profits. Slaves were no longer possessions whose welfare was cared for one’s own benefit. It became more economical for planters to exploit slaves without regard and to purchase replacements when they died, rather than take precautions for proper care.

The consequence was a considerable loss of value and increasingly ruthless slave hunts to recover lost profits. The preferred territory for slave hunters was south of Tanganyika toward Lake Nyasa and the Zambezi, which had served as a source of slaves for more than two centuries, and where the Yao had long established slave-trading structures. Entire areas of the country were depopulated; the exodus—primarily of strong young men and women—led to the collapse of economic, cultural, and political structures. Many victims died during the capture itself; afterward, the exhausting march to the coast, with poor food and no medical care, claimed the lives of an estimated 50 to 70 percent of those who undertook the journey.

== Colonization and the end of caravan trade ==
The dizzying economic growth and ruthless plundering of human and ecological resources were followed at the end of the century by an equally abrupt economic collapse. This was not solely a consequence of colonization by the German Reich from around 1888, although it did alter political structures to the detriment of the merchants, as the conquerors tried to take control of trade. At the end of the 19th century, East Africa experienced a decade of famine and outbreaks of disease, which—due to economic globalization—swept the region. Ivory had to be brought from increasingly distant regions to the coast, journeys became longer, and due to the militarization of the interior, increasingly dangerous. New raw materials, primarily rubber, captured the market.

=== European travelers for exploration and administration ===
The beginning of Tanganyika’s colonization at the end of the 19th century did not mean the end of caravan trade. On the contrary, many European travelers, such as David Livingstone, Henry Morton Stanley, Richard Burton, and John Hanning Speke, as well as the first generation of colonial officials, such as Hermann von Wissmann and Carl Peters, traveled with experienced caravan merchants and benefited from their geographical knowledge and understanding of interior populations. By the 1870s, an infrastructure had developed for European travelers preparing to “discover” the continent. Sewa Hadji, an Indian businessman on the coast, was the first to equip European expeditions hungry for glory, acting as an intermediary with porters and contacts with merchant caravans.

The German colonial masters employed methods inspired by those of caravan merchants. They built their stations along existing caravan routes, composed their forces largely of guides, interpreters, and mercenaries trained in the caravan trade, and were interested in bringing trade and its profits under their control.

=== Colonial control over trade ===
Colonial control relied on the diseases spread by caravans, but above all, it used the pretext of combating the slave trade, which had been banned in the 1890s, and of abolishing “Arab preeminence” on the continent. From 1895 onwards, German firms gradually came to dominate trade in copal and rubber; German steamships represented strong competition for the maritime transport means previously used—dhows.

Under the Heligoland-Zanzibar Treaty, Zanzibar was administratively separated from the continent under German influence and incorporated into the British Empire. The Indian trading elite, which had held a key position in the ivory trade and was considered by both the British and Germans as subjects of the British Empire, was gradually displaced by competing German trading houses.

Ultimately, the colonial government exercised market constraints in coastal towns. By establishing trading halls where the value of all inland products had to be set at public auctions, trade could be better controlled, and the colonial administration benefited substantially from the trade through additional duties collected. Prices for inland products rose rapidly, while import firms and merchants saw significantly lower profits.

=== Ban on the ivory trade ===
Attempts were made to protect elephant populations, decimated in many areas, through export and hunting bans. European observers had already expressed concern about this by the late 19th century. From 1908, German East Africa implemented an elephant hunting ban that allowed exceptions only for holders of expensive hunting permits and limited each permit holder to capturing two animals.

=== Construction of railways ===
With the construction of railways—from 1891 the Usambara line from Tanga, from 1896 in British East Africa the Uganda line, and from 1904 the Tanganyika line—caravan trade ultimately ended due to competition from the railways. The number of porters traveling from Bagamoyo inland dropped from 43,880 to 193 between 1900 and 1912. In other regions, human-portage transport was still necessary. However, with the railways, new centers developed while those of the caravan system declined. For example, Ujiji and Bagamoyo lost all importance with the railway, while Dar es Salaam and Kigoma, at the ends of the Tanganyika line, became prosperous.

== Continuity of 19th-century commercial structures ==
The social, geographical, and cultural structures formed by 19th-century trade continued to shape the region’s subsequent development. The new railways, such as those of Tanganyika, Usambara, and Uganda, were constructed, with some deviations, along previous caravan routes and served the same purpose: transporting raw materials to the coast.

Colonial power was established from caravan trade centers, the coast, and towns that had emerged inland in the 19th century. Interior African societies responded to the new invaders using previously established strategies: they arranged to try to benefit on their side. Migrant workers on plantations of the new colonial masters or on railway construction sites came from regions that decades earlier had supplied caravan porters. They organized according to the same structures as caravan porters, worked under the same conditions, and used similar strategies to assert their demands regarding wages, measured working hours, and provisions.

Culturally, the dichotomy between the coast, marked by Islam with its branches along caravan routes, and the non-Islamic interior remained. Certainly, the expansion of Islam into the interior continued, but it occurred primarily along the new railway lines. Swahili, the lingua franca of caravan trade, was adopted by both British and German colonial administrations as the language of authority. After the independence of East African states, this legacy created the only region south of the Sahara able to use an African language as a common lingua franca.

A decisive consequence of the intense cultural exchange that had occurred in the 19th century was the organization of broad resistance uniting ethnic groups against German colonial rule during the Maji-Maji Rebellion of 1905–1907. During this rebellion, not only did a renewed form of religion emerge—rooted in intensive contact with elements of other religions—but also a consciousness of solidarity transcending ethnic divisions among the interior populations of Africa.

== History of research ==
The influence of the coast on the establishment of interregional trade in East Africa was long described primarily as the tyranny of Arab merchants over the African interior. European travelers, especially missionaries who traveled through East Africa during the 19th century, repeatedly and explicitly portrayed Muslim slave traders as conscienceless. This image of Islamic tyrants remained largely unchallenged for a long time; Christian missions thus discredited the competition of Islam spreading within their sphere of influence, and German colonial agents found a convenient pretext to place the region under their “protection.”

This perspective remained dominant in research for many years. Trade in East Africa was primarily treated as a system of slave commerce, in which coastal merchants were the active agents, while interior groups were passive victims. Economic historians of what became known as the Dar es Salaam school in the 1960s, who felt particularly obliged to write an African national history, changed this view. They demonstrated that caravan trade was oriented toward the global market, primarily based on ivory profits, and that the slave trade developed more as a byproduct. However, they also framed the history of caravan trade largely as a story of underdevelopment in indigenous Africa.

In the 1980s, as historical perspectives on African history broadened, a new assessment of the East African commercial boom emerged. It was no longer evaluated as exploitation of the interior by coastal merchants, but understood more as a complex system in which winners and losers could not be classified solely by ethnicity or geography. The participation of isolated regions and special trade actors, such as porters or women, was also incorporated into the analyses. Interior merchants who themselves traded in slaves, interior slaves who rose in coastal society, or the adoption of Islam as a strategy to become part of Swahili society are examples showing that people from all regions of East Africa actively participated in the dynamics of change.

Based on the work of British historian John Iliffe, the complex trade network that fundamentally shaped East African societies in the 19th century is increasingly regarded as decisive for the subsequent colonization and the current form of the region’s various nation-states. Current research concludes that many changes occurring during the colonial and post-colonial periods were shaped by African populations, with reactions and strategies rooted in 19th-century experiences.

== See also ==
- Ottoman–Portuguese conflicts (1586–1589)
- Portuguese discovery of the sea route to India
- Sofala
- Mutapa Empire
- Great Zimbabwe

== Bibliography ==
- Alpers, Edward (1975). Ivory and Slaves in East Central Africa. Changing Pattern of International Trade in East Central Africa in the later Nineteenth Century. London: University of California Press. doi:10.2307/jj.8085301. ISBN 978-0-520-30753-7.
- Bennett, Norman (1986). Arab versus European. Diplomacy and War in Nineteenth Century East Central Africa. New York: Holmes and Meier.
- Bückendorf, Jutta (1997). Schwarz-weiß-rot über Ostafrika!" Deutsche Kolonialpläne und afrikanische Realität [Black, white, and red over East Africa! German colonial plans and African reality] (in German).
- Glassman, Jonathan (1995). Feasts and Riot. Revelry, rebellion, and Popular Consciousness on the Swahili Coast, 1856–1888.
- Hahner-Herzog, Iris (1990). Tippu Tip und der Elfenbeinhandel in Ost- und Zentralafrika im 19. Jahrhundert [Tippu Tip and the ivory trade in East and Central Africa in the 19th century] (in German).
- Iliffe, John (1979). A Modern History of Tanganyika, Cambridge. Cambridge University Press. ISBN 0-521-29611-0.
- Iliffe, John (1997). Geschichte Afrikas [History of Africa] (in German). Munich: Beck. ISBN 3-406-46309-6.
- Koponen, Juhani (1988). People and Production in Late Precolonial Tanzania. History and Structures.
- Krajewski, Patrick (2005). "Dampfer und Dhaus" [Steamboats and schooners]. Der Maji-Maji-Krieg in Deutsch-Ostafrika, 1905–1907 [The Maji Maji War in German East Africa, 1905–1907] (in German). pp. 49–58.
- Pesek, Michael (2005). Koloniale Herrschaft in Deutsch-Ostafrika. Expeditionen, Militär und Verwaltung seit 1880 [Colonial rule in German East Africa. Expeditions, military, and administration since 1880] (in German). Francfort-sur-le-Main: Campus Verlag. ISBN 3-593-37868-X.
- Rockel, Stephen (2006). Carriers of Culture. Labor on the Road in Nineteenth-Century East Africa.
- Rockel, Stephen (1995). "Wage Labour and the Culture of Porterage in Nineteenth Century Tanzania: The Central Caravan Routes". South Asia Bulletin. 15 (2).
- Rockel, Stephen (2000). "A Nation of Porters. The Nyamwezi and the Labor Market in Nineteenth-Century Tanzania". Journal of African History. 41 (3): 173–195. doi:10.1017/S0021853799007628.
- Sheriff, Abdul (1987). Spices, and Ivory in Zanzibar. Integration of an East African Commercial Empire into the World Economy, 1770–1873.
- van Zwanenberg, Roger; King, A (1975). An Economic History of Kenya and Uganda, 1800–1970.
