= Cane handle camera =

Camera type

The 1903 Ben Akiba - Cane Handle Camera was patented by Emil Kronke (Dresden, Germany) in England on 13 August 1902, in Germany in 1903 and in the USA on 3 May 1904. It was manufactured by A. Lehmann in Berlin, Germany. The camera is named after Akiva ben Yosef. The Cane Handle Camera takes 20 exposures 13x25mm on a roll film 18mm wide and 70 cm long. 35mm f/9 meniscus lens. The shutter is released by pulling a knob below the handle.

A report published in the Scientific American (5 November 1904) stated:

Cane-handle camera, a German inventor has recently produced a magazine camera, which is contained within the handle of a cane. Cane-handle cameras were invented a dozen or more years ago and were designed especially for travellers. However they proved impractical owing to the fact that but a small supply of plates or films could be carried at the time in a cane. The camera illustrated uses rolls of film, a number of which may be stored in the hollow crook of the handle. The film passes from its roller in the magazine over a plate, which guides it in the focal plane for exposure, thence it is taken up upon the receiving spool in a chamber below. When the entire film has been exposed upon the receiving spool, the side face of the cane handle is removed. The exposed film roll is then taken out, and a new one moved to position for use immediately back of the guide plate.
