= Ó Maolconaire =

Medieval Irish family name

Ó Maolchonaire, sometimes Ó Maoil Chonaire, sometimes Ó Mhaoil Chonaire, Ó Maolconaire, Uí Mhaoil Chonaire, Ó Maelchonaire, etc., was the surname of a family of professional poets and historians in medieval Ireland. Traditionally, it would have been spelled without the 'h', but with a dot over the 'c', either of which indicates aspiration. In a period prior to the surrender of the Ó Conchubhair Donn and the other Connacht chieftains, it was anglicised O'Mulconry. Specific families, particularly the educators, were systematically targeted as part of the plot to destroy the Irish culture and language, as well as the Catholic religion. This can add great confusion to researchers of this important literary and religious family. It is now rendered most commonly Conry, sometimes Conroy, and possibly sometimes King. There are many distinct groups of Conroys, some of whom also, though less commonly, use Conry, which are Anglicisations of disparate Irish Gaelic names.

== Overview ==
A bardic family descended from Maine of Tethba, based in County Roscommon in Connacht, many members of the Ó Maoil Chonaire family were successive Ollamh Síl Muireadaigh to the Síol Muireadaigh and other Irish dynasties from the 12th to 17th centuries. Their principal seat was at Cluaine na-hOidhche near Strokestown and their primary patron was the Ó Conchobhair Donn, but they also served the MacDermot Kings of Magh Luirg, among many of the other principal chieftains of the Síol Muireadaigh, as well as various other dynasties throughout Ireland. As chiefly historians and poets of the royal variety, they had immense land holdings on account of their profession. In Gaelic Ireland the filídh and séanachie were held in high esteem, with the Ollamh considered to be of equal stature to the Ard-Rí.

== Notability ==
The first extant reference to the family occurs in the annals attributed to Tighearnach, which record the death of Néidhe Úa Mael Conaire, in senchaidh, in 1136. Among their principal surviving works are the Annals of Connacht, which covers the years 1224 to 1544. Fearfeasa Ó Maoil Chonaire was one of the "four masters" who were credited with compiling the Annals of the Four Masters. The family was also responsible for the literary manuscript now known as 23 N 10, and Egerton 1782.

Students of the family included John de Burgh, Archbishop of Tuam. In a much later period, William J. Higgins, Speaker of the Newfoundland House of Assembly, and leader of the Liberal-Labour-Progressive Party, was the student, law partner and protégé of Charles O'Neill Conroy, only son of James Gervé Conroy.

Flaithri Ó Maolconaire, also Florence Conry (Conroy, O'Mulconry), Irish Franciscan and theologian, founder of the College St. Anthony at Louvain, and Archbishop of Tuam.

== Ollamh Síol Muireadaigh ==
- Dúinnín Ó Maolconaire, d. 1231
- Máeleoin Bódur Ó Maolconaire, d. 1266
- Dubsúilech Ó Maolconaire
- Tanaide Mor mac Dúinnín Ó Maolconaire, 1270–1310
- Mael Sechlainn Ó Domhnalláin, Ollav of Sil-Murray in particular in poetry, and the most learned man in all Ireland in the same art, died of Fiolun in 1375
- Tanaide Ó Maolconaire, d. 1385
- Donnchad Baccach Ó Maolconaire, d. 1404
- Flann Óc mac Séoan Ó Domhnalláin, d. 1404
- Dauid mac Tanaide Ó Maolconaire, d. 1419
- Cormac Ó Domhnalláin, d. 1436
- Mailin mac Tanaide Ó Maolconaire, d. 1441
- Sadhbh Ó Mailchonaire, d. 1447
- Torna Ó Maolconaire, d. 1468
- Urard Ó Maolconaire, d. 1482
- Sigraid Ó Maolconaire, d. 1487
  - Mailin mac Torna Ó Maolconaire, d. 1519
  - Domhnall Ó Maolconaire, fl. 1487
- Torna mac Torna Ó Maolconaire, d. 1532
- Conchobar mac Domnall Ruad Ó Maolconaire, 1532–15??
- Muirges mac Paidin Ó Maolconaire, d. 1543
- Lochlainn mac Paidin Ó Maolconaire, d. 1551

== Ó Maolchonaires in the Annals ==
- Néidhe Ó Maolchonaire, the historian, rested., 1136 The Annals of Tigernach
- Maeleoin Bodar (the Deaf) O Mailchonaire took Cluain Bolcain this year, 1232
- Dauid mac Tanaide Ó Maolconaire, 1404–1419
- Donnchadh Ua Mail-Conaire the Fair, namely, ollam of the Sil-Muiredhaigh in history, died this year. Annals of Ulster, 1405
- Diarmait Ruad Ó Maolconaire, d. 1441
- Tanaide mac Mailin Ó Maolconaire, d. 1446
- Maelsechlainn mac Urard Ó Maolconaire, 1452
- Diarmait mac Domnall Ó Maolconaire, son of Domnall, son of Eoin, son of Sitrice Ruad, d. 1465
- M1487.9 Maurice, the son of Loughlin O'Mulconry, teacher of his own art poetry, died in Tirconnell, after a long illness, and after the victory of penance, and was interred at Donegal.
- M1488.44 Mulconry, the son of Torna O'Mulconry, died of a short fit of sickness at Cluain-na-hoidhche.
- M1489.40 Melaghlin, son of Loughlin O'Mulconry, died while on his bardic circuit through Munster.
- M1495.17 Donnell O'Mulconry, Ollav of Sil-Murray, died; and two O'Mulconrys were set up in his place, namely, John, son of Torna, and Donough, son of Athairne.
- M1506.10 Paidin O'Mulconry, only choice of Ireland in his time for history and poetry, died.
- M1519.10 Maoilin, son of Torna O'Mulconry, OIlav of Sil-Murray, a man full of prosperity and learning, who had been selected by the Geraldines and English to be their Ollav, in preference to all the chief poets of Ireland, and who had obtained jewels and riches of all from whom he had asked them, died in Mainistir-derg in Teffia.
- Lochlainn Ó Maolconaire
- Cu Choicriche Ó Maolconaire
- Sean Ó Maolconaire of Baile in Chuimine, fl. 1575
- Fintan mac Illann meic Dubhthach "intended ollave of Síl-Muiredhaigh," d. 1585
- Tuileagna Ó Maoil Chonaire, fl. c. 1585
- Senchán, d. 1588
- John Ruadh mac Lochlainn meic Paidin, d. 1589
- 1602 Flaithrí Ó Maoil Chonaire

== Later descendants of the Ó Maoil Chonaires ==
- John Conroy, Welsh-born Protestant, absentee landlord, baronet and comptroller to the Duchess of Kent, rumoured true father of Queen Victoria
- James Gervé Conroy, lawyer, judge, and MHA for Ferryland and the Avalon Peninsula in Newfoundland, leader of the Anti-Confederation Party, founder and editor of the Irish Catholic newspaper Terra Nova Advocate

== Genealogy ==
From 180.7, pp. 402–03, Leabhar na nGenealach, volume I.

- Brian Óg s. Maoilín s. Torna s. Maoilín s. Tanaidhe s. Páidín s. Néidhe s. Conaing Buidhe s. Tanaidhe Eólach s. Conaing Eólach s. Tanaidhe s. Duinnín s. Dúnlang Consoileach s. Maol Póil s. Maoilín Mear s. Maol Conaire, from whom is the family, s. Flaithfhile s. Brógan s. Dubh Dhá Thuath s. Flann s. Maol Dúin s. Forannán s. Ainmhire s. Criomthann s. Brian s. Maine s. Niall.
