= 1457 in Ireland =

- Centuries: 13th; 14th; 15th; 16th; 17th
- Decades: 1430s; 1440s; 1450s; 1460s; 1470s
- See also: Other events of 1457; List of years in Ireland

Events from the year 1457 in Ireland.

== Incumbent ==
- Lord: Henry VI

== Events ==
- James Alleyn's tenure as Lord Chief Justice and Chief Justice of the Common Pleas ends.
- The Augustinians establish Murrisk Abbey on Clew Bay, County Mayo.
- Future bishop of Meath, William Sherwood (bishop) graduates from the University of Bologna
- West Breifne leader, Lochlainn Ó Ruairc attempts to ambush the Mag Uidhirs of Fermanagh.
- Michael Tregury travels to Rome to appeal his suspension as Archbishop of Dublin.
- Philip Norris (c. 1400–1465) appointed Dean of St Patrick's Cathedral, Dublin.
