= 1231 in poetry =

The following is a list of events in poetry that occurred in 1231. This list includes births and deaths.

== Events ==
- Máeleoin Bódur Ó Maolconaire becomes Ollamh Síl Muireadaigh

== Deaths ==
- December 25 – Folquet de Marselha (born c. 1155), Occitan troubadour, later bishop
- Dúinnín Ó Maolconaire (born unknown), Irish bard, first recorded Ollamh Síl Muireadaigh
