= Tanaide Mor mac Dúinnín Ó Maolconaire =

Tanaide Mor mac Dúinnín Ó Maolconaire was a member of the Ó Maolconaire family of Connacht, who served as historians and poets to the Síol Muireadaigh, and their rulers, the Ó Conchubhair Kings of Connacht.

He became Ollamh in 1270, succeeding Dubsúilech (and possibly Dunlang) Ó Maolconaire on the "seat in the Ollam's Chair of the province of Connacht," and was himself a son of a previous Ollamh, Dúinnín Ó Maolconaire. The annals state that "Tany More, son of Duinnin, son of Nedhe, son of Conaing Boy O'Mulconry, was elected to the chief ollavship of Connacht; and the ollavships of Dubhshuileach O'Mulconry and Dunlang O'Mulconry were abolished."

His genealogy in the Annals of Connacht is given as "Tanaide Mor mac Dúinnín meic Nede meic Conaing Buide Ó Maolconaire." The same source quotes a fragment of verse which relates that "Tanaide the teacher/a learned Ollamh/son of Dúinnín/spent forty famous years/on the floor of Liss Lerthaile," the latter place presumably being where he lived and taught his pupils.

His obituary in 1310 states "Tanaide Ó Maolconaire, Ollamh in poetry and history of the Síol Muireadaigh, died at the beginning of this year, that is, in the hard spring." His immediate successor is unknown; the next person named in the office was Tanaide Ó Maolconaire who died in 1385.

Preceded by Dubsúilech Ó Maolconaire	Ollamh Síol Muireadaigh; 1270–1310	Succeeded by Tanaide Ó Maolconaire
