= 1444 in Ireland =

- Centuries: 13th; 14th; 15th; 16th; 17th
- Decades: 1420s; 1430s; 1440s; 1450s; 1460s
- See also: Other events of 1444; List of years in Ireland

1449 in Ireland

Events from the year 1444 in Ireland.

== Incumbents ==
- Lord of Ireland: Henry VI
- Lord High Treasurer: William Chevir
- King of Tyrone: Eoghan mac Néill Óg O'Neill
- King of Leinster: Donnchadh mac Art Mac Murchadha Caomhánach
- King of Connacht: Aedh mac Tairdelbach Óg Ó Conchobair
- King of Osraige: Donnchadh Mór Riabhach
- King of Desmond: Domhnall an Dana Mac Carthaigh
- King of Thomond: Mathghamhain Dall Ó Briain
- Lord of Clonlonan: Laighnech mac Corc

== Events ==
- 21 June - James Butler, 4th Earl of Ormond, held a meeting of the Great Council at Drogheda.
- 6 November - Cormac Mác Shamhradháin was appointed as the next Bishop of Ardagh.

== Deaths ==
- 2 May - Hugh Boy II O'Neill, King of Clandeboye (birth date unknown)
