= Dubsúilech Ó Maolconaire =

Dubsúilech Ó Maolconaire was a member of the Ó Maolconaire family of Connacht, who served as historians and poets to the Síol Muireadaigh and their rulers, the Ó Conchubhair Kings of Connacht.

He appears to have been chief ollamh of Connacht, and thus presumably that of the Síol Muireadaigh. However, the entry in the Annals of Connacht is somewhat ambiguous:

"It was in this year that the reign of the ollavs Dubshuilech and Dunlang O Mailchonaire came to an end, and Tanaide Mor son of Duinnin son of Nede son of Conaing Buide O Mailchonaire took his seat in the Ollav's Chair of the province of Connacht. In the words [of the poet]: 'Tanaide the teacher, a learned ollav, son of Duinnin, spent forty famous years on the floor of Liss Lerthaile.'"

The possibility therefore exists that Dubsúilech and Dunlang held the post jointly during their lives. Their successor was a son of a previous Ollamh, Dúinnín Ó Maolconaire.

Preceded by Máeleoin Bódur Ó Maolconaire	Ollamh Síol Muireadaigh; 1266–1270	Succeeded by Tanaide Mor mac Dúinnín Ó Maolconaire
