= Filí =

Class of poets in Ireland and Scotland

< fili > (plural: filid, filidh).
..."Member of a privileged
powerful caste of poets,
diviners and seers in early Ireland.
To be distinguished from the
lower-status bard and the brehon...

— James MacKillop

The fili (or filè) (Note: Hyde – Irish Literature..."There were two kinds of poets known to the early Gael, the principle of those was called the filè (filla); there were seven grades of filès, the most exalted being called an ollamh (ollav) ...) (Note: Historians prefer to use the Old Irish fili rather than filè – to avoid confusion with modern Irish file – which has a different meaning.) (Old Irish pronunciation: [/ˈfʲilʲi/]), plural filid, filidh (or filès), was a member of an elite class of poets in Ireland, and later Scotland, up until the Renaissance. (Note: MacKillop – Celtic Mythology..."The simple translation of "poet" is misleading, as much of the writing of the fili in his guise as senchaid (historian) was in prose ...) The filid were believed to have the power of divination, and therefore able to foresee, foretell and predict important events. (Note: MacKillop – Celtic Mythology..."the fili might use an esoteric language ...his craft was filidecht ...) (Note: See also wiktionary: Old Irish < filidecht > ..."poetry, divination".)

In an early society in which most people were illiterate – including its hierarchy of chieftains, sub-kings and kings – the oral tradition was an important means of communicating current news and historical events. (Note: Coleman – Áedán of the Gaels......"According to medieval Irish manuscripts, the highest grade of poets had to commit to memory 250 major tales and 350 minor ones ...) (Note: Coleman – Áedán of the Gaels......"the audience for these primary tales were chieftains and kings ...) As both a poet and storyteller, the fili would hope to gain a professional reputation for the authenticity and reliability of their information. (Note: Coleman – Áedán of the Gaels......"Early professional story tellers were highly honoured and peripatetic, carrying tales from one kingdom to another...)

== Etymology ==
The term fili likely derives from primitive Irish ᚃᚓᚂᚔᚈᚐᚄ]VELITAS]; from Proto-Celtic *weleti ("to see"); and Proto-Indo-European *wel- ("to see, perceive"). (Note: See also wiktionary: English <perceive>: 1. "To become aware of, to see; to understand.; 2. "To interpret something in a particular way.) An etymology from PIE welo- is offered by Matasović. He notes: "The semantic development of Olr.fil was from 'Lo, behold' (lmpv. of *wel-o- 'see') to 'there is'. Olr.file [d m] 'poet' is a derivative from this root (cf. Ogam Gen. sg. VELITAS). The original meaning was 'seer', PCelt. *wel-et-."

The word "fili" is thought to derive from the Proto-Celtic *widluios, meaning "seer, one who sees" (attested on the Gaulish inscription from Larzac as "uidluias", which is the feminine genitive singular form), derived ultimately from the verb *widlu-, "to see". This can be compared to the Latin vatis and the Ancient Greek ouateis, stemmed in Gaulish, modern vate improperly written ovate but still used by the OBOD neodruids.

== Highest orders ==
=== Ollam ===
There were seven orders of fili, the highest order being the ollam, (Note: MacKillop – Dictionary of Celtic Mythology..."Of the seven orders of fili, the ollam is the highest and most often cited ...) which required at least 12 years of training. (Note: MacKillop – Dictionary of Celtic Mythology..."Trained for at least 12 years in rigorous mental exercise ...) The ollam were required to commit to memory 250 major tales and 350 minor ones.

==== Ollamh Érenn (Ireland) ====
The Ollamh Érenn was the master poet of Ireland. There was a hierarchy of master poets:

1. Each túath had its own ollam.
2. Each province had a head ollam above the túath ollams.
3. The Ollamh Érenn was the head ollam above all others.

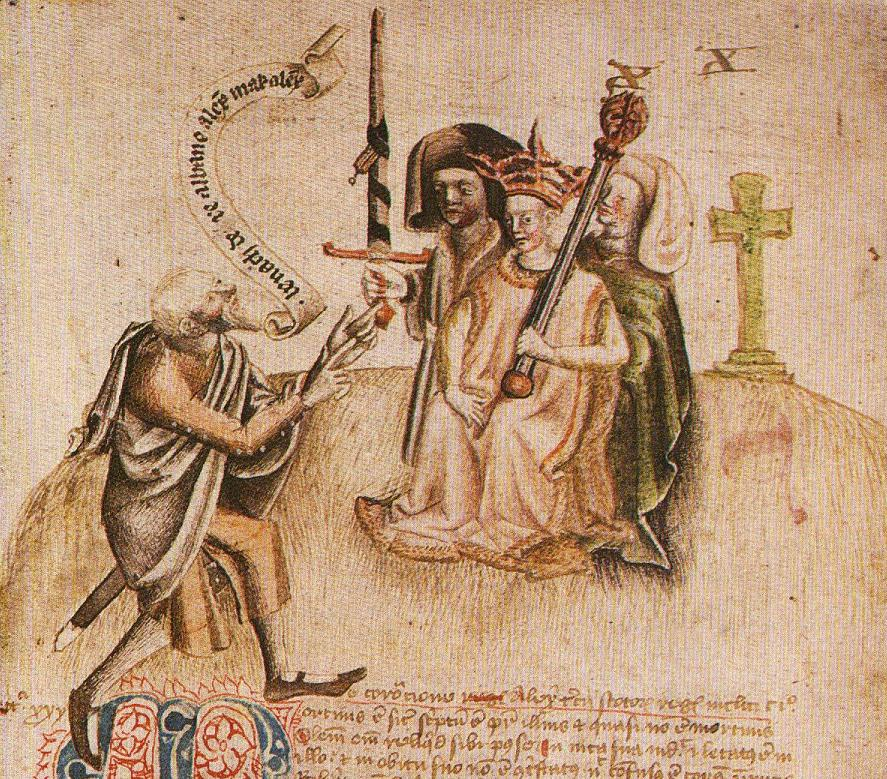
An Ollaimh Righ at the coronation of Alexander III as King of Scots, 1249.

==== Ollamh rig Alban (Scotland) ====
In medieval Scotland the Ollamh rig Alban – 'Master poet of Scotland' – was an important member of the king's court. Whenever a new king was inaugurated, it was necessary for the Ollamh rig to recite the future king's genealogy, in order to verify his legitimate right to succeed. (Note: Coleman – Áedán of the Gaels......"the Ollamh rig Alban, 'master poet of Scotland', was a vital component of the inauguration of national monachs here up to the installation of Alexander III in 1249 ..."a Highlander came forward to bless Alexander and declare him as king of Scotland. Then he proclaimed the rulers lineage in a role which was doubtless a survival of the ceremonial's which took place long before in Dál Riata ...) (Note: Moffat – Scotland, A History......"no delays could be allowed and the seven year old Alexander III was quickly inaugurated at Scone on 13 July 1249. There exists an illustration of the moment in the ceremony when An Ollaimh Righ stood forward to recite the young kings genealogy and thereby assert his right to succeed ...)

Phrase	English	Scottish Gaelic
Ollamh rig Alban	Master poet of Scotland	<Alba> Scotland
An Ollaimh Righ	The master poet of the king	<rìgh> king
Do gairm rig	Proclamation of the king	<gairm> proclamation

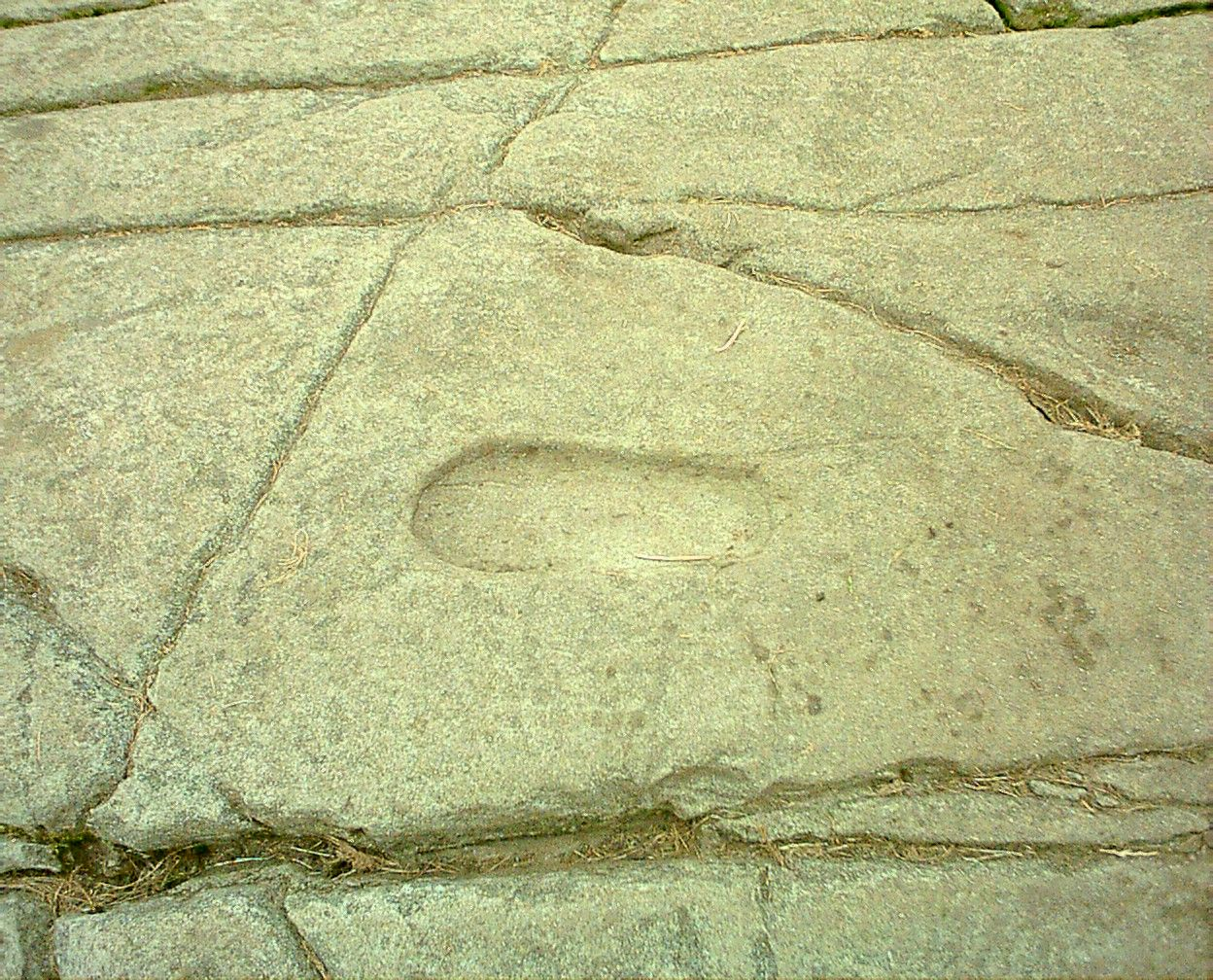
Footprint used in king-making ceremonies, Dunadd

==== Do gairm rig (Dal Riata) ====
The ancient traditions of the inauguration ceremony at Scone beside the River Tay in Scotland, including the recital of the future king's ancestry, probably originated at the Hill of Tara in County Meath, Ireland. (Note: Coleman – Áedán of the Gaels......"The pagan ceremony in one part of Ireland, where the king was ritually mated to his land (Feis Temro, the Feast of Tara) took place for the last time in the year 560 ...)

Those traditions were introduced into Scottish Dal Riata – from Irish Dal Riata – where the ceremony was known as do gairm rig ..."Proclamation of the king". (Note: Coleman – Áedán of the Gaels......"The Inauguration of Áedán ...The chief poet of the kingdom will have advanced to exclaim the name and ancestry of this ruler. This solemn proclamation, called do gairm rig, would formally give Áedán sovereignty. His bare foot would be placed into the hollow of the living rock ...) The Dal Riata community later moved east to the Perthshire region of Scotland, following Viking attacks on the west coast in the 9th century. (Note: Foster – Picts, Gaels and Scots Cinaid mac Ailpin ..."but the Gaels may also have been impelled to move east due to the pressure of Viking attacks on Argyll ...)

==== Kenneth MacAlpin ====
Viking attacks on the north east coast of Pictland resulted in a power vacuum, (Note: Foster – Picts, Gaels and Scots Cinaid mac Ailpin ..."His ambitions were helped by the fact that many of the Pictish nobles had been wiped out in a battle with the Vikings in 839 ...) and an opportunity for Kenneth MacAlpin to become the first leader of both Dal Riata and Pictland. (Note: Moffat – Scotland, A History......"While bards and seannachies attempted to legitimise Kenneth MacAlpin's claim to the united throne as they sang of his glorious descent from the hero kings of the Cenél nGabráin ...) A new royal power base and inauguration site was created at Scone beside the River Tay. (Note: Foster – Picts, Gaels and Scots..."Conceivably it was Cinaid mac Ailpin who chose to cultivate the Pictish centre at Scone to become a new royal power base and inauguration site. Certainly, in 849 he invested a church, thought to be Dunkeld, with some of St Columba's relics from Iona ...)

=== Seanchaí ===
The term poet is misleading, because the filid were also seanchaí – historians – who advised chieftains and kings on political matters. The filid were believed to have the power of divination, and therefore able to foresee, foretell, predict – important events.

=== Fear of satire ===
The term poet is misleading, because the filid had extraordinary power and influence over the kings and political leaders who sponsored them. It was important for leaders to treat the filid with respect, and to reward them handsomely, in order to get good quality information on current affairs. The filid had the ability to portray their sponsors in a positive or negative way, and to influence neighbouring leaders. (Note: Coleman – Áedán of the Gaels......"Medieval poets in both Ireland and Wales were prone at times to extend the realistic influence of their patrons to magnify their importance ...)

At the darker and more extreme end of the scale – if leaders failed to treat the filid with due respect – they ran the risk of satire. This was a kind of blackmail whereby the filid might ridicule them in front of neighbouring leaders. (Note: Coleman – Áedán of the Gaels......"Should the lord or king fail to show appropriate welcome to the poets, or incur their displeasure otherwise, he might be subjected to their satire ...) (Note: Coleman – Áedán of the Gaels......"the saint had a dispute with a poet and druid named Diarmait ...The king of Connacht refused to pronounce against the powerful druid, fearful of his threat of satire ...)

The filid were believed to have the power of divination, but they were also feared to have the power to influence future events. (Note: Coleman – Áedán of the Gaels......"dangerous effects of satire, specifically the power of poets to cause ulcers and deformity on the subject of their contempt, if indeed he did not immediately die ...) (Note: Coleman – Áedán of the Gaels......"There may have been growing dissent between the poets and the royal sponsors they preyed upon...When they were threatened with expulsion...Colum Cille defended the 'wise men of Ireland' ...)

== Classification ==
=== Irish storytelling ===
The tales regaled by the filid were classified as:

Old Irish	English
togla	destructions
tana	cattle raids
tochmarca	wooings
catha	battles
uatha	terrors
immrama	voyages
aite	deaths
fessa	feasts
forbassa	sieges
echtrae	adventure journeys
aitheda	elopements
airgne	plunderings

=== Irish poetry ===
==== Bérla na filed ====
Bérla na filed – "language of the poets" – was possibly an esoteric mix of Latin, Hebrew, English, and Irish.

== History ==
=== Elite scholars ===
According to the Textbook of Irish Literature, by Eleanor Hull:

The file is to be regarded as in the earliest times as combining in his person the functions of magician, lawgiver, judge, counsellor to the chief, and poet. Later, but still at a very early time, the offices seem to have been divided, the brehons devoting themselves to the study of law, and the giving of legal decisions, the druids arrogating to themselves the supernatural functions, with the addition, possibly of some priestly offices, and the filí themselves being henceforth principally as poets and philosophers. The division seems to have already existed in Ireland at the time of St Patrick, whose preaching brought him into constant opposition with the druids, who were evidently, at that time, regarded as the religious leaders of the nation, though there does not seem to be much sign that they were, as they undoubtedly were, even at an earlier age in Britain and Gaul, sacrificing priests.

=== Oral tradition ===
The fili maintained an oral tradition that predated the Christianisation of Ireland. In this tradition, poetic and musical forms are important not only for aesthetics, but also for their mnemonic value. The tradition allowed plenty of room for improvisation and personal expression, especially in regard to creative hyperbole and clever kenning. However, the culture placed great importance on the fili's ability to pass stories and information down through the generations without making changes to those elements that were considered factual rather than embellishment.

In this manner, a significant corpus of pre-Christian myth and epic literature remained largely intact many centuries into the Christian era. Much of it was first recorded in writing by scholarly Christian monks. The synergy between the rich and ancient indigenous oral literary tradition and the classical tradition resulted in an explosion of monastic literature that included epics of war, love stories, nature poetry, saint tales and so forth, which collectively resulted in the largest corpus of non-Latin literature seen in Europe since Ancient Greece.

=== Decline ===
The ultimate accommodation of Christianity within Irish Gaelic society resulted in a strain on the resources of the Chiefs, in that they were required to provide land and titles for both fili and bishop alike. Consequently, a decision was made in the 6th century to limit the number of fili to certain families who were respected and believed to be poets as a birthright. The greatest of these families included the Ó Dálaigh (O'Daly), several of whom were accorded the rank of 'chief ollamh of poetry of all Ireland,' and Ó hUiginn (O'Higgins) who were hereditary filí in more than one Gaelic house such as O'Conor Slighit, the MacDermotts, the McDonagh and O'Doherty. The Ó Cobhthaigh (Coffey's) were known as the fili of Uisneach.

The Ó Maol Chonaire were chiefly Ollamhs of the Síol Muireadhaigh, the Ó Conchubhair Donn and the MacDermot of Moylurg, although this family was also associated with Ulster and spread from Connacht into the courts of Munster and Leinster. Finally the Ó Cléirighs who served the O'Donnel chieftains of Tír Connell.

The hereditary poets that were a fixture of court life in medieval Ireland, serving as entertainers, advisors and genealogists, maintained the practices of – and enjoyed a similar status to – the pre-Christian fili. However, from the 12th century onwards, Anglo-Norman elements had increasing influence on Irish society. As Gaelic culture waned, these folk became increasingly involved with written literature and such non-native traditions as heraldry. Nonetheless, in Gaelic society, the chief filí of the province (Ollamh) was seen as having equal status to the Ard-rí, or High King. This high social status existed into Elizabethan times, when English nobility were horrified to see the Gaelic chieftains not just eating at the same table as their poets, but often from the same dish. Eventually classical literature and the Romantic literature that grew from the troubadour tradition of the langue d'oc superseded the material that would have been familiar to the ancient fili.

== Legacy ==
Many manuscripts preserving the tales once transmitted by the fili have survived. This literature contributes much to the modern understanding of druids, Celtic religion and the Celtic world in general.

Besides its value to historians, this canon has contributed a great deal to modern literature beginning with retellings by William Butler Yeats and other authors involved with the Celtic Revival. Soon after, James Joyce drew from material less explicitly. Fantasy literature and art now draws heavily from these tales, and characters such as Cúchulainn, Finn McCool and the Tuatha Dé Danann are relatively familiar.

Through such traditional musicians as Turlough O'Carolan (who died in 1738 and is often lauded as "the last of the bards") and countless of his lesser-known or anonymous colleagues, the musical tradition of the fili has made its way to contemporary ears via artists such as Planxty, The Chieftains and The Dubliners.

In their subject matter and techniques, the seanachie are considered the inheritors of the ancient Irish tradition of oral literature.

The modern Irish and Scottish Gaelic words for "poet" are derived from fili.

- Old Irish: fili, plural filid
- Modern Irish: file, plural filí (Note: Compare Old Irish – Modern Irish: 1. Old Irish < fili > has no fada.; 2. Modern Irish < filí > with síneadh fada.)
- Scottish Gaelic: filidh, plural filidhean
- Manx Gaelic: feelee

Finally, practitioners of Celtic Reconstructionist Paganism are working to reconstruct trance and visionary techniques that were used by the filid, such as imbas forosnai and aspects of the tarbhfeis ritual.

== See also ==
- Bard
- Contention of the bards
- Druid
- Early Irish literature
- Gorsedd
- Rhapsode
- Seanachie
- Skald
- Vates

== Sources ==
- Coleman, Keith (2022). Áedán of the Gaels: King of the Scots. Pen and Sword Books. ISBN 978-1526794901.
- Foster, Sally M. (2014). Picts, Gaels and Scots: Early Historic Scotland. Edinburgh: Birlinn. ISBN 978-1780271910.
- MacKillop, James (2004). Oxford Dictionary of Celtic Mythology. Oxford University Press. ISBN 0-19-860967-1.
- Moffat, Alistair (2017). Scotland, A History from Earliest Times. Birlinn. ISBN 978-1780274386.
- Noble, Gordon; Evans, Nicholas (2022). The Picts: Scourge of Rome, Rulers of the North. Birlinn. ISBN 978-1780277783.

- (Filidh)
