= Tuileagna Ó Maoil Chonaire =

Irish poet

Tuileagna Ó Maoil Chonaire (fl. 1585) was an Irish poet.

A member of the Ó Maolconaire bardic family of Connacht, Tuileagna is known from a number of extant works, including Labhram ar iongnaibh Éireann, addressed to Sir Nicholas Walsh, Chief Justice of the Common Pleas and previously Speaker of the third Irish Parliament convened in the reign of Queen Elizabeth I, (Perrott's parliament) of 1585–6. It relates the Middle Irish story of the judgement of King Niall Frossach of Ailech (died 778) concerning a young woman and her fatherless child.

The only manuscript in which it survives is Royal Irish Academy 23 L 17 (RIA 3). Two copies of the Middle Irish text that have survived, from Leabhar Mór Leacain and Liber Flavus Fergusiorum.

== See also ==
- Ollamh Síl Muireadaigh
- 23 N 10
- John Fergus (scholar), died c. 1761, hereditary keeper of Liber Flavus Fergusiorum
- Flaithri Ó Maolconaire
