= 1442 in Ireland =

- Centuries: 13th; 14th; 15th; 16th; 17th
- Decades: 1420s; 1430s; 1440s; 1450s; 1460s
- See also: Other events of 1442; List of years in Ireland

Events from the year 1442 in Ireland.

== Incumbent ==
- Lord: Henry VI

== Deaths ==
- Gilla Dubh Ó Flaithbheartaigh, Lord of Iar Connacht and Chief of the Name
