= 1450 in Ireland =

- Centuries: 13th; 14th; 15th; 16th; 17th
- Decades: 1430s; 1440s; 1450s; 1460s; 1470s
- See also: Other events of 1450; List of years in Ireland

Events from the year 1450 in Ireland.

== Incumbent ==
- Lord: Henry VI

== Events ==
- 7 August – Edmund Oldhall is appointed Bishop of Meath.
- Richard Duke of York, Lord Lieutenant of Ireland, returns to England, following the submission of many Irish chiefs and English rebels.

== Births ==
- Thomas Rochfort - a judge and cleric who held the offices of Solicitor General for Ireland

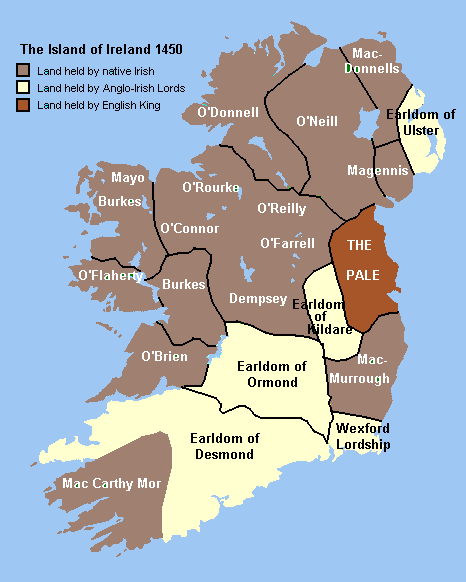
Irish landholdings in 1450

== Deaths ==
- Tadhg Ó Caiside, physician and Chief of the Name.
