= Donnchad Baccach Ó Maolconaire =

Donnchad Baccach Ó Maolconaire, Ollamh Síl Muireadaigh from 1385 to 1404.

Very little is known about Donnchad Baccach. The Annals of Connacht merely relate that he was Ollam of the Síol Muireadaigh in history. Given that all known past holders of the office had been drawn from the clan Ó Maolconaire, it is perhaps indicative of some unrest that the next Ollamh, at least as far as poetry, was from another family, the clan Ó Domhnalláin.

== Sources ==
- The Encyclopaedia of Ireland 2003; ISBN 0-7171-3000-2.
- Mac Dermot of Moylurg: The Story of a Connacht Family Dermot Mac Dermot, 1996.
- A New History of Ireland VIII: A Chronology of Irish History to 1976 - A Companion to Irish History Part I edited by T.W. Moody, F.X. Martin and F.J. Byrne, 1982. ISBN 0-19-821744-7
- The Celebrated Antiquary Nollaig O Muralie, Maynooth, 1996.
- Irish Leaders and Learning Through the Ages Fr. Paul Walsh, 2004. (ed. Nollaig O Muralie).

Preceded by Tanaide Ó Maolconaire	Ollamh Síol Muireadaigh; 1385 - 1404	Succeeded by Flann Óc mac Séoan Ó Domhnalláin
