= 1448 in Ireland =

- Centuries: 13th; 14th; 15th; 16th; 17th
- Decades: 1420s; 1430s; 1440s; 1450s; 1460s
- See also: Other events of 1448; List of years in Ireland

Events from the year 1448 in Ireland.

== Incumbents ==
- Lord: Henry VI
- Lieutenant of Ireland – Richard, Duke of York
- Lord Chancellor – Richard Wogan

== Events ==
- The Franciscan friary Muckross Abbey is established in County Kerry.

== Deaths ==
- Tadg Óg Ó hUiginn
