= Big ears =

Big ears refer to prominently-sized ears, or preferably protruding ears.

Big Ear or Big Ears may also refer to:

== Books ==
- Big Ears (character), character in the Noddy books by Enid Blyton

== Film and TV ==
- Big Ears, 1931 American comedy short in the Our Gang series
- "Big Ears", 1955 episode of Our Miss Brooks
- Big Ear Tutu, Chinese cartoon television series, or main character Hu Tutu, a young boy with very large ears

== Folklore ==
- Big Ears, the name given in Scotland to a demonic cat said to appear during a magical taghairm ritual

== Music ==
- Big Ears, pop album by Cevanne Horrocks-Hopayian
- "Big Ears", track by the Hedley Ward Trio on Melodisc Records
- Big Ears Festival, annual music festival in Knoxville, Tennessee

== Other ==
- Big Ear, Ohio State University Radio Observatory
- "Big Ears", nickname of the European Champion Clubs' Cup
- "Big ears" is a paragliding maneuvre, when the tips of the wing are collapsed.
