= 1449 in Ireland =

- Centuries: 13th; 14th; 15th; 16th; 17th
- Decades: 1420s; 1430s; 1440s; 1450s; 1460s
- See also: Other events of 1449; List of years in Ireland

Events from the year 1449 in Ireland.

== Incumbent ==
- Lord: Henry VI

== Events ==
- Richard Duke of York arrives in Ireland as Lord Lieutenant of Ireland, leading to the submission of many Irish chiefs and English rebels.

== Births ==
- 21 October – George Plantagenet, 1st Duke of Clarence, third son of Richard Plantagenet, 3rd Duke of York (d. 1478)
