= Cú Chonnacht Ó Fialáin =

15th century Irish poet

Cú Chonnacht Ó Fialáin (fl. before 1480) was a Gaelic Irish poet.

Ó Fialáin was a member of a family associated with Boho, County Fermanagh (see Bhotha Mhuintir Uí Fhialáin). John Ó Fialáin is stated in the Annals of Ulster as being the professor in poetry for the sons of Phillip Mág Uidhir upon his death in 1483.

Cú Chonnacht is primarily known for his poem, Beith ré dán dlighidh ollam ("An ollam is entitled to practice his craft"), a petition to his patron, Tomás Óg Mág Uidhir, king of Fermanagh, who reigned 1430-1471 (dying in 1480). This poem was later included in the important Irish literary compilation of 1631, the Book of O'Conor Donn (Irish: Leabhar Uí Chonchubhair Dhoinn; 'donn' or 'dhoinn' to distinguish the brown O'Conor family from the O'Conor Roe, the 'red' clan), collected on the Continent, at Ostend.
