= 1447 in Ireland =

- Centuries: 13th; 14th; 15th; 16th; 17th
- Decades: 1420s; 1430s; 1440s; 1450s; 1460s
- See also: Other events of 1447; List of years in Ireland

Events from the year 1447 in Ireland.

== Incumbent ==
- Lord: Henry VI

== Events ==
- Torna Ó Maolconaire became Ollamh Síol Muireadaigh.

== Deaths ==
- Sadhbh Ó Mailchonaire, Ban Ollamh Síol Muireadaigh.
