= 1437 in Ireland =

- Centuries: 13th; 14th; 15th; 16th; 17th
- Decades: 1410s; 1420s; 1430s; 1440s; 1450s
- See also: Other events of 1437; List of years in Ireland

Events from the year 1437 in Ireland.

== Incumbent ==
- Lord: Henry VI

== Events ==
- Treatment of Foreign Merchants Act 1437
- Last entry from Mac Carthaigh's Book
