= Bhotha Mhuintir Uí Fhialáin =

The Bhotha Mhuintir Uí Fhialáin (huts of the people of O'Phelan) were an Irish tribe that lived in the area now known as Boho in County Fermanagh, Northern Ireland.

== Etymology ==
This area is also referred to as Bothach Ui Fhialain in Breifne or mBothaigh I Fhialain in other texts.

== History of the Uí Fhialáin ==
Throughout medieval history there have been multiple references to the clan of Muintire Fialain although it is difficult to ascertain exactly when they first emerged due to the diversity of name spellings. Some historians relate this name to Felan or Faolan, which is the diminutive name for wolf.

There were seven tuaths in the time when the Maguire ruled Fermanagh. Amongst these is a reference to Flanagan (O Flannagain) who was the chief of Tuath Ratha (larger than the present area of the barony of Magheraboy) and another reference to MacLinnen or Leonard (MacGiolla Fheinnéin) over Munter Fodaghan/Muintear Fhoeadachain/Fhuadacháin/Muintir Phaeodachain .

At the battle of Disirt-da-Chrioch in 1281 (now Desertcreaght, a townland and parish in the north of the barony of Dungannon, County Tyrone), Domnall Mac Gille-Fhinnen, chief of Muinter Feodhachain was mentioned as an ally of Donnell Óg O'Donnell (Cenél Conaill) "over-lord of Fermanagh" who was subsequently defeated by the O'Neills (Cenél nEógain). This battle also resulted in the death of Domnall Mac Gille-Fhinnen, chief of Muinnter-Peodachain.

Other mentions include:

- Thirteenth century - O Fialáin and Clann Mhe Garacháin as church Termoners over Both Ui Fhialáin.
- 1310 - Cormac O Flanagan, chief of Tuath Ratha, slain by Henry Mac Gilla Finnen, chief of Muinter Feodachain.
- 1431 - the poet Eoghan O Fialain died.
- 1483 - John O Fialain ollamh in poetry to the sons of Philip Mag Uidhir and erenagh of Botha died.
- 1480 - Cú Chonnacht Ó Fialáin was referred to as a poet.
- 1585 - Toe Moynter Feodeghane referred to as containing 30 quarters of land.
- 1612 - a large termon of land was granted by Ó Flanagan to O'Felan of Bow who was the chronologer for The Maguire.
- 1608-20 - part of the land of Monter-fodoghane granted to Irish native Tirlagh Moyle Magwire.
- 1834 - According to O Donovan the Clan Mumntir Feodoacain were fast changing their name to ' Swift '.

There is a reference to a hill in the Boho area known as Craobh UÍ Fhuadacháin, a place of the "Muinntear Fhuadachain" . John O Donavan relates that the name Muintir Pheodachain and its situation of this ancient territory are yet remembered but are not clearly defined in parochial or baronial divisions just like that of Moyroe or Moyola in Derry, the remnant of an ancient Irish principality. The territory lies between Lough Mac Neane and Lough Erne and was one of the seven Tuaghs of ancient Fermanagh. Belmore mountain at his time was also called Bel Mor Muintir Pheodachain by the aborigines. There are reports of a baron Ó Fialáin having a castle in Boho.
Present day references to the Uí Fhialáin include a townland known as Kiltyfailin (Kiltyfelan) in the Cleenish civil parish (a list compiled by Wm. J. Flanagan) and the records of The Land Registration (N. Ireland 1927, record number 463) of a widow known as Phelan in the townland of Drumbeggan, Monea (religious parish Botha).

== See also ==
- Muintire-Fialain
