= Margaret O'Carroll =

Irish noblewoman

Margaret O'Carroll (also known as: Máireg Bean Uí Chonchubhair Fáilghe, Mairgréag Ní Chearbhaill, Margaret O'Connor, or Failge) was a fifteenth-century Gaelic Irish noblewoman (d. 1451 in Ireland) who was mainly remembered for her hospitality and piety. She earned the nickname Mairgréag an Einigh ('Margaret of the Hospitality') after hosting two incredible feasts in the year 1433 and went on pilgrimage to Santiago de Compostela in 1445.

== Life and family ==
Margaret O'Carroll was the daughter of Tadhg Ó Cearbhaill, chief of Ely (Éile), and Queen of the Kingdom of Uí Failghe (Offaly). Much about her early life is unknown, but it is possible that, as the child of the chief of Ely, she may have been fostered by a prominent Irish family in the area. In the early 15th century, she married Calbhach Ó Conchobhair Failghe (Calvach O'Connor Faly, d. 1458), chief of Uíbh Fhailghe (anglicized as Offaly).

Calbhach was known for being an expert at raiding. In his obituary in the Annals of the Four Masters he is called a 'man who never refused the countenance of many, and who had won more wealth from his English and Irish enemies than any lord in Leinster'.

=== Children ===
Margaret O'Carrolll had a total of seven children: 5 sons (Conn (d. 1440), Cathal (d. 1448), Feidhlim (d. 1451), Brian (d. 1452) and Tadhg (d. 1471)) and 2 daughters: Mór (d. 1452) and Fionnghuala (d. 1493).

Her daughter Fionnghuala married twice. Her first marriage was to Niall Garbh Ó Domhnaill (d. 1439), king of Tír Conaill and her second marriage was to Aodh Buidhe Ó Néill (d. 1444). A poem written c. 1425 celebrating Fionnghuala's second marriage to Aodh includes references to both her and her mother's generosity:

'...Fionnghuala's splendour is so great that no woman

can be set above her

From her girlhood - high praise! - her mother's nature shows
in her; ere she came to a husband she was pregnant with

generosity.

== Feasts ==
Margaret O'Carroll was famed for her hospitality. She was especially remembered for providing two magnificent feasts in 1433: one on 26 March at Killeigh, Offaly and one on 15 August at Rathangan, Kildare. According to the Annals of Connacht on 25 March 1433 'A general invitation was issued by Mairgreg daughter of O Cerbaill about the feast of Dasinchell this year at Killeigh, and [another] about the first festival of Mary in the autumn at Rathangan for the people who were not with her at Killeigh, so that she satisfied fully all the suppliants of Ireland'.

In an obituary for Margaret found in a seventeenth-century translation of a set of Irish annals, Duald Mac Firbis provides more elaborate details as to the events of these two feasts. According to Mac Firbis, 2,700 people were entertained at the first feast and 'Maelyn O'Maelconry one of the chiefe learned of Connaght, was the first written in that Roll and first payed and dieted or sett to super'. During the feast, Margaret stood on the battlements of the church 'clad in cloath of gold' while Calbhach was on horseback below ensuring that 'all things might be done orderly'. Margaret is also said to have fostered or nursed two orphans during this feast. The second feast that year is said to have been just as impressive as the first.

== Piety and Pilgrimage ==
In addition to her great feasts, Margaret O'Carroll also went on pilgrimage to the shrine of Saint James of Compostello in Spain in 1445. Margaret joined a group of Irish and Anglo-Irish aristocrats on this journey that included Mac Diarmada, chief of Moylurgh (Co. Roscommon), Mac Eochacáin, chief of Cemél Fiachach, O'Driscoll Óg, chief of Collybeg (south-west Co. Cork), Gerald Fitzgerald and Eibhlin fitz Thomas Ó Fearghail. Only Margaret, Mac Diarmada and Mac Eochacáin made the trip safely. Both Gerald Fitzgerald and Eibhlin fitz Thomas Ó Gearghail died in Spain and O'Driscoll Óg died at sea on the journey back to Ireland.

In addition to her pilgrimage, Margaret commissioned the making of a number of roads, bridges, churches and missals in order 'to serve God and her soule'.

== Politics ==
On her way back from Santiago de Compostela in 1445, Margaret also managed to negotiate a prisoner exchange between the Gaelic Irish and their English neighbors in Meath. A number of Gaelic Irish, including Mac Eochacáin of Cenél Fiachach, his son and Art Ó Máelachain's grandson, had been taken prisoner by the English while in the company of the Baron of Dealbhna. In order to secure their freedom, Margaret released a number of English prisoners being held by her husband and brought them to Trim Castle to make the exchange. The sources suggest that she acted without advising Calbhach of her plans.

== Patronage ==
Máireg was famous in her day as a patron of bardic classes of Ireland.

== Death ==
Margaret became an Augustinian canoness at nearby Killeigh, shortly before she died of breast cancer in 1451. Her death in 1451 was greeted with sadness by those whom she patronised. The chronicler of the Annals of Connacht remarked that she was "the best woman of the Gaedil and the one who made the most causeways, churches, books, chalices and all articles useful for the service of a church ... she died of a cancer in the breast this year ... the darling of all the Leinster people" (do ec do galur cigí in hoc anno)." However, later in the same passage it is stated that she actually "died of a disease which is not fitting to mention with her, namely leprosy." This might be as a result of confusion in the original text, as her son, Feidlim, is also stated to have died in the same year.

She appears to have been buried in Killeigh, where her husband was buried after his death in 1458. She was survived by at least four children: Conn, who became king and reigned till 1474; Cáthaoir; two other sons who were captured with Cáthaoir in 1476 by Conn for rebellion; and at least one daughter.

== Legacy ==
In the nineteenth and early twentieth century a number of noted historians began to take an interest in the life of Margaret O'Carroll. Elizabeth Owens Blackburne, author of the romanticized book Illustrious Irishwomen (1877), described Margaret as a '...high-bred and high-spirited gentle-woman' and a 'woman of remarkable spirit and capacity'. She was the subject of two poems by Thomas D'Arcy McGee (d. 1868) and is described as a 'woman of culture and large mind, who loved and appreciated the society of the learned' by L. M. McCrait in his 1913 essay.

== Bibliography ==
- Bitel, Lisa M. (January 2004). "Women and the Church in Medieval Ireland, c. 1140-1540 (review)". The Catholic Historical Review. The Catholic University of America Press. ISSN 0008-8080.
- Kenny, Gillian (2007). Anglo-Irish and Gaelic Women in Ireland, c. 1170-1540. Dublin, Ireland; Portland, OR: Four Courts Press. p. 218. ISBN 978-1-85182-984-2.
