= Taghairm =

Scottish mode of divination

Taghairm was a historical Scottish Gaelic mode of divination. Several kinds of taghairm are described; each seemed to involve summoning spirits and entering altered states of consciousness.

In A Description of the Western Islands of Scotland (1703 and 1716), Scottish writer Màrtainn MacGille Mhàrtainn describes the ways of consulting spirits in the Hebrides during the 17th century. One involved a man being wrapped in a bull hide, with only his head outside of it, to sit in a wild and lonely spot overnight, in order to divine wisdom. Another was to swing the man (with no bullhide mentioned) against a boundary riverbank; it was thought that invisible "friends" would come and answer questions for him. A third version of taghairm was quite different from the others and involved animal sacrifice (of cats).

An 1825 text described the taghairm:

The divination by the taghairm was once a noted superstition among the Gael, and in the northern parts of the Lowlands of Scotland. When any important question concerning futurity arose, and of which a solution was, by all means, desirable, some shrewder person than his neighbours was pitched upon, to perform the part of a prophet. This person was wrapped in the warm smoking hide of a newly-slain ox or cow, commonly an ox, and laid at full length in the wildest recess of some lonely waterfall. The question was then put to him, and the oracle was left in solitude to consider it. Here he lay for some hours with his cloak of knowledge around him, and over his head, no doubt, to see the better into futurity; deafened by the incessant roaring of the torrent; every sense assailed; his body steaming; his fancy was in ferment; and whatever notion had found its way into his mind from so many sources of prophecy, it was firmly believed to have been communicated by invisible beings who were supposed to haunt such solitudes.

There is a similar description of the taghairm being carried out in Trotternish in a 1772 account, and a number of closely matching accounts with hides and waterfalls can also be found, with some additionally including the diviner being beaten for a while with a pole or a staff after being covered by the animal skin.

According to the London Literary Gazette of March 1824, one form of the taghairm involved a group of people spending four days roasting cats alive, one cat after another, without eating. This was meant to summon a legion of demons in the shape of screeching black cats, with their master at their head, who would grant them two wishes. The last ceremony of this kind was said to have been performed on the Isle of Mull at the beginning of the 17th century. The ritual is described in Gustav Meyrink’s book on John Dee, The Angel of the West Window.

Scottish historical novelist Sir Walter Scott scornfully described a third method in a footnote to his influential poem Lady of the Lake. He further adds that it could involve another situation "where the scenery around him suggested nothing but objects of horror." However, Scott could not speak Scottish Gaelic and his concepts of Gaelic culture were sometimes distorted.

== Other regions ==
The animal skin and waterfall method of divination was also known in Wales.

== See also ==
- Imbas forosnai
