= Ollamh Connachta =

Ollamh Connachta was the highest professional level recognised for a poet, historian or lawyer within the province.

== Annals ==
- 1413:Be Binn, daughter of Maelsechlainn son of Muirgius Mac Donnchada and wife of Master Matha Mac in Oclaig, died.
- 1416:Tomas Mac ind Oclaig, erenagh of Killery and chief master of Law in Connacht, died after a victory of repentance.

== See also ==
- Ollamh Érenn
- Ollamh Clanricarde - 1438.3:Conchobar Mac Aedacain, ollav of Macwilliam of Clanrickard, died.
- Ollamh Ui Fiachrach - 1414:Donnchad Mac Fir Bisig, prospective ollav of the Ui Fiachrach Muaide, died this year.

== Sources ==
- The Encyclopaedia of Ireland 2003; ISBN 0-7171-3000-2.
- Mac Dermot of Moylurg: The Story of a Connacht Family Dermot Mac Dermot, 1996.
- A New History of Ireland VIII: A Chronology of Irish History to 1976 - A Companion to Irish History Part I edited by T.W. Moody, F.X. Martin and F.J. Byrne, 1982. ISBN 0-19-821744-7
- The Celebrated Antiquary Nollaig O Muralie, Maynooth, 1996.
- Irish Leaders and Learning Through the Ages Fr. Paul Walsh, 2004. (ed. Nollaig O Muralie).
