= Muintire-Fialain =

Muintire-Fialain is an ancient Irish tribe who lived in the area known as Botha in the Barony of Magheraboy and Clanawley, now known as Boho, which is in County Fermanagh. This is also synonymous with their origins in Bhotha Mhuintir Uí Fhialáin.
