= Cormac Ó Domhnalláin =

Irish historian and poet (died 1436)

Cormac Ó Domhnalláin, Ollamh Síol Muireadaigh, died 1436.

The Annals of Connacht state:

1436:Cormac O Domnallain, ollav of the Sil Murray in Poetry, died.

== Sources ==
- The Encyclopaedia of Ireland 2003; ISBN 0-7171-3000-2.
- Mac Dermot of Moylurg: The Story of a Connacht Family Dermot Mac Dermot, 1996.
- A New History of Ireland VIII: A Chronology of Irish History to 1976 - A Companion to Irish History Part I edited by T.W. Moody, F.X. Martin and F.J. Byrne, 1982. ISBN 0-19-821744-7
- The Celebrated Antiquary Nollaig O Muralie, Maynooth, 1996.
- Irish Leaders and Learning Through the Ages Fr. Paul Walsh, 2004. (ed. Nollaig O Muralie).

Preceded by Dauid mac Tanaide Ó Maolconaire	Ollamh Síol Muireadaigh; 1419-1436	Succeeded by Mailin mac Tanaide Ó Maolconaire
