= Early Irish literature =

Irish literature up to 15th century

Early Irish literature, is commonly dated from the 4th or 6th to the 15th century, a period during which modern literature in Irish began to emerge. It stands as one of the oldest vernacular literature in Western Europe, with its roots extending back to late antiquity, as evident from inscriptions utilizing both Irish and Latin found on Ogham stones dating as early as the 4th century. The early Irish literary tradition flourished through the Medieval Irish period, and its literary output showcases a blend of indigenous storytelling, myth, and historical narratives. Notably, this period saw the development of a full-scale vernacular written literature expressed in a diverse range of literary genres.

According to Professor Elva Johnston, "the Irish were apparently the first western European people to develop a full-scale vernacular written literature expressed in a range of literary genres." A significant aspect of early Irish literature is the influence of loan words from other Indo-European languages, including but not limited to Latin and Greek. This linguistic exchange is evidenced in texts like Sanas Cormaic, a glossary dating from the 9th century that illustrates the assimilation of foreign words into the Irish language. Two of the earliest examples of literature from an Irish perspective are Saint Patrick's Confessio and Letter to Coroticus, written in Latin some time in the 5th century, and preserved in the Book of Armagh.

== The earliest Irish authors ==
It is unclear when literacy first came to Ireland. The earliest Irish writings are inscriptions, mostly simple memorials, on stone in the Ogham alphabet, the earliest of which date to the 4th century. The Latin alphabet was in use by 431, when the fifth century Gaulish chronicler Prosper of Aquitaine records that Palladius was sent by Pope Celestine I as the first bishop to the Irish believers in Christ. Pelagius, an influential British heretic who taught in Rome in the early 5th century, fragments of whose writings survive, is said by Jerome to have been of Irish descent. Coelius Sedulius, the 5th century author of the Carmen Paschale, who has been called the "Virgil of theological poetry", was probably also Irish: the 9th-century Irish geographer Dicuil calls him noster Sedulius ("our Sedulius"), and the Latin name Sedulius usually translates to the Irish name Siadal.

Two works written by Saint Patrick, his Confessio ("Declaration", a brief autobiography intended to justify his activities to the church in Britain) and Epistola ("Letter", condemning the raiding and slaving activities in Ireland of a British king, Coroticus), survive. They were written in Latin some time in the 5th century, and preserved in the Book of Armagh, dating to around 812, and a number of later manuscripts. The 6th-century saint Colum Cille is known to have written, but only one work which may be his has survived: the psalter known as the Cathach or "Book of Battles", now in the Royal Irish Academy. Another important early writer in Latin is Columbanus (543-615), a missionary from Leinster who founded several monasteries in continental Europe, from whose hand survive sermons, letters and monastic rules, as well as poetry attributed to him whose authenticity is uncertain. The earliest identifiable writer in the Irish language is Dallán Forgaill, who wrote Amra Coluim Chille, a poetic elegy to Colum Cille, shortly after the subject's death in 597. The Amra is written in archaic Old Irish and is not perfectly understood. It is preserved in heavily annotated versions in manuscripts from the 12th century on. Only a little later, in the early 7th century, Luccreth moccu Chiara, a Kerryman, wrote poems recording the legendary origins of Munster dynasties, including Conailla Medb michuru ("Medb enjoined illegal contracts"), which contains the oldest surviving reference to characters and events from the Ulster Cycle.

== The Old Irish glosses ==
The oldest surviving manuscripts containing examples of the written Irish language date to the 8th century. Their Irish contents consist of glosses written between the lines or on the margins of religious works in Latin, most of them preserved in monasteries in Switzerland, Germany, France, and Italy, having been taken there by early Irish missionaries, and where, not being understood, they were rarely consulted and did not wear out, unlike their counterparts in Ireland. They are thus quite different from manuscripts with significant Irish language content preserved in Ireland, the oldest of which is the Book of Armagh (c. 812). The early glosses, though of little interest outside of philology, show the wide learning of the commentators and the extraordinary development, even at that early period, of the language in which they wrote. Their language and style, says Kuno Meyer, stand on a high level in comparison with those of the Old High German glosses. "We find here", he writes, "a fully-formed learned prose style which allows even the finest shades of thought to be easily and perfectly expressed, from which we must conclude that there must have been a long previous culture [of the language] going back at the very least to the beginning of the sixth century". The glosses are to be found in manuscripts from Würzburg, St. Gallen, Karlsruhe, Milan, Turin, Sankt Paul im Lavanttal, and elsewhere. The Liber Hymnorum and the Stowe Missal are, after the glosses and the Book of Armagh, perhaps the most ancient manuscripts in which Irish is written. They date from about 900 to 1050.

== Existing manuscript literature ==
The oldest books of miscellaneous literature are Lebor na hUidre, or "Book of the Dun Cow", transcribed about 1100, and the Book of Leinster, which dates from about fifty years later. These books are great miscellaneous literary collections. After them come many valuable vellums. The date at which these manuscripts were penned is no criterion of the date at which their contents were first written, for many of them contain literature which, from the ancient forms of words and other indications, must have been committed to writing at least as early as the 7th century. We cannot carry these pieces further back with firm certainty using linguistic methods, but it is evident from their contents that many of them must have been orally transmitted for centuries before they were committed to writing. A 17th-century manuscript may sometimes give a more correct version of a 7th-century piece than a vellum many centuries older.

The exact number of Irish manuscripts still existing has never been accurately determined, however its estimated that only over 300 medieval manuscripts exist currently with over 3000 lost. The number in the Royal Irish Academy, Dublin, alone is enormous, estimated to be about fifteen hundred. O'Curry, O'Longan, and O'Beirne catalogued a little more than half the manuscripts in the Academy, and the catalogue filled thirteen volumes containing 3448 pages; to these an alphabetic index of the pieces contained was made in three volumes, and an index of the principal names, in addition to some other material in thirteen volumes more. From an examination of these books one may roughly calculate that the pieces catalogued would number about eight or ten thousand, varying from long epic sagas to single quatrains or stanzas, and yet there remains a great deal more to be indexed, a work which after a delay of very many years is happily now at last in process of accomplishment. The Library of Trinity College, Dublin, also contains a great number of valuable manuscripts of all ages, many of them vellums. The British Museum, the Bodleian Library at Oxford University, the Advocates Library in Edinburgh, and the Bibliothèque Royale in Brussels are all repositories of a large number of valuable manuscripts.

From what is known of the contents of the existing manuscripts the following rough classification of the literature contained in them may be set down. The oldest literature are the ancient epics dating substantially from pagan times, probably first written down in the seventh century or even earlier. These epics generally contain verses of poetry and often whole poems, just as in the case of the French chantefable, Aucassin et Nicollet. After the substantial pagan efforts the early Christian literature came. This includes the lives of saints, visions, homilies, commentaries on the Scriptures, monastic rules, prayers, hymns, and all possible kinds of religious and didactic poetry. Apart from these works the ancient annals were written too. There also exists a great mass of genealogical books, tribal histories, and semi-historical romances. Even later the bardic poetry of Ireland was written, the poetry of the hereditary poets attached to the great Gaelic families and the provincial kings. This genre of poetry was written from the 9th century down to the 17th. In the high middle ages the Brehon Laws and other legal treaties were written. In the same time period an enormous quantity of writings on Irish and Latin grammar, glossaries of words, metrical tracts, astronomical, geographical, and medical works was written too. Again in this time period many translations from classical and medieval literature were written, such as translations from Lucan's Bellum Civile, Bede's Historica Ecclesiastica, Mandeville's Travels, Arthurian romances and other books.

The 1913 Catholic Encyclopedia remarks on the lack of epic poetry and of drama in the corpus of early Irish literature.

=== Early Irish epic or saga ===
In Ireland, the prose epic or saga developed, and kept on developing, for well over a thousand years. In the Book of Leinster, a manuscript of the middle 12th century, we find a list of the names of 187 epic sagas. The ollam, or arch-poet, who was the highest dignitary among the poets, and whose training lasted for some twelve years, was obliged to learn two hundred and fifty of these prime sagas and one hundred secondary ones.

The manuscripts themselves divide these prime sagas into the following categories, from the very names of which we may get a glance of the genius of the early Gael, and form some conception of the tragic nature of his epic: Destruction of Fortified Places, Cow Spoils (i.e., cattle-raids), Courtships or Wooings, Battles, Stories of Caves, Navigations, Tragical Deaths, Feasts, Sieges, Adventures of Travel, Elopements, Slaughters, Water-eruptions, Expeditions, Progresses, and Visions. "He is no poet", says the Book of Leinster, "who does not synchronize and harmonize all these stories."

In addition to the names of 187 sagas in that book, more names occur in the 10th or 11th century tale of MacCoise. All the known ones—except for one added later, and another with a transcription error—refer to events prior to 650 or thereabouts. Apparently then, the list was drawn up in the 7th century.

Due to the extended period of oral transmission, the authorship of the sagas is unclear, as is the degree to which they represent real events.

It seems certain that as soon as Christianity pervaded the island and bardic schools and colleges formed alongside the monasteries, no class of learning was more popular than studying the great traditional doings, exploits, and tragedies of the various Irish tribes, families, and races. The peregrinations of the bards and communication among their colleges must have propagated throughout Ireland any local traditions worthy of preservation. These stories embodied the essence of the island's national life, but only a few of their enormous number survive, and most of these are mutilated or preserved in mere digests.

Some, however, survive at nearly full length. These ancient vellums, however, probably don't tell the same exact tales as did the professional poet, for the poets didn't write them. Generally, early Christian monks recorded the tales. They took interest and pride in preserving early memorials of their people. They cultivated the native language to such a degree that at an early period it was used alongside Latin, and soon almost displaced it, even in the Church itself.

This patriotism of the Irish monks and early cultivation of the vernacular are remarkable, since it was the reverse of what took place in the rest of Europe. Elsewhere, the Church used Latin as a principal means of destroying native and pagan tradition.

The Northmen inflicted irrevocable losses on the Irish from the end of the 8th to the middle of the 11th century—followed by the ravages of the Norman invasion of Ireland, and the later and more ruthless destructions by the Elizabethan and Cromwellian English. Despite those tragic and violent cultural wounds, O'Curry could assert that he knew of 4,000 large quarto pages of strictly historical tales. He computes that tales of the Ossianic and Fenian cycles would fill 3,000 more and that, in addition to these, miscellaneous and imaginative cycles that are neither historical nor Fenian, would fill 5,000.

== Pagan literature and Christian sentiment ==
The bulk of the ancient stories and some of the ancient poems were probably committed to writing by monks of the 7th century, but are substantially pagan in origin, conception, and colouring. Yet there is scarcely one of them in which some Christian allusion to heaven, or hell, or the Deity, or some Biblical subject, does not appear. This is likely because, when Christianity displaced paganism, in a tacit compromise, sympathetic clerics let the bard, fili (poet), and the representative of the old pagan learning propagate their stories, tales, poems, and genealogies—at the price of a little Christian admixture. So respectful is the dovetailing of the Christian into the pagan in most of the oldest romances, that even casual analysis easily separates the pieces. The pagan substratum stands forth entirely distinct from the Christian addition. For example, in the evidently pagan saga called the Wooing of Étaín, we find the description of the pagan paradise given its literary passport by a cunningly interwoven allusion to Adam's fall. Étaín was the wife of one of the Tuatha Dé Danann, who were gods. She is reborn as a mortal—the pagan Irish seem to have believed in metempsychosis—and weds the king of Ireland. Her former husband of the Tuatha Dé Danann still loves her, follows her into life as a mortal, and tries to win her back by singing a captivating description of the glowing unseen land to which he would lure her. "O lady fair, wouldst thou come with me," he cries "...to the wondrous land that is ours?" He describes how, "..the crimson of the foxglove is in every brake—a beauty of land the land I speak of. Youth never grows into old age there, warm sweet streams traverse the country..." etc. Then the evidently pagan description of this land of the gods is made passable by an added verse that adroitly tells us that, though the inhabitants of this glorious country saw everyone, nobody saw them, "...because the cloud of Adam's wrongdoing has concealed us."

This easy analysis of the early Irish literature into its pre-Christian and post-Christian elements lends an absorbing interest and a great value in the history of European thought. For, when all Christian additions are removed, we find a picture of pagan life in Europe that we can't find elsewhere. "The church adopted [in Ireland] towards Pagan sagas the same position that it adopted toward Pagan law [...] I see no reasons for doubting that really genuine pictures of a pre-Christian culture are preserved to us in the individual sagas. "The saga originated in Pagan and was propagated in Christian times, and that too without its seeking fresh nutriment, as a rule, from Christian elements. But we must ascribe it to the influence of Christianity that what is specifically pagan in Irish saga is shifted into the background. And yet there exist many whose contents are plainly mythological. The Christian monks were certainly not the first who reduced the ancient sagas to fixed form. but later on they copied them faithfully and promulgated them after Ireland had been converted to Christianity".

== Irish literature and early Europe ==
When it is understood that the ancient Irish sagas record, even though it be in a more or less distorted fashion, in some cases reminiscences of a past mythology, and in others real historical events, dating from the pagan times, then it needs only a moment's reflection to realize their value. Zimmer writes that nothing except a spurious criticism that "...takes for original and primitive the most palpable nonsense of which Middle-Irish writers from the Twelfth to the Sixteenth century are guilty with regard to their own antiquity, which is in many respects strange and foreign to them, nothing but such a criticism can on the other hand make the attempt to doubt of the historical character of the chief persons of the saga cycles. For we believe that Méve, Conor MacNessa, Cuchulainn, and Fionn mac Cumhaill (Cool) are just as much historical personalities as Arminius or Dietrich of Berne or Etzel, and their date is just as well determined." The first three of these lived in the 1st century BC, and Finn in the 2nd or 3rd century. D'Arbois de Jubainville expresses himself to the same effect. "We have no reason", he writes, "to doubt the reality of the principal rôle in this [cycle of Cuchulainn]"; and of the story of the Boru tribute imposed on Leinster in the 1st century he writes: "The story has real facts for a basis though certain details may have been created by the imagination"; and again, "Irish epic story, barbarous though it be, is, like Irish law, a monument of a civilization far superior to that of the most ancient Germans".

"Ireland in fact," writes M. Darmesteter in his English Studies, which summarize conclusions he derives from the works of the great Celtic scholars, "...has the peculiar privilege of a history continuous from the earliest centuries of our era to the present days. She has preserved in the infinite wealth of her literature a complete and faithful picture of the ancient civilization of the Celts. Irish literature is therefore the key which opens the Celtic world." But the Celtic world means a large portion of Europe and the key to its past history can be found at present nowhere else than in the Irish manuscripts. Without them we would have to view the past history of a great part of Europe through that distorting medium, the coloured glasses of the Greeks and Romans, to whom all outer nations were barbarians, into whose social life they had no motive for inquiring. Apart from Irish literature we would have no means of estimating what were the feelings, modes of life, manners, and habits of those great Celtic races who once possessed so large a part of the ancient world, Gaul, Belgium, North Italy, parts of Germany, Spain, Switzerland, and the British Isles, who burnt Rome, plundered Greece, and colonized Asia Minor. But in the ancient epics of Ireland we find another standard by which to measure, and through this early Irish medium we get a clear view of the life and manners of the race in one of its strongholds, and we find many characteristic customs of the continental Celts, which are just barely mentioned or alluded to by Greek and Roman writers, reappearing in all the circumstance and expansion of saga-telling.

Of such is the custom of the "Hero's Bit" Posidonius mentions, which provides the foundation for one of the most famous Irish sagas, Bricriu's Feast. The Irish sagas repeatedly refer to the chariot, which became obsolete in Gaul a couple of hundred years before Caesar's invasion. In the greatest of the epic cycles, the warriors always fight from chariots. We find, as Diodorus Siculus mentions, that the bards had power to make battles cease by interposing with song between the combatants. Caesar says (Gallic War, 6.14) the Gaulish druids spent twenty years in studying and learned a great number of verses, but Irish literature tells us what the arch-poet, probably the counterpart of the Gaulish druid, actually did learn. "The manners and customs in which the men of the time lived and moved are depicted," writes Windisch, "...with a naive realism which leaves no room for doubt as to the former actuality of the scenes depicted. In matter of costume and weapons, eating and drinking, building and arrangement of the banqueting hall, manners observed at the feasts and much more, we find here the most valuable information." (Ir. Texte I, 252). "I insist," he says elsewhere, "..that Irish saga is the only richly-flowing source of unbroken Celtism." "It is the ancient Irish language," says d'Arbois de Jubainville, "that forms the connecting point between the neo-Celtic languages and the Gaulish of the inscribed stones, coins, and proper names preserved in Greek and Roman literature."

It is evident that those of the great Continental nations of today, whose ancestors were mostly Celtic—but whose language, literature, and traditions have completely disappeared—must, to study their own past, turn to Ireland.

== The principal saga cycles ==
There are four great cycles in Irish story-telling, not all of which fully survive. Professor John Th. Honti stated that many of these Irish sagas show "a nucleus" that appear in "some later European folk-tale".

=== Mythological Cycle ===
The Mythological Cycle dealt with the Tuatha Dé Danann, the gods of good, and the Fomorians, gods of darkness and evil, and giving us, under the apparently early history of the various races that colonised Ireland, really a distorted early Celtic pantheon. According to these accounts, the Nemedians first seized upon the islands and were oppressed by the Fomorians, who are described as African sea-robbers; these races nearly exterminated each other at the fight round Conand's Tower on Tory Island. Some of the Nemedians escaped to Greece and came back a couple of hundred years later calling themselves Fir Bolg. Others of the Nemedians who escaped came back later, calling themselves the Tuatha Dé Danann. These last fought the battle of North Moytura and beat the Fir Bolg. They fought the battle of South Moytura later and beat the Fomorians. They held the island until the Gaels, also called Milesians or Scoti, came in and vanquished them. Good sagas about both of these battles are preserved, each existing in only a single copy. Nearly all the rest of this most interesting cycle has been lost or is to be found merely in condensed summaries. These mythological pieces dealt with people, dynasties, and probably the struggle between good and evil principles. There is over it all a sense of vagueness and uncertainty.

=== Ulster Cycle ===
The Ulster Cycle (Irish: an Rúraíocht), formerly known as the Red Branch Cycle, one of the four great cycles of Irish mythology, is a body of medieval Irish heroic legends and sagas of the traditional heroes of the Ulaid in what is now eastern Ulster and northern Leinster, particularly counties Armagh, Down and Louth.

The Ulster Cycle stories are set in and around the reign of King Conchobar mac Nessa, who rules the Ulaid from Emain Macha (now Navan Fort near Armagh). The most prominent hero of the cycle is Conchobar's nephew, Cú Chulainn. The Ulaid are most often in conflict with the Connachta, led by their queen, Medb, her husband, Ailill, and their ally Fergus mac Róich, a former king of the Ulaid in exile. The longest and most important story of the cycle is the Táin Bó Cúailnge or Cattle Raid of Cooley, in which Medb raises an enormous army to invade the Cooley peninsula and steal the Ulaid's prize bull, Donn Cúailnge, opposed only by the seventeen-year-old Cú Chulainn. In the Mayo Táin, the Táin Bó Flidhais it is a white cow known as the 'Maol' that is the object of desire, for she can give enough milk at one milking to feed an army. Perhaps the best known story is the tragedy of Deirdre, source of plays by W. B. Yeats and J. M. Synge. Other stories tell of the births, courtships and deaths of the characters and of the conflicts between them.

=== Fenian Cycle ===
After the Red Branch or heroic cycle we find a very comprehensive and even more popular body of romance woven round Fionn Mac Cumhaill, his son Oisín, and his grandson Oscar, in the reigns of the High Kings Conn of the Hundred Battles, his son Art Oénfer, and his grandson Cormac mac Airt, in the second and third centuries. This cycle of romance is usually called the Fenian cycle because it deals so largely with Fionn Mac Cumhaill and his fianna (militia). These, according to Irish historians, were a body of Irish janissaries maintained by the Irish kings for the purpose of guarding their coasts and fighting their battles, but they ended by fighting the king himself and were destroyed by the famous Battle of Gabhra. As the heroic cycle is often called the Ulster cycle, so this is also known as the Leinster cycle of sagas, because it may have had its origin, as MacNeill has suggested, amongst the Galeoin, a non-Milesian tribe and subject race, who dwelt around the Hill of Allen in Leinster. This whole body of romance is of later growth or rather expresses a much later state of civilization than the Cúchulainn stories. There is no mention of fighting in chariots, of the Hero's Bit, or of many other characteristics that mark the antiquity of the Ulster cycle. Very few pieces belonging to the Fionn story occur in Old Irish, and the great mass of texts is of Middle and Late Irish growth. The extension of the story to all the Gaelic-speaking parts of the kingdom is placed by MacNeill between the years 400 and 700; up to this time it was (as the product of a vassal race) propagated only orally. Various parts of the Fionn saga seem to have developed in different quarters of the country, that about Diarmuid Ua Duibhne in South Munster, and that about Goll mac Morna in Connacht. Certain it is that this cycle was by far the most popular and widely spread of the three, being familiarly known in every part of Ireland and of Gaelic-speaking Scotland even to the present day. It developed also in a direction of its own, for though none of the heroic tales are wholly in verse, yet the number of Ossianic epopees, ballads, and poems is enormous, amounting to probably some 50,000 lines, mostly in the more modern language.

=== Historical cycle ===
It was part of the duty of the medieval Irish bards, or court poets, to record the history of the family and the genealogy of the king they served. This they did in poems that blended the mythological and the historical to a greater or lesser degree. The resulting stories form what has come to be known as the Historical Cycle, or more correctly Cycles, as there are a number of independent groupings.

The kings that are included range from the almost entirely mythological Labraid Loingsech, who allegedly became High King of Ireland around 431 BC, to the entirely historical Brian Boru. However, the greatest glory of the Historical Cycle is the Buile Shuibhne (The Frenzy of Sweeney), a 12th-century tale told in verse and prose. Suibhne, king of Dál nAraidi, was cursed by St Ronan and became a kind of half man, half bird, condemned to live out his life in the woods, fleeing from his human companions. The story has captured the imaginations of contemporary Irish poets and has been translated by Trevor Joyce and Seamus Heaney.

== Early Christian literature ==
Perhaps no country that ever adopted Christianity was so thoroughly and rapidly permeated and perhaps saturated with its language and concepts as was Ireland. It adopted and made its own in secular life scores and hundreds of words originally used by the Church for ecclesiastical purposes. Even to the present day we find in Irish words like póg, borrowed from the Latin for "[the kiss] of peace", pac[is], Old Irish póc. From the same root comes baitheas, "the crown of the head", i.e. the baptized part. A common word for warrior, or hero, laich, now laoch, is simply from laicus, a layman. The Latin language was, of course, the one used for religious purposes, both in prose and verse, for some time after the introduction of Christianity. In it were written the earliest hymns: Saint Patrick used it in his Confession, as did Adomnán in his "Life of Columcille". But already by the middle of the 8th century the native language had largely displaced it all over Ireland as a medium for religious thought, for homilies, for litanies, books of devotion, and the lives of saints.

We find the Irish language used in a large religious literature, much of which is native, some of which represents lost Latin originals now known to us only in Irish translations. One interesting development in this class of literature is the visions-literature beginning with the vision of St. Fursa, which is given at some length by Bede, and of which Sir Francis Palgrave states that, "Tracing the course of thought upwards we have no difficulty in deducing the poetic genealogy of Dante's Inferno to the Milesian Fursæus." These "visions" were very popular in Ireland, and so numerous they gave rise to the parody, the 12th century Aislinge Meic Con Glinne. More important than these, however, are the lives of the saints, because many of them, dating back to a very remote period, throw a great deal of light on the manners of the early Irish. In the first half of the 17th century Brother Michael O'Cleary, a Franciscan, travelled round Ireland and made copies of between thirty and forty lives of Irish saints, which are still preserved in the Burgundian library at Brussels. Nine, at least, exist elsewhere in ancient vellums. A part of one of them, the voyage of St. Brendan, spread all through Europe, but the Latin version is much more complete than any existing Irish one, the original having likely been lost.

== Irish historical literature ==
Owing to the nature of the case, and considering the isolation of Ireland, it is extremely difficult, or rather impossible, to procure independent foreign testimony, to the truth of Irish annals. But, although such testimony is denied us, yet there happily exists another kind of evidence to which we may appeal with comparative confidence. This is nothing less than the records of natural phenomena reported in the annals, for if it can be shown by calculating backwards, as modern science has enabled us to do, that such natural phenomena as the appearance of comets or the occurrence of eclipses are recorded to the day and hour by the annalists, then we can also say with something like certainty that these phenomena were recorded at their appearance by writers who personally observed them, and whose writings must have been actually consulted and seen by these later annalists whose books we now possess. If we take, let us say, the Annals of Ulster, which treat of Ireland and Irish history from about the year 444, but of which the written copy dates only from the 15th century, we see from the years 496 to 884 as many as eighteen records of eclipses and comets, and all these agree exactly with modern astronomy. How impossible it is to keep such records unless written memoranda are made at the time by eyewitnesses is shown by the fact that Bede, born in 675, in recording the great solar eclipse that took place only eleven years before his own birth, is yet two days astray in his date; while on the other hand the Annals of Ulster give, not only the correct day, but the correct hour, thus showing that their compiler, Cathal Maguire, had access either to the original, or a copy of an original, account by an eyewitness. Whenever any side-lights have been thrown from an external quarter on the Irish annals, either from Cymric, Saxon, or Continental sources, they have always tended to show their accuracy. We may take it then without any credulity on our part, that Irish history as recorded in the annals may be pretty well relied upon from the 4th century onward.

The first scholar whom we know to have written connected annals was Tighearnach, Abbott of Clonmacnoise, who died in 1088. He began in Latin with the founding of Rome; later on he makes occasional mention of Irish affairs, and lays it down that Irish history is not to be trusted before the reign of Cimbaed, that is, prior to about the year 300 BC, Omnia monimeta Scotorum [the Irish were always called Scotti till into the late Middle Ages] usque Cimbaed incerta erant. In the 4th century BC the references to Ireland become fuller and more numerous, they are partly in Latin, partly in Irish, but towards the end of the work Latin gives way to the native speech. The greatest book of annals, with a few trifling exceptions also the latest, is known under the title of the "Four Masters". It is evident from the entries that the compilers of the "annals of Ulster" and the rest copied from ancient originals. In the "Annals of Ulster" for instance, we read under the year 439 Chronicon magnum scriptum est, at the years 467 and 468 the compiler writes sic in libro Cuanach inveni, at 482 ut Cuana scriptsit, at 507 secundum librum Mochod, at 628 sicut in libro Dubhdaleithe narratur, etc. No nation in Europe can boast of so continuous and voluminous a history preserved in a vernacular literature. The only surviving history of Ireland as distinguished from annals was written by Geoffrey Keating, a learned priest, in the first half of the 17th century. It also is taken, almost exclusively, from the old vellum manuscripts then surviving, but that mostly perished, as Keating no doubt foresaw they would, in the cataclysm of the Cromwellian wars.

== Early Irish poetry ==
Early Irish poetry is one of the oldest vernacular poetic traditions. The oldest poems were written down from an oral tradition that was very strong in early Irish culture. It was during the 4th century that the oral literature was first written down in the monasteries. Most of those texts have not been preserved and were destroyed in the Viking invasions. The surviving poetic texts date from c. 650 AD and end in the 12th century, when a new literary order emerged. The poetry of this time may be roughly divided into two categories – that of the professional bard attached to the court and person of a chief; and that of the unattached poet, whether monk or itinerant bard. The poetry was written in Latin and Old Irish. Among the few surviving Old Irish poems is Pangur Bán, written by a monk probably in Reichenau Abbey shortly after the year 800.

The earliest Irish poetry was unrhymed. Little distinguishes it from prose, except for a strong tendency, as in the Germanic languages, towards alliteration and syllabic verse. They are also so ancient as to be unintelligible without heavy glosses. By the 7th century, Irish poetry had developed rhyming verses, centuries before most of the vernacular literatures of Europe. Irish poetry did not emphasise only full rhymes, but also assonance, and internal rhyme was seen as of possibly greater importance than end rhyme. The following Latin verses, written some time prior to the year 704, demonstrate internal rhyming:

Martinus mirus more
Ore laudavit Deum,
Puro Corde cantavit
Atque amavit Eum.

An interesting peculiarity of certain Old Irish verse is a desire to end a second line with a word that is one syllable more than that which ends the first, the stress of the voice being thrown back a syllable in the last word of the second line. Thus, if the first line ends with an stressed monosyllable, the second line will end with a disyllabic word stressed on its first syllable, or if the first line ends with a disyllable stressed on its penultimate the second line will end with a trisyllable stressed on its ante-penultimate. This is called airdrinn in Irish, as:

Fall'n the land of learned mén
The bardic band is fállen,
None now learn a song to síng
For long our fern is fáding.

This metre is named Deibhidhe, and illustrates in the last two lines the internal rhyme to which is referred. Linguist Rudolf Thurneysen maintains that if the Irish rhyming verses were derived from the Latins, it seems necessary to account for the peculiar forms that so much of this verse assumed in Irish, for early Irish verse has many unique qualities, like this airdrinn, which cannot have been derived from Latin.

There were two kinds of poets of ancient Irish society. the highest of those was called the filè; the lowest the bard. There were seven grades of filès, the most exalted being called an ollamh. These last were so highly esteemed that the annals often give their obituaries, as though they were princes. It took from twelve to twenty years to arrive at this dignity. Some fragments of the old metrical textbooks still exist, showing the courses required from the various grades of poets, in pre-Norse times. By contrast, only one thing was required of a bard; natural ability. There were sixteen grades of bards, each with a different name, and each had its own unique metres (of which the Irish had over 300).

== See also ==
- Irish literature
- Irish mythology
- Ogham
