= Ollamh Clanricarde =

Ollamh Clanricarde was a hereditary post, held almost exclusively by members of the McEgan family.

An ollamh was the highest rank in the learned orders of law, poetry, or history. These educated professionals, today grouped together in the popular consciousness as "bards", maintained an oral tradition that pre-dated Christianization of Ireland. Clanricarde was a territory located in south Connacht.

- 1438: Conchobar Mac Aedacain, ollav of Macwilliam of Clanrickard, died.

== See also ==
- Ollamh Érenn
- Ollamh Tuisceairt
- Ollamh Airgialla
- Ollamh Ulaidh
- Ollamh Laigin
- Ollamh Osraighe
- Ollamh Desmumu
- Ollamh Thomond
- Ollamh Mumu
- Ollamh Ormond
- Cllamh Ui Maine
- Ollamh Connachta
- Ollamh Síol Muireadaigh
- Ollamh Ui Fiachrach

== Sources ==
- The Encyclopaedia of Ireland 2003; ISBN 0-7171-3000-2.
- Mac Dermot of Moylurg: The Story of a Connacht Family Dermot Mac Dermot, 1996.
- A New History of Ireland VIII: A Chronology of Irish History to 1976 - A Companion to Irish History Part I edited by T.W. Moody, F.X. Martin and F.J. Byrne, 1982. ISBN 0-19-821744-7
- The Celebrated Antiquary Nollaig O Muralie, Maynooth, 1996.
- Irish Leaders and Learning Through the Ages Fr. Paul Walsh, 2004. (ed. Nollaig O Muralie).
