= Tanaide Ó Maolconaire =

Tanaide Ó Maolconaire was the Ollamh Síol Muireadaigh for an unknown number of years prior to his death in 1385.

Tanaide Mor mac Dúinnín Ó Maolconaire, who died in 1310, was the only such Ollamh recorded in the annals for the 14th century prior to this. There must have been at least one (indeed many) Ollamh Síol Muireadaigh during the intervening years, yet none are recorded. It is possible that disruption due to the likes of the Bruce Wars and two plagues in the middle of the century - along with ongoing warfare by and among the Síol Muireadaigh - contributed to this.

Neither is the relationship between Tanaide and the previous Ollamh made clear, beyond the fact that he was a member of the general clan Ó Maolconaire.

Upon his death, the Annals of Connacht refer to Tanaide as "Ollam of the Síl Muireadaigh in history and poetry and the most skilled man of his profession in his time, [he] died at Lammas in his own house, after a victory of Unction and Penance, and was buried in Clooncorpey." He was survived by at least one son, Grígor mac Tanaide Ó Maolconaire.

== Sources ==
- The Encyclopaedia of Ireland 2003; ISBN 0-7171-3000-2.
- Mac Dermot of Moylurg: The Story of a Connacht Family Dermot Mac Dermot, 1996.
- A New History of Ireland VIII: A Chronology of Irish History to 1976 - A Companion to Irish History Part I edited by T.W. Moody, F.X. Martin and F.J. Byrne, 1982. ISBN 0-19-821744-7
- The Celebrated Antiquary Nollaig O Muralie, Maynooth, 1996.
- Irish Leaders and Learning Through the Ages Fr. Paul Walsh, 2004. (ed. Nollaig O Muralie).

Preceded by Tanaide Mor mac Dúinnín Ó Maolconaire	Ollamh Síol Muireadaigh; 13??-1385	Succeeded by Donnchad Baccach Ó Maolconaire
