= Royal Irish Academy, MS 23 N 10 =

Gaelic-Irish medieval manuscript

Dublin, Royal Irish Academy, MS 23 N 10, formerly Betham 145, is a Gaelic–Irish medieval manuscript.

== Overview ==
MS 23 N 10 is a late sixteenth-century Irish manuscript currently housed in the Library of the Royal Irish Academy, Dublin. It was formerly in the possession of Sir William Betham (1779–1853).

The manuscript is highly valuable for its compilation of medieval Irish literature, copied in 1575 at Ballycumin, County Roscommon. The responsible scribes were Aodh, Dubhthach, and Torna, three scholars of the Ó Maolconaire (anglicised: O'Mulconry), a learned family also known for compiling Egerton 1782 (British Library) in 1517.

== See also ==
- Ó Maolconaire
- Ollamh Síl Muireadaigh
- Ó Duibhgeannáin
