= 1451 in Ireland =

- Centuries: 13th; 14th; 15th; 16th; 17th
- Decades: 1430s; 1440s; 1450s; 1460s; 1470s
- See also: Other events of 1451; List of years in Ireland

Events from the year 1451 in Ireland.

== Incumbent ==
- Lord: Henry VI

== Events ==
- Rathmacknee Castle believed to have been built by John Rosseter (Rossiter, Rositer, Rosceter), seneschal of the Liberty of Wexford.

== Deaths ==
- Murcadh Ó Madadhan, Chief of Síol Anmchadha.
- Margaret O'Connor, better known by her maiden name Margaret O'Carroll.
