= Flann Óc mac Séoan Ó Domhnalláin =

Irish poet and historian

Flann Óc mac Séoan Ó Domhnalláin was Ollamh Síol Muireadaigh for an unknown time in 1404.

The annals record an unusual number of bardic deaths in 1404. Donnchad Baccach Ó Maolconaire died, leaving the office of Irish: Ollamh vacant. His death was followed by Gilla Duivin Mac Curtin, Ollamh of Thomond in music, Carroll O'Daly, Ollav of Corcomroe; Donnell, the son of Donough O'Daly, who was usually called Irish: Bolg-an-Dana ... William O'Doran, Ollav of Leinster in judicature ... Teige, the son of boethius Mac Egan, intended ollav of Lower Connacht in law.

Flann Óc became Ollamh, but was dead himself before the year was out. His place was due to be taken by Tuathal, the son of Melaghlin O'Donnellan, intended ollav of Sil-Murray in poetry but Tuathal himself died before gaining the office.

The eventual successor was Dauid mac Tanaide Ó Maolconaire, who held the office until 1419. Flann Óc seems to be the only member of the clan Ó Domhnalláin who held the office.

== Sources ==
- The Encyclopaedia of Ireland 2003; ISBN 0-7171-3000-2.
- Mac Dermot of Moylurg: The Story of a Connacht Family Dermot Mac Dermot, 1996.
- A New History of Ireland VIII: A Chronology of Irish History to 1976 - A Companion to Irish History Part I edited by T.W. Moody, F.X. Martin and F.J. Byrne, 1982. ISBN 0-19-821744-7
- The Celebrated Antiquary Nollaig O Muralie, Maynooth, 1996.
- Irish Leaders and Learning Through the Ages Fr. Paul Walsh, 2004. (ed. Nollaig O Muralie).

Preceded by Donnchad Baccach Ó Maolconaire	Ollamh Síol Muireadaigh; 1404 - 1404	Succeeded by Dauid mac Tanaide Ó Maolconaire,
