= 1453 in Ireland =

- Centuries: 13th; 14th; 15th; 16th; 17th
- Decades: 1430s; 1440s; 1450s; 1460s; 1470s
- See also: Other events of 1453; List of years in Ireland

Events from the year 1453 in Ireland.

== Incumbent ==
- Lord: Henry VI

== Events ==
- Irish clans of O'Neill, Magennis and McCartan lost a battle to English forces at Ardglass.
