= 1454 in Ireland =

- Centuries: 13th; 14th; 15th; 16th; 17th
- Decades: 1430s; 1440s; 1450s; 1460s; 1470s
- See also: Other events of 1454; List of years in Ireland

Events from the year 1454 in Ireland.

== Incumbent ==
- Lord: Henry VI

== Births ==
- Thomas FitzGerald, 11th Earl of Desmond
