= 1452 in Ireland =

- Centuries: 13th; 14th; 15th; 16th; 17th
- Decades: 1430s; 1440s; 1450s; 1460s; 1470s
- See also: Other events of 1452; List of years in Ireland

Events from the year 1452 in Ireland.

== Incumbent ==
- Lord: Henry VI

== Deaths ==
- James Butler, 4th Earl of Ormonde (b. 1392)
