= Urard Ó Maolconaire =

Urard Ó Maolconaire, Ollamh Síol Muireadaigh, died 1482.

The Annals of Connacht, sub anno 1482, say of him:

1482:Urard O Mailchonaire, ollav of Sil Murray in learning and poetry, the chief chronicler of the western world, specially learned in the phases of the moon, translator of a part of the Scriptures from Latin into Irish, died at an advanced age. Sigraid O Mailchonaire succeeded him.

== Sources ==
- Annals of Connacht, A. Martin Freeman, Dublin, 1946.

Preceded by Torna Ó Maolconaire	Ollamh Síol Muireadaigh; 1468-1482	Succeeded by Sigraid Ó Maolconaire
