= Imbas forosnai =

Visionary ability practised by the poets of ancient Ireland

Imbas forosnai, is a gift of clairvoyance or visionary ability practised by the gifted poets of ancient Ireland.

In Old Irish, Imbas imeans "inspiration," and specifically refers to the sacred poetic inspiration believed to be possessed by the fili (Old Irish: inspired, visionary poets) in Early Ireland. Forosnai means "illuminated" or "that which illuminates". Descriptions of the practices associated with Imbas forosnai are found in Cormac's Glossary and in the mythology associated with the hero Fionn mac Cumhaill. In the Táin Bó Cúailgne, the woman poet Fedelm uses her imbas forosnai to predict the outcome of a battle. Imbas forosnai involved the practitioner engaging in sensory deprivation techniques in order to enter a trance and receive answers or prophecy.

In the Celtic traditions, poetry has always served as a primary conveyance of spiritual truth. Celtic texts differentiate between normal poetry, which is only a matter of learned skill, and "inspired" poetry, which is seen as a gift from the gods.

Some Celtic reconstructionists are involved in the revival of the practices connected with Imbas forosnai.
