= Máeleoin Bódur Ó Maolconaire =

13th century Irish poet

Máeleoin Bódur Ó Maolconaire was a member of the Ó Maolconaire family of Connacht, who served as historians and poets to the Síol Muireadaigh, and their rulers, the Ó Conchubhair Kings of Connacht. He is the second of the family listed as the Ollamh Síol Muireadaigh, and died in 1266.

== Sources ==
- The Encyclopaedia of Ireland 2003; ISBN 0-7171-3000-2.
- Mac Dermot of Moylurg: The Story of a Connacht Family Dermot Mac Dermot, 1996.
- A New History of Ireland VIII: A Chronology of Irish History to 1976 - A Companion to Irish History Part I edited by T.W. Moody, F.X. Martin and F.J. Byrne, 1982. ISBN 0-19-821744-7
- The Celebrated Antiquary Nollaig O Muralie, Maynooth, 1996.
- Irish Leaders and Learning Through the Ages Fr. Paul Walsh, 2004. (ed. Nollaig O Muralie).

Preceded by Dúinnín Ó Maolconaire	Ollamh Síol Muireadaigh; 1231–1266	Succeeded by Dubsúilech Ó Maolconaire
