= Sadhbh Béan Ó Mailchonaire =

Sadhbh Uí Mhailchonaire, Ban Ollamh Síol Muireadaigh, 1441-1447 was an Irish poet.

The Annals of Connacht, sub anno 1447, record her death as follows:Sadb daughter of Uilliam Mac Branain, wife of Mailin O Mailchonaire, died after a victory over the world and the Devil. However, a more fulsome account appears in Mac Fhirbhisigh's annals, where she is called Banollamh of Silmiredhy fitz ffeargus and a nurse to all guests and strangers and of all the learned men in Ireland.

Her husband, the poet and historian Mailin mac Tanaide Ó Maolconaire died in 1441, after which Sadhbh apparently replaced him as poet, hence the term banollamh (woman-poet).

== Sources ==
- Annals of Connacht, A. Martin Freeman, Dublin, 1946.
- Annals of Ireland from the year 1443 ... translated by ... Dudley mac Firbisse, ed. John O'Donovan, in The Miscellany of the Irish Archaeological Society, vol. i, pp. 198–302, Dublin, 1846.

Preceded by Mailin mac Tanaide Ó Maolconaire	Ollamh Síol Muireadaigh; 1441 - 1447	Succeeded by Torna Ó Maolconaire
