= 1455 in Ireland =

- Centuries: 13th; 14th; 15th; 16th; 17th
- Decades: 1430s; 1440s; 1450s; 1460s; 1470s
- See also: Other events of 1455; List of years in Ireland

Events from the year 1455 in Ireland.

== Incumbent ==
- Lord: Henry VI

== Births ==
- Thaddeus McCarthy, Bishop of Ross (Ireland), then Bishop of Cork and Cloyne (d. 1492)
