= Sigraid Ó Maolconaire =

Sigraid Ó Maolconaire was the Ollamh Síol Muireadaigh, died 1487.

The Annals of Connacht, sub anno 1487, state:

- O Mailchonaire, that is Sigraid son of Sean Ruad, died.

The later compilation known as the Annals of the Four Masters provide more detail:

- Seery O'Mulconry, Ollav of Sil-Murray, head of the cheerfulness and jocularity of the men of Ireland, died; and two Kenfinès of the tribe were set up in his place, namely, Donnell and Mulconry, the son of Torna.

== Sources ==
- The Encyclopaedia of Ireland 2003; ISBN 0-7171-3000-2.
- Mac Dermot of Moylurg: The Story of a Connacht Family Dermot Mac Dermot, 1996.
- A New History of Ireland VIII: A Chronology of Irish History to 1976 - A Companion to Irish History Part I edited by T.W. Moody, F.X. Martin and F. J. Byrne, 1982. ISBN 0-19-821744-7
- The Celebrated Antiquary Nollaig O Muralie, Maynooth, 1996.
- Irish Leaders and Learning Through the Ages Fr. Paul Walsh, 2004. (ed. Nollaig O Muralie).

Preceded by Urard Ó Maolconaire	Ollamh Síol Muireadaigh; 1482–1487	Succeeded by Domnall Ó Maolconaire; Mailin mac Torna Ó Maolconaire
