= Torna Ó Maolconaire =

Torna Ó Maolconaire was Ollamh Síol Muireadaigh from 1447-1468.

The Annals of Connacht, sub anno 1468, say of him:

Torna O Mailchonaire, ollav of Sil Murray in History and Poetry, died after a victory of repentance in his own house at Lis Ferbain after St. Patrick's day; he was buried under the protection of Patrick and St. Francis at Elphin and Urard O Mailchonaire succeeded to the ollavship.

== Sources ==
- Annals of Connacht, A. Martin Freeman, Dublin, 1946.
- Annals of Ireland from the year 1443 to 1468 ... translated by ... Dudley mac Firbisse, ed. John O'Donovan, in The Miscellany of the Irish Archaeological Society, vol. i, pp. 198–302, Dublin, 1846.

Preceded by Sadhbh Béan Ó Mailchonaire	Ollamh Síol Muireadaigh; 1447-1468	Succeeded by Urard Ó Maolconaire
