= Mailin mac Tanaide Ó Maolconaire =

Mailin mac Tanaide Ó Maolconaire, Ollamh Síol Muireadaigh, c. 1360–1441.

The Annals of Connacht, sub anno 1441, say of him:

Mailin son of Tanaide O Mailchonaire, ollav of the Sil Murray, principal author of the learning of Ireland and Scotland and head of his family for thirty-seven years, went the way of all flesh at the age of eighty or more, and may his soul find forgiveness for ever and ever. Amen. He was buried with (?) the saints of the town on the fifteenth of February by the day of the month, Wednesday by the day of the week.

In an apparently unusual move, he was succeeded by his wife, Sadhbh Béan Ó Mailchonaire.

== Sources ==
- Annals of Connacht, A. Martin Freeman, Dublin, 1946.
- Annals of Ireland from the year 1443 to 1468 ... translated by ... Dudley mac Firbisse, ed. John O'Donovan, in The Miscellany of the Irish Archaeological Society, vol. i, pp. 198–302, Dublin, 1846.

| Preceded by Dauid mac Tanaide Ó Maolconaire | Ollamh Síol Muireadaigh; 1418-1441 | Succeeded by Sadhbh Béan Ó Mailchonaire |
