= Dauid mac Tanaide Ó Maolconaire =

Dauid mac Tanaide Ó Maolconaire, Ollamh Síol Muireadaigh, died 1419.

The Annals of Connacht state:

1419. Dauid son of Tanaide O Mailchonaire ollav of the Sil Muiredaig, died of the plague in his own house at Kilmore, after Unction and Penance, and was buried in the monastery of John Baptist at Trim, with much honour and state, in the autumn.

== Sources ==
- The Encyclopaedia of Ireland 2003; ISBN 0-7171-3000-2.
- Mac Dermot of Moylurg: The Story of a Connacht Family Dermot Mac Dermot, 1996.
- A New History of Ireland VIII: A Chronology of Irish History to 1976 - A Companion to Irish History Part I edited by T.W. Moody, F.X. Martin and F.J. Byrne, 1982. ISBN 0-19-821744-7
- The Celebrated Antiquary Nollaig O Muralie, Maynooth, 1996.
- Irish Leaders and Learning Through the Ages Fr. Paul Walsh, 2004. (ed. Nollaig O Muralie).

Preceded by Flann Óc mac Séoan Ó Domhnalláin	Ollamh Síol Muireadaigh; 1404?-1419	Succeeded by Cormac Ó Domhnalláin,
