= Ollamh Síol Muireadaigh =

Ollamh Síol Muireadaigh was a hereditary post, held almost exclusively by members of the Ó Maolconaire family, from at least the 13th century until the 17th century. The Síol Muireadaigh were a dynasty of regional clans, named after King Muiredach Muillethan of Connacht (died 702), all of whom lived in north-central Connacht. While many of the ruling chieftains such as the Ó Conchubhair Donn, Ó Conchubhair Ruadh, Mac Diarmata, and Ó Flannagain were descendants of this Muiredach Muillethan, the Ó Maolconaires are of Laiginian, or mythically of Tuatha Dé Dannan stock, although their Milesian pedigrees claim differently. The Laiginians arrived in Connacht in the 3rd century AD from Leinster, conquering the ruling Fir Bolg and Fomorians, and ruling until conquered by the Gael under the Connachta in the 5th century.

An ollamh was the highest rank in the learned orders of law, poetry, or history. These educated professionals, today grouped together in the popular consciousness as "bards", maintained an oral tradition that pre-dated Christianization of Ireland.

The post had likely existed for at least as long as the Síl Muireadaigh dynasty themselves, but earlier ollamhs are unknown. The first of the family so listed was Dúinnín Ó Maolconaire.

== List of Ollamhs ==
- Dúinnín Ó Maolconaire, died 1213
- Máeleoin Bódur Ó Maolconaire, died 1266
- Dubsúilech Ó Maolconaire
- Tanaide Mor mac Dúinnín Ó Maolconaire, 1270–1310
- Mael Sechlainn Ó Domhnalláin, Ollav of Sil-Murray in particular in poetry, and the most learned man in all Ireland in the same art, died of Fiolun in 1375.
- Tanaide Ó Maolconaire, died 1385
- Donnchad Baccach Ó Maolconaire, died 1404
- Flann Óc mac Séoan Ó Domhnalláin, died 1404
- Dauid mac Tanaide Ó Maolconaire, died 1419
- Cormac Ó Domhnalláin, died 1436
- Mailin mac Tanaide Ó Maolconaire, died 1441.
- Sadhbh Ó Mailchonaire, died 1447.
- Torna Ó Maolconaire, died 1468
- Urard Ó Maolconaire, died 1482
- Sigraid Ó Maolconaire, died 1487
- Mailin mac Torna Ó Maolconaire, died 1519
- Torna mac Torna Ó Maolconaire, died 1532
- Conchobar mac Domnall Ruad Ó Maolconaire 1532 - 15??
- Muirges mac Paidin Ó Maolconaire?, d.1543
- Lochlainn mac Paidin Ó Maolconaire, died 1551

== See also ==
- Ollamh Érenn
- Ollamh Tuisceairt
- Ollamh Airgialla
- Ollamh Ulaidh
- Ollamh Laigin
- Ollamh Osraighe
- Ollamh Desmumu
- Ollamh Thomond
- Ollamh Mumu
- Ollamh Ormond
- Cllamh Ui Maine
- Ollamh Connachta - 1416:Tomas Mac ind Oclaig, erenagh of Killery and chief master of Law in Connacht, died after a victory of repentance.
- Ollamh Clanricarde - 1438.3:Conchobar Mac Aedacain, ollav of Macwilliam of Clanrickard, died.
- Ollamh Ui Fiachrach - 1414: Donnchad Mac Fir Bisig, prospective ollav of the Uí Fiachrach Muaide, died this year.

== Sources ==
- The Encyclopaedia of Ireland 2003; ISBN 0-7171-3000-2.
- Mac Dermot of Moylurg: The Story of a Connacht Family Dermot Mac Dermot, 1996.
- A New History of Ireland VIII: A Chronology of Irish History to 1976 - A Companion to Irish History Part I edited by T.W. Moody, F.X. Martin and F.J. Byrne, 1982. ISBN 0-19-821744-7
- The Celebrated Antiquary Nollaig O Muralie, Maynooth, 1996.
- Irish Leaders and Learning Through the Ages Fr. Paul Walsh, 2004. (ed. Nollaig O Muralie).
