= 1440 =

1440 in various calendars
- Gregorian calendar: 1440; MCDXL
- Ab urbe condita: 2193
- Armenian calendar: 889; ԹՎ ՊՁԹ
- Assyrian calendar: 6190
- Balinese saka calendar: 1361–1362
- Bengali calendar: 846–847
- Berber calendar: 2390
- English Regnal year: 18 Hen. 6 – 19 Hen. 6
- Buddhist calendar: 1984
- Burmese calendar: 802
- Byzantine calendar: 6948–6949
- Chinese calendar: 己未年 (Earth Goat); 4137 or 3930 — to — 庚申年 (Metal Monkey); 4138 or 3931
- Coptic calendar: 1156–1157
- Discordian calendar: 2606
- Ethiopian calendar: 1432–1433
- Hebrew calendar: 5200–5201
- Hindu calendars
- Vikram Samvat: 1496–1497
- Shaka Samvat: 1361–1362
- Kali Yuga: 4540–4541
- Holocene calendar: 11440
- Igbo calendar: 440–441
- Iranian calendar: 818–819
- Islamic calendar: 843–844
- Japanese calendar: Eikyō 12 (永享１２年)
- Javanese calendar: 1355–1356
- Julian calendar: 1440; MCDXL
- Korean calendar: 3773
- Minguo calendar: 472 before ROC 民前472年
- Nanakshahi calendar: −28
- Thai solar calendar: 1982–1983
- Tibetan calendar: ས་མོ་ལུག་ལོ་ (female Earth-Sheep); 1566 or 1185 or 413 — to — ལྕགས་ཕོ་སྤྲེ་ལོ་ (male Iron-Monkey); 1567 or 1186 or 414

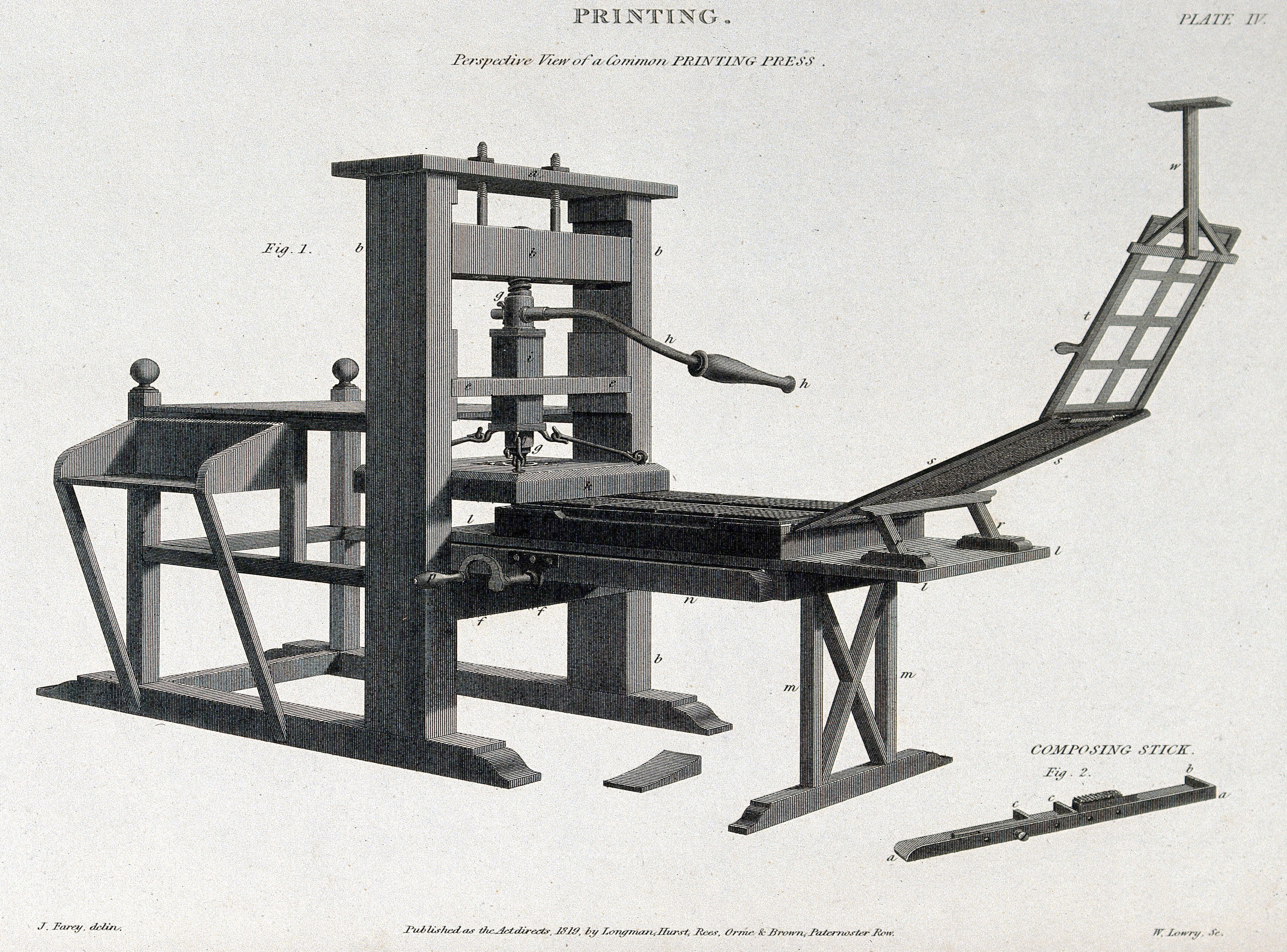
The Printing press is invented around 1440 by Johannes Gutenberg, rapidly changing Europe.

1440 (MCDXL) was a leap year starting on Friday of the Julian calendar, the 1440th year of the Common Era (CE) and Anno Domini (AD) designations, the 440th year of the 2nd millennium, the 40th year of the 15th century, and the 1st year of the 1440s decade. As of the start of 1440, the Gregorian calendar was 9 days ahead of the Julian calendar, which was the dominant calendar of the time.

== Events ==
=== January–March ===
- January 6 – Ludovico becomes the new Duke of Savoy upon the abdication of his father Amadeus VIII.
- January 8 – Seventeen new Roman Catholic Cardinals are added to the College of Cardinals afer having been appointed by Pope Eugene IV on December 18.
- February 21 – The Prussian Confederation is proposed as an opposition to the Teutonic Knights at a meeting in Elbing by nobles from the cities of Culm, Elbing, Thorn, Danzig, Braunsberg, Königsberg, and Kneiphof. The delegates agree to hold a larger meeting on March 14 at Marienwerder.
- February 22 – Four months after the death of King Albert of Hungary, his son, Ladislaus the Posthumous, is born at Komárom (modern-day Komárno in Slovakia) to Albert's widow, Elisabeth, regent for the vacant throne. Elizabeth argues to the Hungarian nobles that Ladislaus should be elected as the rightful successor to King Albert, and that she should serve as the boy's regent.
- February 26 – Ibrahim II becomes the Bey of Candar, a monarchy on the Black Sea that encompasses 10 modern-day Turkish provinces, upon the death of his father, Mubariz al-Din Isfendiyar, in the capital, Sinop.
- February–June – The Praguerie, an uprising by the French nobility against King Charles VII.
- March 8 – Despite the birth of a posthumous son of the late King Albert V, the Hungarian nobles vote to elect King Vladislaus III of Poland as the new King of Hungary.
- March 14 – The Prussian Confederation is formed by 53 nobles and clergy, representing 19 Prussian cities, who meet at Elbing to form an opposition to the Teutonic Knights.
- March 20 – Sigismund Kęstutaitis, the Grand Duke of Lithuania, is assassinated at his residence at the Trakai Peninsula Castle by supporters of his rival, Svitraglia.

=== April–June ===
- April 9 – Christopher of Bavaria is elected King of Denmark.
- April – Ottoman Sultan Murad II begins the siege of Belgrade, at this time part of the Kingdom of Hungary following the conquest of Serbia. The fortress is heavily damaged, but the defenders' use of artillery prevents the Turks from capturing the city, and the siege ends after six months.
- May 4 – Metrophanes II, Bishop of Cyzicus, is appointed by the Byzantine Emperor John VIII Palaiologos as the new Ecumenical Patriarch of Constantinople, leader of the Eastern Orthodox Church, to succeed Joseph II, who had died in 1439.
- May 15 – Elizabeth of Luxembourg, regent for the vacant throne of Hungary, has her infant son, Ladislaus the Posthumous, crowned king at Székesfehérvár with the stolen Crown of Saint Stephen.
- June 29
  - The League of Italian States (Florence, Venice and the Papal States) defeats the army of the Duchy of Milan at the Battle of Anghiari in Tuscany.
  - Casimir IV Jagiellon is proclaimed as the new Grand Duke of Lithuania by the Lithuanian Council of Lords.
  - The Diet of Hungary approves a resolution declaring the coronation of Ladislaus as King of Hungary to be invalid, declaring that "the crowning of kings is always dependent on the will of the kingdom's inhabitants, in whose consent both the effectiveness and the force of the crown reside".

=== July–September ===
- July 11 – John V, Duke of Brittany, signs a neutrality agreement with the Kingdom of England, promising not to give shelter to England's enemies in the ongoing English occupation of western France.
- July 17 – Wladyslaw III, King of Poland and Supreme Duke of Lithuania, is crowned as King László I of Hungary at the Basilica of the Assumption of the Blessed Virgin Mary in Székesfehérvár.
- July 24 – At Basel in Switzerland, Amadeus VIII, Duke of Savoy is crowned as "Pope Felix V" by Roman Catholic cardinals of the Council of Basel who had voted to depose Pope Eugene IV as leader of the Roman Catholic Church. As Felix V, he is designated in Vatican history as the last "antipope". He remains in Basel and never travels to Rome to assume the papacy; in 1449, after the death of Eugene IV, Amadeus assumes an oath of loyalty to Eugene's successor, Pope Nicholas V.
- August 31 – In France, the Siege of Tartas is commenced in Gascony by troops of the Kingdom of England and the English-controlled Duchy of Gascony in an attempt to oust a French supporter of King Charles VII, Charles II d'Albret, who has taken control of Tartas. The siege lasts for almost two years before being abandoned by the English.
- September 10 – A rebellion in Hungary, instigated by Ladislaus Garai against the newly elected King Laszlo (who is also king of Poland), is ended when Garai's army is annihilated in a battle at Bátaszék by the troops of General János Hunyadi and of Nicholas of Ilok, ruler of Croatia.
- September 12 – Eton College, one of the most famous boarding schools for boys in England, is founded by King Henry VI as "Kynge's College of Our Ladye of Eton besyde Windesore".
- September 13
  - Christopher of Bavaria, King Christopher III of Denmark, is formally enthroned as King Kristofer I of Sweden, bringing an end to the regency of Karl Knutsson Bonde.
  - Breton lord Gilles de Rais is arrested at his castle at Machecoul after an accusation of murdering children is brought against him by the Bishop of Nantes.
- September 21 – The Burgraviate of Nuremberg, a member nation-state of the Holy Roman Empire, comes to an end after more than three centuries when the two sons of the last Burgrave, Frederick V, divide the territory into two separate principalities. Frederick VI (who is also Elector of Brandenburg) becomes the ruler of the Principality of Ansbach, while John III becomes the ruler of the Principality of Bayreuth

=== October–December ===
- October 22 – Gilles de Rais confesses and is sentenced to death on a conviction of murdering at least 140 children. He is hanged on October 26 and his corpse is then burned at the stake.
- November 2 – The Old Zurich War begins as the Canton of Zurich, led by the burgomaster Rudolf Stüssi, is expelled from the Swiss Confederation (Corpus helveticum) by the leaders of the other cantons (Bern, Glarus, Lucerne, Schwyz, Unterwalden, Uri and Zug). Stüssi makes an alliance with Frederick III, Holy Roman Emperor and a war which will last more than five years begins.
- November 3 – Charles, Duke of Orléans, is released from incarceration in England, 25 years after he had been taken as a prisoner of war at the Battle of Agincourt in 1415. His freedom is gained after negotiations made by two of his former enemies, the Duke of Burgundy and the Queen of Portugal, and payment of a ransom of 80,000 gold coins. The Duke of Orleans, now aged 46, returns to French soil after more than a quarter of a century in England.
- November 24 – The "Black Dinner" takes place at Edinburgh Castle as Lord Chancellor of Scotland William Crichton conspires with the James Douglas, uncle of the late Archibald Douglas (who had served as regent for King James II) to invite Archibald's two sons, 16-year old William Douglas, 6th Earl of Douglas and David Douglas to dinner with King James. At the dinner, the two boys are taken hostage and murdered, the members of Clan Douglas besiege the castle, and James Douglas inherits the Earldom.
- December 1 – Representatives of the Swiss canton of Zurich sign the Peace of Lucerne, bringing a temporary halt to the Old Zurich War.

=== Date unknown ===
- Itzcóatl, Aztec ruler of Tenochtitlan, dies and is succeeded by Moctezuma I (Moctezuma Ilhuicamina).
- Lorenzo Valla's De falso credita et ementita Constantini Donatione declamatio demonstrates that the Donation of Constantine is a forgery.
- Sir Richard Molyneux is appointed constable of Liverpool Castle, in England.
- The Ming dynasty government of China begins a decade-long series of issuing harsh edicts towards those who illegally mine silver, the latter known as 'miner bandits' (kuangzei), a trend begun in 1438. The government wants to cap the amount of silver circulating into the market, as more grain taxes are converted into silver taxes. The government establishes community night watches known as 'watches and tithings' (baojia), who ensure that illegal mining activities are brought to a halt. However, these are desperate measures, as illegal silver mining continues to thrive as a dangerous but lucrative venture.
- Uwaifiokun, Oba of Benin, is killed by his brother, the Prince Ogun, who succeeds him as Ewuare I.
- Zhu Quan writes the Cha Pu ("Tea Manual") in China.

== Births ==
- January 22: Ivan III of Russia (d. 1505)
- February 13: Hartmann Schedel, German physician (d. 1514)
- date unknown: Clara Tott, German court singer (d. 1520)

== Deaths ==
- March 9: Frances of Rome, Italian Benedictine nun and saint (b. 1384)
- March 20: Sigismund Kęstutaitis, Grand Duke of Lithuania (b. 1365)
- April 2: Giovanni Vitelleschi, Italian Roman Catholic bishop and soldier
- April 6: Henry Wardlaw, Scottish church leader
- September 20: Frederick I, Elector of Brandenburg (b. 1371)
- September 30: Reginald Grey, 3rd Baron Grey de Ruthyn, English soldier and politician
- October 12: Ginevra d'Este (b. 1419)
- October 26: Gilles de Rais, French lord (b. c. 1405)
- November 13: Joan Beaufort, Countess of Westmoreland
- date unknown:
  - Itzcóatl, Aztec Tlatoani (ruler) of Tenochtitlan
  - Uwaifiokun, Oba of Benin
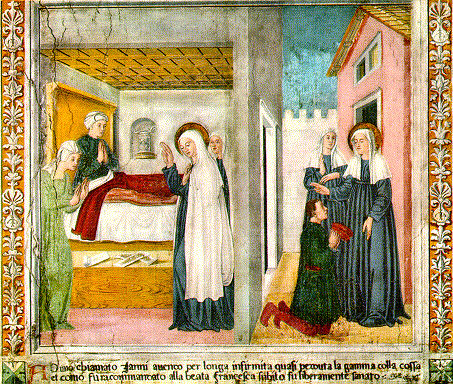
Saint Frances of Rome

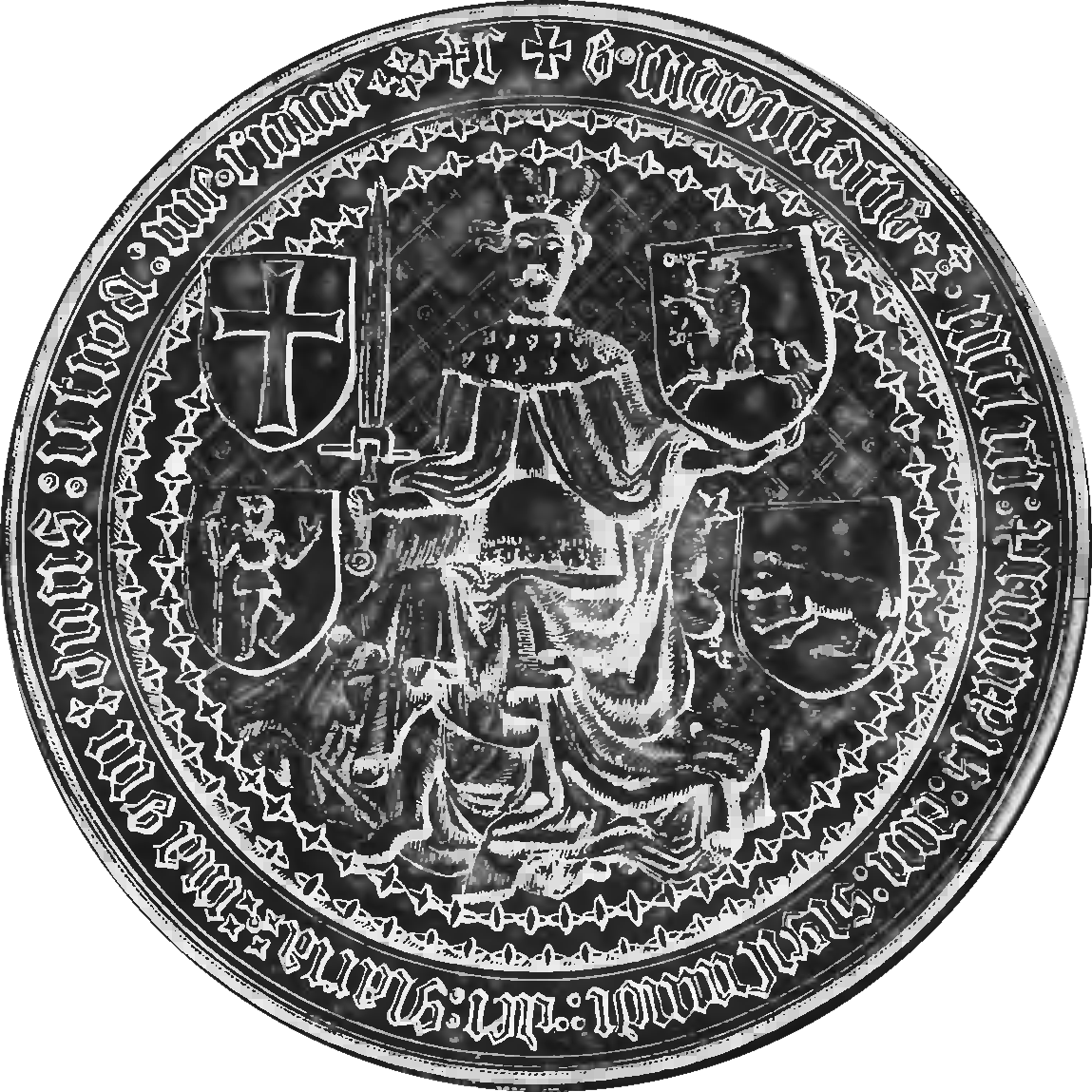
Sigismund Kęstutaitis

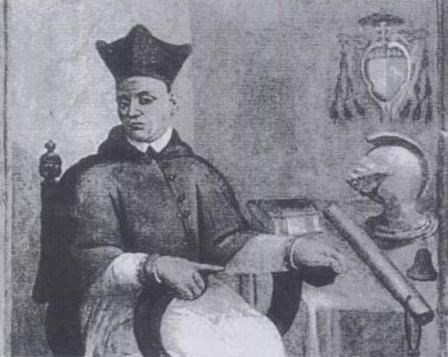
Giovanni Vitelleschi
