= Ollam =

Professional rank in Gaelic Irish society

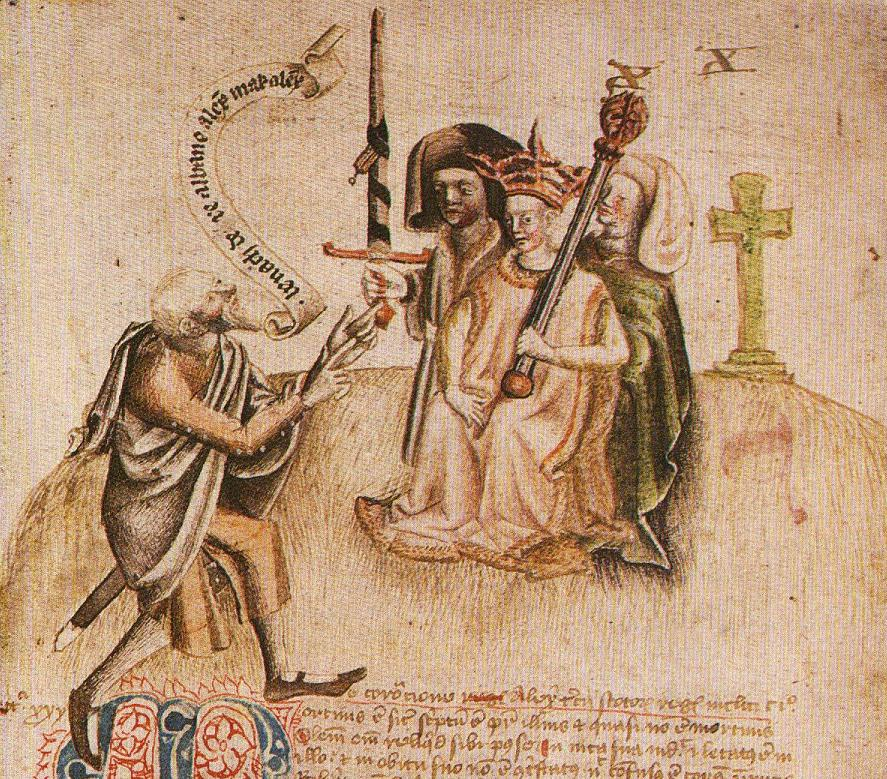
Coronation of Alexander III as King of Scots, 1249. He is being greeted by the Ollam rígh Alban, the royal ollam of Scotland, who is addressing him with the proclamation Benach De Re Albanne ("God Bless the King of Scots").

An ollam or ollamh (Old Irish: [ˈol̪aβ̃]; anglicised as ollave or ollav), plural ollomain, in early Irish literature, was a master in a particular trade or skill.

== Bard ==
Generally, ollam referred to a professional poet or bard of literature and history, and a member of the highest of the seven ranks of filí, achieved after at least twelve years of study.

As part of a king's court, the ollam might combine the functions of poet, story-teller, and historian, including an accurate recitation of genealogies. The calling to the vocation was usually a family tradition.

As early as 574, members of the Ó hUiginn (O'Higgins) clan were recorded as hereditary poets in the courts of Irish Princes and Chiefs. As such they were accorded a status of nobility second in rank only to the King and were entitled to wear the same number of colours in their robes.

== Other uses ==
The term was also used to refer to the highest member of any group; thus an ollam brithem would be the highest rank of judge, and an ollam rí the highest rank of king. Ollav was also applied to a druidic rank; meaning much the same as "professor", or person of great learning.

There was an official post in ancient Ireland called the "Rí Ollam" or "Ard Ollam" or Chief Ollam of Ireland. The holder of the post had a standing equal to the High King of Ireland.

Ollamh Fodhla was the title of the mythical 18th High King of Ireland who is said to have first formed the assembly known as the Feis Teamhrach, or Feast of Tara around 1300 BCE.

== Literary fosterage ==
In Ancient Ireland, ollams taught children with or without compensation depending on the circumstance.

== See also ==
- Ollamh Érenn
- Senchán Torpéist
- Dallán Forgaill
