= 1445 =

1445 in various calendars
- Gregorian calendar: 1445; MCDXLV
- Ab urbe condita: 2198
- Armenian calendar: 894; ԹՎ ՊՂԴ
- Assyrian calendar: 6195
- Balinese saka calendar: 1366–1367
- Bengali calendar: 851–852
- Berber calendar: 2395
- English Regnal year: 23 Hen. 6 – 24 Hen. 6
- Buddhist calendar: 1989
- Burmese calendar: 807
- Byzantine calendar: 6953–6954
- Chinese calendar: 甲子年 (Wood Rat); 4142 or 3935 — to — 乙丑年 (Wood Ox); 4143 or 3936
- Coptic calendar: 1161–1162
- Discordian calendar: 2611
- Ethiopian calendar: 1437–1438
- Hebrew calendar: 5205–5206
- Hindu calendars
- Vikram Samvat: 1501–1502
- Shaka Samvat: 1366–1367
- Kali Yuga: 4545–4546
- Holocene calendar: 11445
- Igbo calendar: 445–446
- Iranian calendar: 823–824
- Islamic calendar: 848–849
- Japanese calendar: Bun'an 2 (文安２年)
- Javanese calendar: 1360–1361
- Julian calendar: 1445; MCDXLV
- Korean calendar: 3778
- Minguo calendar: 467 before ROC 民前467年
- Nanakshahi calendar: −23
- Thai solar calendar: 1987–1988
- Tibetan calendar: ཤིང་ཕོ་བྱི་བ་ལོ་ (male Wood-Rat); 1571 or 1190 or 418 — to — ཤིང་མོ་གླང་ལོ་ (female Wood-Ox); 1572 or 1191 or 419

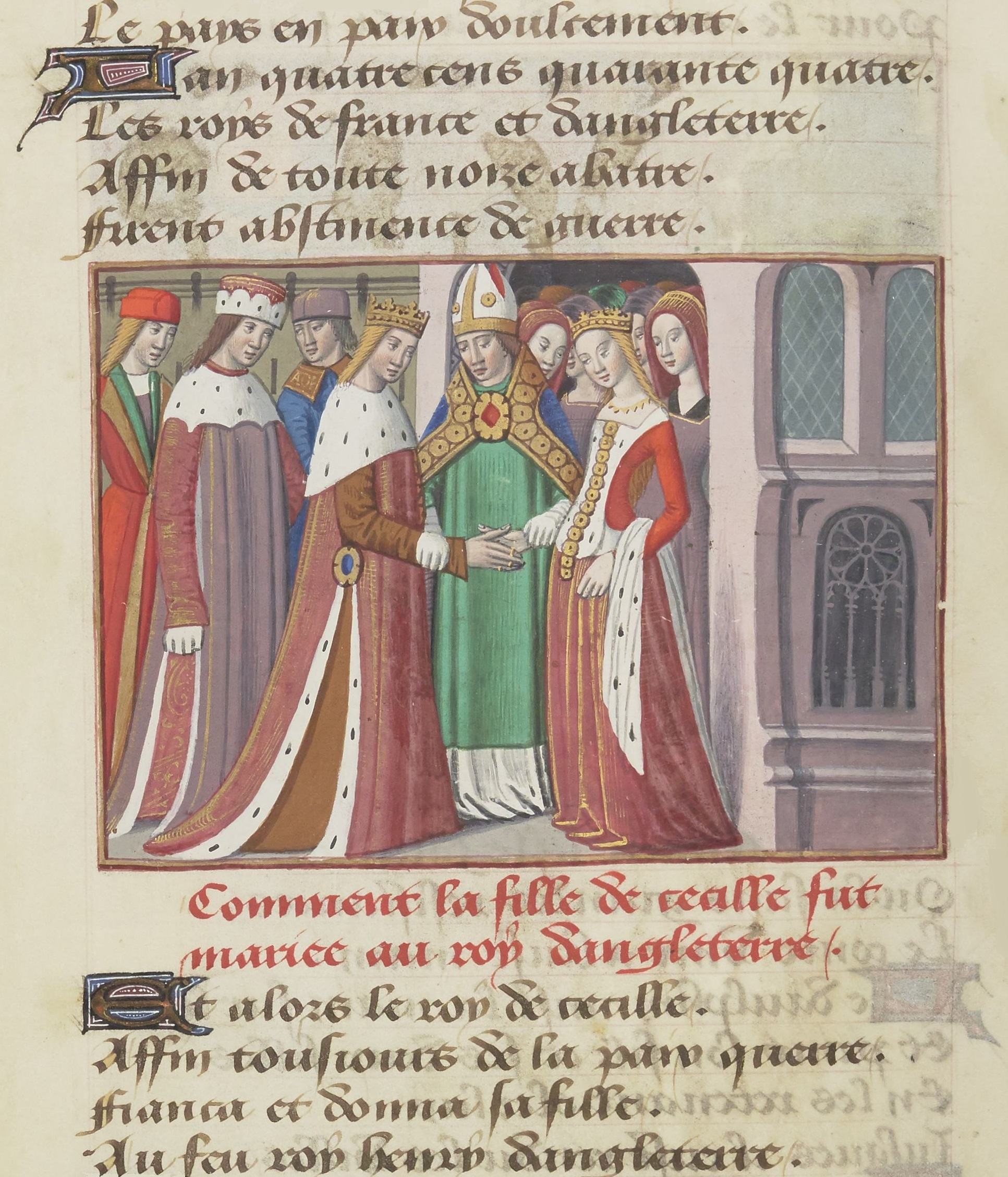
April 23: King Henry VI of England marries Margaret of Anjou.

Year 1445 (MCDXLV) was a common year starting on Friday of the Julian calendar.

== Events ==
=== January–March ===
- January 1 – In northern India, Ala-ud-Din Alam Shah becomes the new Sultan of Delhi upon the death of his father, Muhammad Shah IV.
- January 13 – King Henry VI of England summons the English Parliament for the first time in almost three years, directing the Lords and the members of the House of Commons to assemble at Westminster on February 25.
- January 19 – In Poland, the Duchy of Oświęcim, ruled jointly since 1434 by the three sons of the late Duke Casimir of the Piast dynasty, is divided between the three brothers. Wenceslaus I, the eldest, receives the Duchy of Zator, Przemysław becomes ruler of Toszek and Jan IV, the youngest of the brothers, receives the capital, Oświęcim, along with the towns of Kęty and Żywiec.
- February 25 – The English Parliament is opened by King Henry VI. On the first day, the House of Commons elects William Burley as its Speaker.
- March 8 – The Amir Isfahan of Baghdad (born Ispend bin Yusuf) dies after a reign of 12 years and is succeeded by Fulad Mirza. The ruler of the adjacent Qara Qoyunlu Empire, Jahan Shah, then mobilizes an army at Tabriz to invade and take control of Baghdad.

=== April–June ===
- April 7 – In southern Germany, the number of Duchies of Bavaria is reduced from three to two when Bavaria-Ingolstadt is reunited with Bavaria-Landshut, under the rule of Heinrich the Rich following the death of Ludwig the Hunchback of Ingolstadt. The Duchy of Bavaria-Munich, ruled by Albert III the Pious remains the only other duchy in Bavaria.
- April 8 – At West Java in what is now Indonesia, the Sultanate of Cirebon establishes its capital at Dukuh Alang-alang and Ki Gedeng Alang-Alang is designated as the Sultan.
- April 9 – The 14th Parliament of King Henry VI (23 H. 6) closes and royal assent is given to new laws, including the Labourers Act (requiring that "A servant in husbandry purporting to depart from his master must give him half a year's warning, or else shall serve him the year following.") and the Exportation Act ("Whoever shall pack or ship thrums or threads to pass beyond the seas, during the three years next coming, shall forfeit the same, or the value.")
- April 23 – King Henry VI of England marries Margaret of Anjou, daughter of René of Anjou, the former King of Naples, at a ceremony at Titchfield Abbey in Hampshire.
- May 29 – Stjepan Tomaš Kotromanić of the House of Kotromanić is granted recognition by the Roman Catholic Church and Pope Eugene IV as King Tomaš of Bosnia.
- May 30 – At a ceremony at Westminster Abbey, the coronation of Margaret of Anjou as Queen consort of England takes place before John Stafford, Archbishop of Canterbury.
- June 1 – In Hungary, the deadline passes for King Vladislaus I (who is also King Wladyslaw III of Poland), to return from the Crusade against the Ottoman Empire and to resume rule, and the 5-year-old Ladislaus the Posthumous is recognized as King of Hungary by the legislators of the Országgyűlés. To administer the kingdom of Hungary during the minority of Ladislaus, the Hungarian nobles elect seven "Captains in Chief" – John Hunyadi, Michael Ország, George Rozgonyi, Pongrác Szentmiklósi, Janos Jiskra, Miklos Újlaki and Emeric Bebek – to administer the kingdom Confirmation is made later that King Vladislaus had been killed almost seven months earlier at the November 10 Battle of Varna.
- June 24 – Annibale I Bentivoglio, the ruler of the semi-independent Lordship of Bologna since 1443, is assassinated by the rival Canneschi family, with the support of Pope Eugene IV.

=== July–September ===
- July 7 – The Battle of Suzdal takes place 120 miles (190 km) from Moscow when Ulugh Muhammad of the Khanate of Kazan attacks Nizhny Novgorod, part of the Grand Principality of Moscow. The Grand Prince Vasily II of Moscow is captured in battle as a prisoner of war and held for ransom until the payment of 200,000 rubles is completed in November.
- July 16 – In Germany, Frederick II, Elector of Saxony and his brother William III, Duke of Luxembourg, agree to negotiate the Division of Altenburg, in hopes of peacefully splitting lands in Thuringia which they had inherited from their father's cousin, Frederick IV of Thuringia.
- August 7 – A papal bull is issued by Pope Eugene IV declaring that the Chaldean Christians and the Maronites of Cyprus are in full communion with the Roman Catholic Church.
- August 16 – Margaret Stewart, Dauphine of France, daughter of the late King James I of Scotland and wife of the Dauphin Louis, son of King Charles VII of France, dies from an illness contracted a week earlier. On her deathbed, she accuses a court official, Jamet de Tillay, of having slandered her reputation and causing her death.
- September 5 – In Switzerland, troops from the Canton of Zürich launch a new attack on Brugg in the Canton of Aargau, but their raid is detected before they can reach the city and the Zurich troops are repelled. The troops then pillage surrounding villages.
- September 12 – In a royal wedding at the Church of Our Lady in Copenhagen, King Christoffer III of Denmark (who also rules Sweden and Norway) marries Dorothea of Brandenburg, daughter of John the Alchemist, Margrave of Brandenburg. After King Christoffer's death in 1448, Dorothea marries King Christian I of Denmark in 1449.
- September 14 – Queen consort Dorothea is crowned as "Queen of the Union of the Three Kingdoms" (kronet som unionsdronning af de tre kongeriger) in a ceremony at Copenhagen two days after her marriage to King Christoffer, who levies a series of taxes to pay for the expense.
- September 17 – Đurađ Branković, Despot of Serbia, and his sons Grgur, Stefan and Lazar sign a charter confirming the sovereignty and privileges of the Republic of Ragusa, located in what is now Croatia.
- September 26 – Negotiations between the Saxon brothers Frederick and William on the division of Thuringia break down after Frederick asserts that he will claim western Thuringia and will only allow William to inherit the Margraviate of Meissen.
- September 29 – In Normandy, Richard of York, 3rd Duke of York of England's House of Plantagenet, completes his five-year term as Lieutenant-general of British-occupied France and Edmund Beaufort, 2nd Duke of Somerset takes his place. He returns to England on October 20.

=== October–December ===
- October 6 – A battle is fought at Erlenbach in Switzerland as troops from the canton of Zurich defeat a group of wine thieves. The battle takes place a year after the first battle of Erlenbach that had been waged on October 13, 1444.
- October 10 – At the Battle of Mokra, Albanian forces under the command of the rebel Skanderbeg, with 3,500 soldiers, defeat the more than 9,000 Ottoman troops led by Firuz Pasha. Firuz is killed in battle along with 1,500 of his men. Pope Eugene IV raises a hymn of praise, that Christendom has been provided with a new defender, after he hears of the battle).
- November 3 – (3rd waxing of Nadaw 807 ME) In the city of Bhamo (now in Myanmar), Chinese troops invade and proceed toward Inwa, the fortified capital of the Kingdom of Ava in pursuit of Thonganbwa, the ruler of the independent state of Mogaung, who had led numerous raids into China's Yunnan Province. King Narapati I of Ava, who had captured Thonganbwa in 1442, negotiates an agreement to hand Thonganbwa over to the Chinese in return for assistance in helping Ava conquer rebels in Yamethin. Before he can be turned over to China for execution, Thonganbwa commits suicide, but China accepts his corpse as a recognition of Ava's submission.
- December 11 – At a monastery in Neuwerk in Halle, with the mediation of the Landgrave Louis II of Lower Hesse, the Archbishop Frederick III of Magdeburg, and the Margrave Frederick II of Brandenburg, William III, Duke of Luxembourg and his brother Frederick II, Elector of Saxony, the two surviving sons of Frederick I, Elector of Saxony, make a final attempt to agree on the division of lands in Thuringia which they had inherited from their father's cousin, Frederick IV of Thuringia. Despite the mediation, Frederick of Saxony and William of Luxembourg are not able to agree and the Saxon Fratricidal War begins a few months later.
- December 25 – In northeastern Africa, the Battle of Gomit is fought between the Ethiopian Empire (whose troops are led by the Emperor Zara Yaqob ) and the Adal Sultanate, whose invading army is led by the Sultan Badlay ibn Sa'ad ad-Din. The Sultan charges toward the Emperor, who kills him with his spear. The Adal troops flee and many are killed by the pursuing Ethiopian troops. Badlay's son, Muhammad ibn Badlay, survives and becomes the new Sultan.

=== Date unknown ===
- The Portuguese set up their first trading post (Feitoria) in Africa, on the island of Arguin.
- Portuguese explorer Dinis Dias discovers the Cap-Vert, on the western coast of Africa.
- Vlad II Dracul, aided by a crusaders' fleet from Burgundy, attacks Giurgiu, and massacres the Ottoman garrison after their surrender.
- Stephen II remains sole ruler of Moldavia.
- Rai Sahra becomes the first Sultan of Multan as Qutb-ud-Din Mahmud.

== Births ==
- March 16 – Johann Geiler von Kaisersberg, Swiss-born priest (d. 1510)
- April 4 – Wiguleus Fröschl of Marzoll, Bishop of Passau (1500–1517) (d. 1517)
- October 25 – Fulk Bourchier, 10th Baron FitzWarin, English baron (d. 1479)
- October 31 – Hedwig, Abbess of Quedlinburg, Princess-Abbess of Quedlinburg (d. 1511)
- December 11 – Eberhard I, Duke of Württemberg (d. 1496)
- date unknown – Albert Brudzewski, Polish astronomer (d. 1497)
- probable – Nicolas Chuquet, French mathematician
- approximate – Sandro Botticelli, Italian painter (d. 1510)

== Deaths ==
- January 19 – Antonio Correr, Venetian cardinal (b. 1359)
- February 19 – Leonor of Aragon, queen of Portugal (b. 1402)
- April 7 – Louis VIII of Bavaria, German noble (b. 1403)
- May 15 – Johanna van Polanen, Dutch noblewoman (b. 1392)
- June 5 – Leonel Power, English composer
- July 15 – Joan Beaufort, Queen of Scotland
- August 2 – Oswald von Wolkenstein, Austrian composer (b. 1377)
- date unknown – Olug Moxammat of Kazan, Khan of Kazan
