= 1470 in Ireland =

- Centuries: 13th; 14th; 15th; 16th; 17th
- Decades: 1450s; 1460s; 1470s; 1480s; 1490s
- See also: Other events of 1470; List of years in Ireland

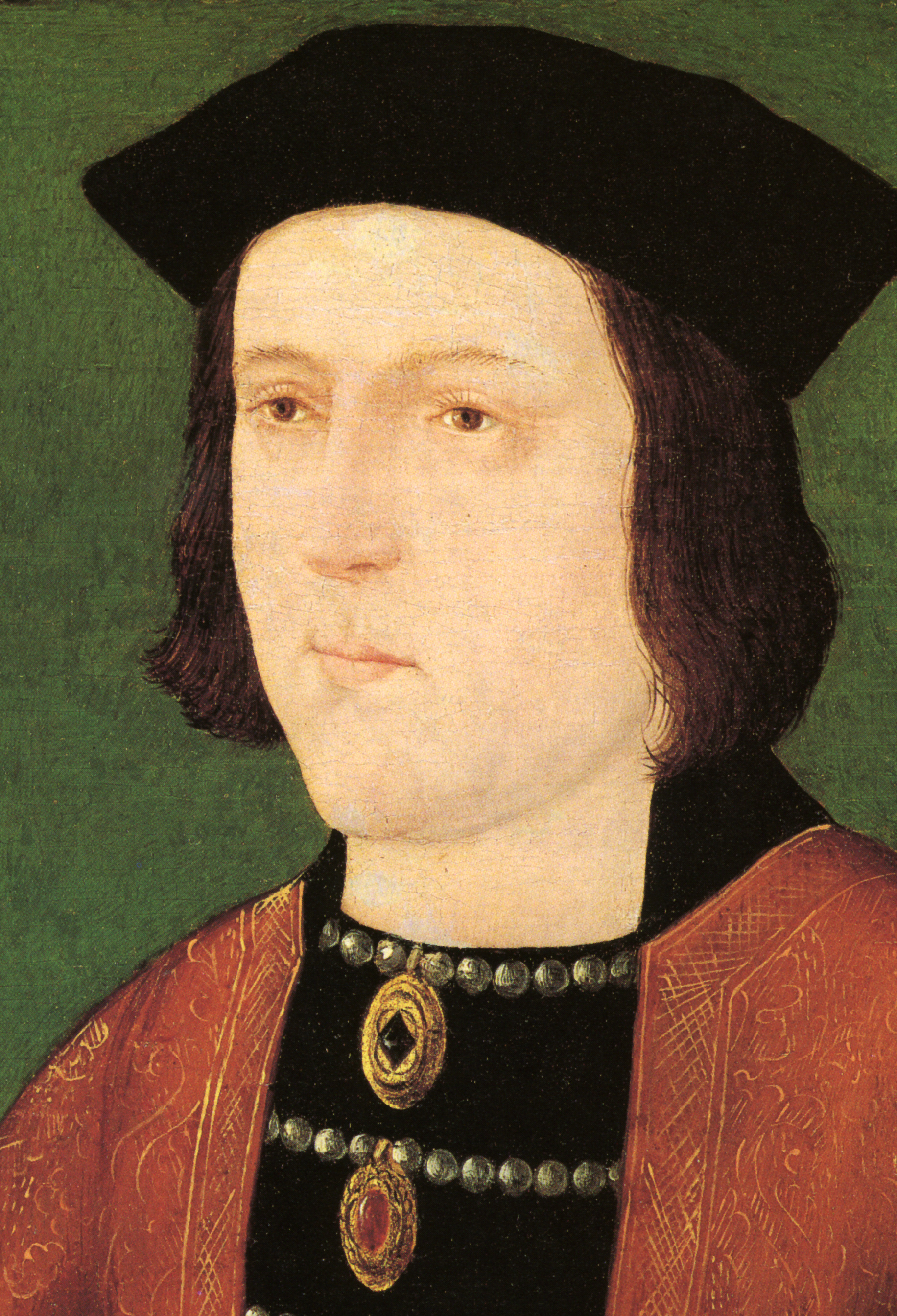
Edward IV, Lord of Ireland until 3 October 1470

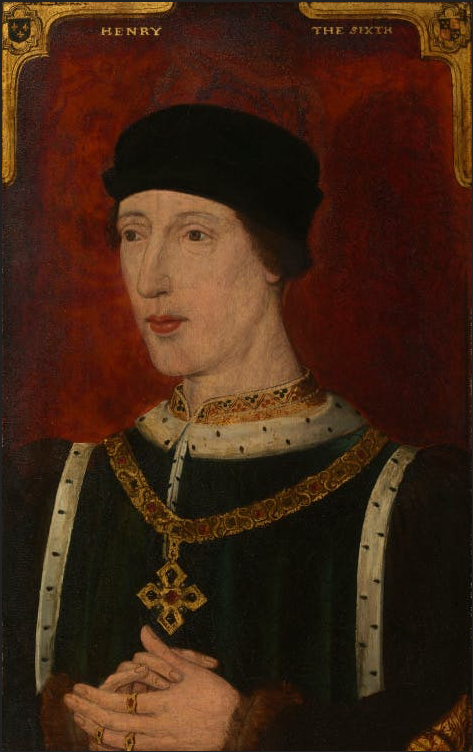
Henry VI, Lord of Ireland from 3 October 1470

Events from the year 1470 in Ireland.

== Incumbents ==
- Lord:
  - Edward IV of England (until 3 October 1470)
  - Henry VI of England (from 3 October 1470)
- Lord Deputy of Ireland: Thomas FitzGerald, 7th Earl of Kildare
- Archbishop of Dublin: Michael Tregury
- Archbishop of Armagh: John Bole

== Events ==
- In Fermanagh, Philip Mag Uidhir, son of Thomas Mag Uidhir, died. The Annals of Ulster record him as a member of the ruling family of Fermanagh and the expected successor to the lordship.
- Henry Ó Néill, son of Eoghan Ó Néill, led an expedition into Clann Aedha Buidhe in alliance with Mac Uidhilin (MacQuillan). The forces of Ó Néill and Mac Uidhilin defeated Clann Aedha Buidhe. Aodh Ó Néill the younger, son of Aodh the Tawny, was captured, along with several other prominent figures. Art, son of Domhnall Ó Néill the Slender, was killed. The victorious forces captured the castle of Sgathdergi and entrusted it to Mac Uidhilin.
- The Irish Parliament passed legislation concerning relations between the Pale and neighbouring Gaelic lordships. The inhabitants of Saggart were ordered to abandon their truce with the O'Tooles.
- Royal authority settled several legal and property matters. Margaret Butler, widow of William Butler, received dower rights in the manors of Dunboyne and Moymet. Pardons for treasons and related offences were granted to John fitz-Gerrot and Nicholas Plunket. Plunket also received restoration of his lands. The Archbishop of Dublin's rights over Lambay Island were confirmed.
- The Irish Parliament authorised levies for the construction of towers at Readstown and Bellewstown in County Meath.

== Deaths ==
- 18 October - John Tiptoft, 1st Earl of Worcester, former Lord Deputy of Ireland and Yorkist statesman.

== See also ==
- History of Ireland (1169–1536)
- Lordship of Ireland

== Sources ==
- Connolly, Sean J. (2007). Contested Island: Ireland 1460–1630. Oxford University Press.
- Simms, Katharine (1987). From Kings to Warlords: The Changing Political Structure of Gaelic Ireland in the Later Middle Ages. Boydell Press.
- Otway-Ruthven, A. J. (1980). A History of Medieval Ireland. Barnes & Noble.
- "Annals of Ulster". University College Cork.
- "Irish Statute Book: 10 Edward IV (1470)".
