= 1473 in Ireland =

- Centuries: 13th; 14th; 15th; 16th; 17th
- Decades: 1450s; 1460s; 1470s; 1480s; 1490s
- See also: Other events of 1473; List of years in Ireland

Events from the year 1473 in Ireland.

== Incumbent ==
- Lord: Edward IV

== Events ==
- Gilbert Debenham, future Chancellor of Ireland sent as emissary to Ireland
- Iollan Mac an Leagha began writing the work which would be categorised as "MS Celtique I" by the Bibliothèque Nationale de France, a work which would be finished by his son, Maoleachloinn.
- Aodh Ó hEidirsgeóil / Odo O'Driscoll, made Bishop of Ross

=== October ===
- Thomas Butler, 7th Earl of Ormond, pardoned for his loyalties during the Wars of the Roses

== Deaths ==
- Risdeárd de Búrca, 6th Mac William Íochtar
- Domhnall Ó Donnobháin, Bishop of Ross

== Sources ==
- Fryde, E. B.; Greenway, D. E.; Porter, S.; Roy, I., eds. (1986). Handbook of British Chronology (3rd, reprinted 2003 ed.). Cambridge: Cambridge University Press. ISBN 0-521-56350-X.
- Moody, T. W.; Martin, F. X.; Byrne, F. J., eds. (1984). Maps, Genealogies, Lists: A Companion to Irish History, Part II. A New History of Ireland. Vol. IX. Oxford: Oxford University Press. ISBN 0-19-821745-5.
