= 1466 in Ireland =

- Centuries: 13th; 14th; 15th; 16th; 17th
- Decades: 1440s; 1450s; 1460s; 1470s; 1480s
- See also: Other events of 1466; List of years in Ireland

Events from the year 1466 in Ireland.

== Events ==
- Thomas FitzGerald, 7th Earl of Desmond, serving as Lord Deputy of Ireland, leads an expedition against O'Connor Faly.
