= 1465 in Ireland =

- Centuries: 13th; 14th; 15th; 16th; 17th
- Decades: 1440s; 1450s; 1460s; 1470s; 1480s
- See also: Other events of 1465; List of years in Ireland

Events from the year 1465 in Ireland.

== Events ==
- May – John Tiptoft, 1st Earl of Worcester, is appointed as deputy lieutenant of Ireland by King Edward IV.
- The Parliament of Ireland passes the City of Cork Act 1465.
