= 1471 in Ireland =

- Centuries: 13th; 14th; 15th; 16th; 17th
- Decades: 1450s; 1460s; 1470s; 1480s; 1490s
- See also: Other events of 1471; List of years in Ireland

Events from the year 1471 in Ireland.

== Events ==
- 6 December – John Foxal appointed Archbishop of Armagh following death of John Bole

== Deaths ==
- John Bole, Archbishop of Armagh
- Michael Tregury, Archbishop of Dublin
