= 1524 =

1524 in various calendars
- Gregorian calendar: 1524; MDXXIV
- Ab urbe condita: 2277
- Armenian calendar: 973; ԹՎ ՋՀԳ
- Assyrian calendar: 6274
- Balinese saka calendar: 1445–1446
- Bengali calendar: 930–931
- Berber calendar: 2474
- English Regnal year: 15 Hen. 8 – 16 Hen. 8
- Buddhist calendar: 2068
- Burmese calendar: 886
- Byzantine calendar: 7032–7033
- Chinese calendar: 癸未年 (Water Goat); 4221 or 4014 — to — 甲申年 (Wood Monkey); 4222 or 4015
- Coptic calendar: 1240–1241
- Discordian calendar: 2690
- Ethiopian calendar: 1516–1517
- Hebrew calendar: 5284–5285
- Hindu calendars
- Vikram Samvat: 1580–1581
- Shaka Samvat: 1445–1446
- Kali Yuga: 4624–4625
- Holocene calendar: 11524
- Igbo calendar: 524–525
- Iranian calendar: 902–903
- Islamic calendar: 930–931
- Japanese calendar: Daiei 4 (大永４年)
- Javanese calendar: 1442–1443
- Julian calendar: 1524; MDXXIV
- Korean calendar: 3857
- Minguo calendar: 388 before ROC 民前388年
- Nanakshahi calendar: 56
- Thai solar calendar: 2066–2067
- Tibetan calendar: ཆུ་མོ་ལུག་ལོ་ (female Water-Sheep); 1650 or 1269 or 497 — to — ཤིང་ཕོ་སྤྲེ་ལོ་ (male Wood-Monkey); 1651 or 1270 or 498

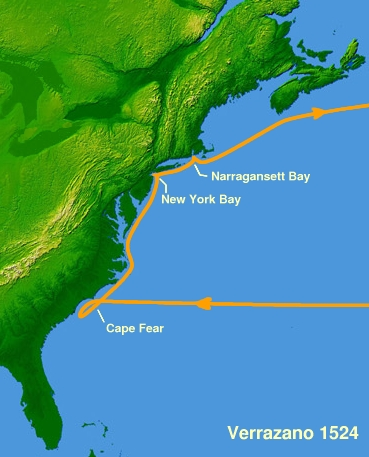
March 21 — April 17 –: Giovanni da Verrazzano and the crew of La Dauphine reach the North American eastern coast and sail northward.

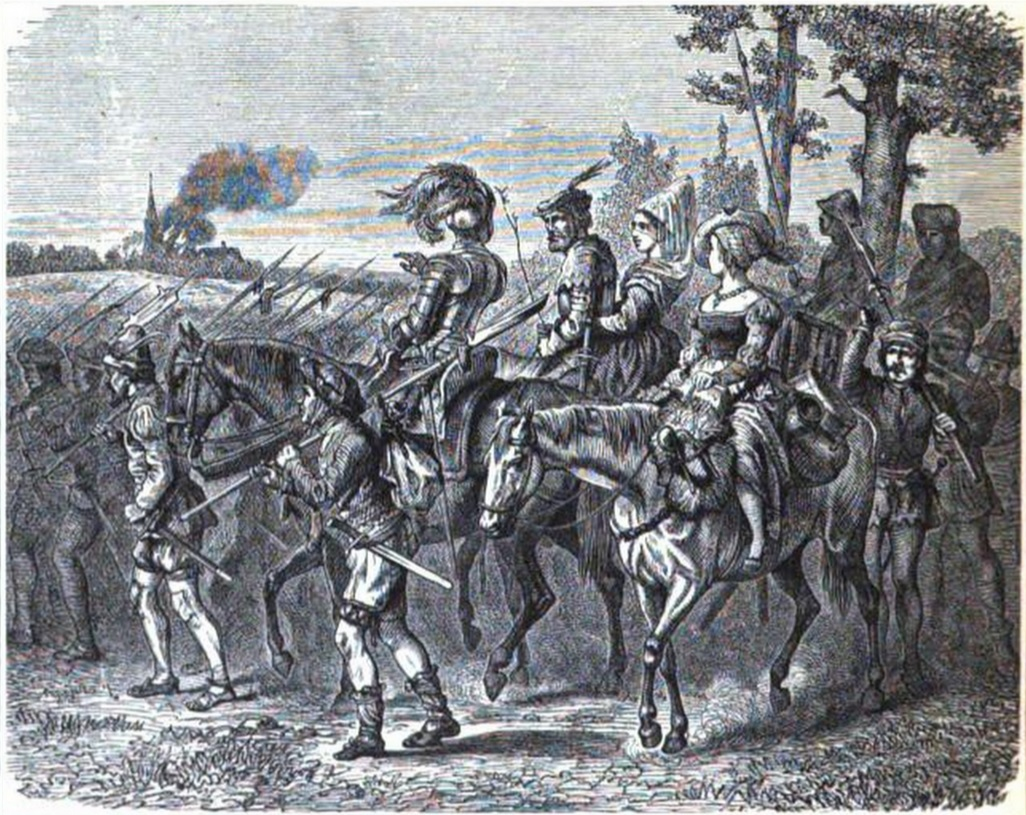
Start of the German Peasants' War.

Year 1524 (MDXXIV) was a leap year starting on Friday of the Julian calendar.

== Events ==
=== January–March ===
- January 17 – Florentine explorer Giovanni da Verrazzano, on board La Dauphine in the service of Francis I of France, sets out from Madeira for the New World, to seek out a western sea route to the Pacific Ocean.
- February 20 – Tecun Uman, the K'iche' Maya ruler of Guatemala's highlands, is killed in a battle near Quetzaltenango between the K'iche' Maya people and the invading Spanish conquistadors led by Pedro Alvarado.
- March 7 – Spanish conquistador Pedro de Alvarado destroys the Kʼicheʼ kingdom of Qʼumarkaj, taking the capital, Quiché.
- March 21 – da Verrazzano's expedition makes landfall at Cape Fear at what is later the U.S. state of North Carolina.

=== April–June ===
- April 17 – Verrazzano's expedition makes the first European entry into New York Bay, and sights the island of Manhattan.
- April 30 – Battle of the Sesia: Spanish forces under Charles de Lannoy defeat the French army in Italy, under William de Bonnivet. The French, now commanded by François de St. Pol, withdraw from the Italian Peninsula.
- May 23 – Tahmasp I becomes the ruler of the Safavid Empire, following the death of his father, Shah Ismail I.
- May 26 – Atiquipaque, the most important city of the Xinca people, is conquered by the Spanish, resulting in a significant reduction in the Xinca population.
- June 8 – Battle of Acajutla: Spanish conquistador Pedro de Alvarado defeats a battalion of Pipiles, in the neighborhoods of present day Acajutla, El Salvador.

=== July–September ===
- July 8 – Verrazzano's expedition returns to Dieppe.
- August 5 – Two days before his coronation in Denmark, Frederick I is elected King of Norway.
- August 7 – The coronation of Frederick I of Denmark takes place in Copenhagen.
- August 20 – The French city of Marseille is besieged by Holy Roman Empire forces commanded by the Charles III, Duke of Bourbon and lasts until September 26.
- August 22 – Protestant theologians Martin Luther and Andreas Karlstadt dispute at Jena.
- August 24 – German Peasants' War: Hans Müller von Bulgenbach gathered peasants in Stühlingen and formed the "Evangelical Brotherhood", pledging to emancipate peasants across Germany. A revolt spread in southwestern Germany.
- September 1 – By the Treaty of Malmö signed on Sweden withdraws from the Kalmar Union with Denmark, Norway and Sweden.
- September 5 – Portuguese explorer Vasco da Gama arrives on the island of Goa to become the new Viceroy of Portuguese India but dies three months later.
- September 13 – Spanish conquistador Francisco Pizarro, Hernando de Luque and Diego de Almagro all set off on the first of three expeditions to conquer Peru, taking along 80 men and 40 horses, but the venture is halted in Colombia.
- September 23 – The Bundesbrief is adopted by the members of the Three Leagues of Switzerland (the League of God's House, the League of the Ten Jurisdictions, and the Grey League) as a common constitution.

=== October–December ===
- October 28 – A French army invading Italy, under King Francis, besieges Pavia, months before the Battle of Pavia.
- November 1 – John Fleming, 2nd Lord Fleming, Lord Chancellor of Scotland since 1517, is assassinated by John Tweedie of Drummelzier (chief of Clan Tweedie) and others.
- November 15 – The Treaty of Tordesillas is signed between representatives of Honoré I, Lord of Monaco and of King Charles of Spain, and places Monaco under the protection of Spain.
- December 8 – Francisco Hernandez de Cordoba founds the city of Granada, Nicaragua, the oldest Hispanic city in the mainland America.

== Births ==
- February 10 – Albrecht Giese, German politician and diplomat (d. 1580)
- February 17 – Charles, Cardinal of Lorraine, French cardinal (d. 1574)
- May 28 – Selim II, Ottoman Sultan (d. 1574)
- June 12 – Achilles Statius, Portuguese humanist (d. 1581)
- June 24 – Johann Stössel, German theologian (d. 1576)
- August 23 – François Hotman, French Protestant lawyer and writer (d. 1590)
- September 7 – Thomas Erastus, Swiss theologian (d. 1583)
- September 11 – Pierre de Ronsard, French poet (d. 1585)
- October 4 – Francisco Vallés, Spanish physician (d. 1592)
- October 5 – Rani Durgavati, Queen of Gond (d. 1564)
- October 9 – Ottavio Farnese, Duke of Parma (d. 1586)
- October 14 – Elizabeth of Denmark, Duchess of Mecklenburg, Danish princess (d. 1586)
- October 16 – Nicolas, Duke of Mercœur, French Catholic bishop (d. 1577)
- November 12 – Diego de Landa, Bishop of the Yucatán (d. 1579)
- date unknown
  - Jan Borukowski, royal secretary of Poland (d. 1584)
  - Armand de Gontaut, Baron of Biron, French soldier (d. 1592)
  - Jean Pithou, French lawyer and author (d. 1602); and his twin brother, Nicolas Pithou, French lawyer and author (d. 1598)
  - Joseph Nasi, Portuguese Sephardi diplomat and administrator (d. 1579)
  - Thomas Tusser, English poet and farmer (d. 1580)
  - Luís de Camões, Portuguese poet (d. 1580)
  - Plautilla Nelli, Italian painter (d. 1588)
  - Wenceslaus III Adam, Duke of Cieszyn (d. 1579)
  - Catherine Carey, cousin of Elizabeth I of England (d. 1569)
  - Guyonne de Laval, French Huguenot magnate (d. 1567)
- possible
  - Catherine Howard, fifth queen of Henry VIII of England, (b. between 1518 and 1524; d. 1542)

== Deaths ==
- January 5 – Marko Marulić, Croatian poet (b. 1450)
- January 6 – Amalie of the Palatinate, duchess consort of Pomerania (b. 1490)
- February 10 – Catherine of Saxony, Archduchess of Austria (b. 1468)
- February 11 – Isabella of Aragon, Duchess of Milan, daughter of King Alfonso II of Naples (b. 1470)
- February 20 – Tecun Uman, Kʼicheʼ Mayan ruler (b. c. 1500)
- March 28
  - Elisabeth of Brandenburg, Duchess of Württemberg (b. 1451)
  - Ingrid Persdotter, Swedish nun and letter writer
- April 14 – William Conyers, 1st Baron Conyers, English baron (b. 1468)
- April 30 – Pierre Terrail, seigneur de Bayard, French soldier (b. 1473)
- May 17 – Francesco Soderini, Italian Catholic cardinal (b. 1453)
- May 21 – Thomas Howard, 2nd Duke of Norfolk, English soldier and statesman (b. 1443)
- May 23 – Ismail I, Safavid dynasty Shah of Persia (b. 1487)
- May 31 – Camilla Battista da Varano, Italian Roman Catholic nun and saint (b. 1458)
- June 12 – Diego Velázquez de Cuéllar, Spanish conquistador (b. 1465)
- July 9 – Sibylle of Brandenburg, Duchess of Jülich and Berg (b. 1467)
- July 20 – Claude of France, queen consort of Francis I of France (b. 1499)
- August 4 – Helen of the Palatinate, Duchess of Pomerania (b. 1493)
- August 24 – Sir William Scott, English Lord Warden of the Cinque Ports (b. 1459)
- September 18 – Charlotte of Valois, French princess (b. 1516)
- October 5 – Joachim Patinir, Flemish landscape painter (b. c. 1480)
- October 20 – Thomas Linacre, English humanist and physician (b. 1460)
- October 26 – Philip II, Count of Waldeck-Eisenberg (1486–1524) (b. 1453)
- November 12 – Juan Rodríguez de Fonseca, Spanish archbishop and courtier (b. 1451)
- December 24 – Vasco da Gama, Portuguese explorer (b. c. 1469)
- date unknown
  - Hans Holbein the Elder, German painter (b. 1460)
  - Andrea Solari, Italian painter (b. 1460)
  - Tang Yin, Chinese painter (b. 1470)
