= 1459 in Ireland =

- Centuries: 13th; 14th; 15th; 16th; 17th
- Decades: 1430s; 1440s; 1450s; 1460s; 1470s
- See also: Other events of 1459; List of years in Ireland

Events from the year 1459 in Ireland.

== Incumbent ==
- Lord: Henry VI

== Events ==
- Richard Duke of York, Lord Lieutenant of Ireland, returns on a second visit to Ireland.
- Irish Parliament, meeting at Drogheda, upholds Richard Duke of York's authority against Henry VI and an English Act of Attainder.

== Births ==
- James FitzGerald, 8th Earl of Desmond

== Deaths ==
Edmund Oldhall, an English-born cleric and judge in fifteenth-century Ireland. He was Bishop of Meath and acting Lord Chancellor of Ireland. He was a brother of the leading Yorkist statesman Sir William Oldhall.
