= 1463 in Ireland =

- Centuries: 13th; 14th; 15th; 16th; 17th
- Decades: 1440s; 1450s; 1460s; 1470s; 1480s
- See also: Other events of 1463; List of years in Ireland

Events from the year 1463 in Ireland.

== Incumbent ==
- Lord: Edward IV

== Events ==
- Act of Parliament - Irish Coinage (mintmaster appointed).
