= 1401 =

1401 in various calendars
- Gregorian calendar: 1401; MCDI
- Ab urbe condita: 2154
- Armenian calendar: 850; ԹՎ ՊԾ
- Assyrian calendar: 6151
- Balinese saka calendar: 1322–1323
- Bengali calendar: 807–808
- Berber calendar: 2351
- English Regnal year: 2 Hen. 4 – 3 Hen. 4
- Buddhist calendar: 1945
- Burmese calendar: 763
- Byzantine calendar: 6909–6910
- Chinese calendar: 庚辰年 (Metal Dragon); 4098 or 3891 — to — 辛巳年 (Metal Snake); 4099 or 3892
- Coptic calendar: 1117–1118
- Discordian calendar: 2567
- Ethiopian calendar: 1393–1394
- Hebrew calendar: 5161–5162
- Hindu calendars
- Vikram Samvat: 1457–1458
- Shaka Samvat: 1322–1323
- Kali Yuga: 4501–4502
- Holocene calendar: 11401
- Igbo calendar: 401–402
- Iranian calendar: 779–780
- Islamic calendar: 803–804
- Japanese calendar: Ōei 8 (応永８年)
- Javanese calendar: 1315–1316
- Julian calendar: 1401; MCDI
- Korean calendar: 3734
- Minguo calendar: 511 before ROC 民前511年
- Nanakshahi calendar: −67
- Thai solar calendar: 1943–1944
- Tibetan calendar: ལྕགས་ཕོ་འབྲུག་ལོ་ (male Iron-Dragon); 1527 or 1146 or 374 — to — ལྕགས་མོ་སྦྲུལ་ལོ་ (female Iron-Snake); 1528 or 1147 or 375

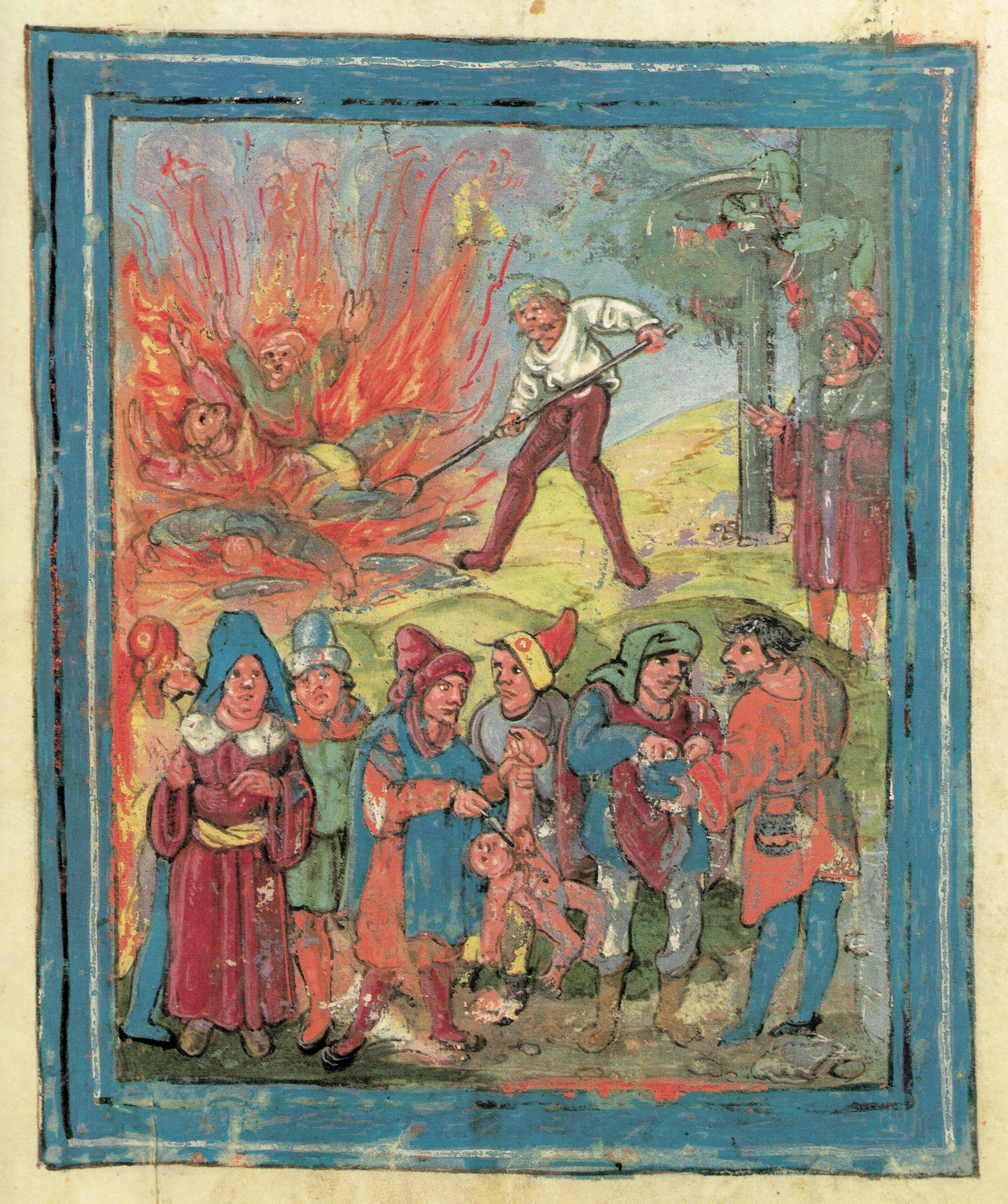
June 25: The Schaffhausen massacre takes place in Switzerland.

Year 1401 (MCDI) was a common year starting on Saturday of the Julian calendar.

== Events ==
=== January–March ===
- January 6 – Rupert, King of Germany, is crowned King of the Romans at Cologne.
- January 12 – Emperor Hồ Quý Ly of Dai Ngu (now Vietnam) passes the throne to his son, Hồ Hán Thương.
- January 16 – After their disastrous defeat on December 25 in the Battle of Dongchang in the Jingnan campaign, the forces of the Principality of Yan within China return to Beiping (located at the site of present-day Beijing).
- January 20 – The Parliament of England is opened at Westminster by King Henry IV.
- February 3 – The Byzantine Emperor Manuel II Palaiologos, who has spent almost two months in England as the guest of King Henry IV, accepts a payment of 3,000 English gold marks in support of an alliance between the two nations, then makes plans to depart England for France.
- February 16 –
  - Jingnan campaign: After a month's recovery from defeat in battle in China, Prince Zhu Di mobilizes his troops at Beijing and marches south to fight the Ming dynasty Emperor Huizong.
  - John Barry is appointed as the new Attorney-General for Ireland.
- March 2 – William Sawtrey, a Roman Catholic priest and adherent to the Lollard faith becomes the first person in England to be burned at the stake under the new De heretico comburendo law (officially the Suppression of Heresy Act 1400), dying at Smithfield, London after being convicted of heresy against the Roman Catholic faith.
- March 10 – As the English Parliament session closes, King Henry IV gives royal assent to the Suppression of Heresy Act, permitting secular authorities to carry out punishment for religious crimes. The assent comes after the Archbishop of Canterbury pressures King Henry to outlaw the Lollards, followers of John Wycliffe, and criminalizes possession of a copy of Wycliffe's translation of the Bible.
- March 13 – The Samogitians, supported by Grand Duke Vytautas of Lithuania, rebel against the Teutonic knights and burn two castles. Vytautas is granted increased autonomy by King Jogaila of the Poland–Lithuania union.
- March 17 – Turko-Mongol Emperor Timur sacks Damascus.
- March 22 – Jingnan campaign: Prince Zhu Di of Yan leads his troops across the Jia River into the Heibei province. China's Ming dynasty Emperor Huizong directs that Zhu Di is not to be killed.

=== April–June ===
- April 1 – Conwy Castle in English-ruled North Wales, is captured on Good Friday by trickery by two Welsh brothers, Rhys ap Tudur and Gwilym ap Tudur of the Island of Anglesey, in support of the anti-English rebellion led by Owain Glyndŵr.
- April 28 – King Zsigmond of Hungary refuses to comply with demands of the Archbishop John Kanizsai and the Palatine Derek Bebek, he is taken prisoner. Sigismund remains captive until October 29.
- May 6 – The council of the Republic of Venice passes a law prohibiting the Republic's executive, the Doge, from using the state owned official ship, the bucentaur, from being used for private purposes.
- May 25 – Maria, Queen of Sicily since 1377 since succeeding her father, King Frederick the Simple, dies after a reign of almost 34 years.
- May 31 – Laurence Allerthorp becomes the new Lord High Treasurer of England, succeeding Sir John Norbury.
- June 15 – Jingnan campaign: The rebel Yan forces destroy the food supplies of the Ming Chinese government at Dezhou.
- June 24 – (13th day of 5th month Ōei 8) The shogun Ashikaga Yoshimitsu dispatches a mission to Ming Dynasty China as the first step of opening trade between the two nations.
- June 25 – The Schaffhausen massacre of 30 Jewish residents, by burning, of the town of Schaffhausen takes place in Switzerland after the April 3 murder of 4-year-old Konrad Lori.
- June – The English Pale in Ireland is reduced to Dublin, County Kildare, County Louth, and County Meath.

=== July–September ===
- July 9 – (27 Dhu al-Qadah 803 A.H.) Timur raids the city of Baghdad, in the Jalayirid Empire, then carries out a massacre of its inhabitants, including women and children, as punishment for resisting his rule. According to accounts later, "90,000 human heads were piled up on the public places of the town." The only persons spared death are "theologians, shaikhs and dervishes", and the only buildings not demolished are "mosques, universities and hostels."
- July 15 – Jingnan campaign: Chinese Empire troops, led by Fang Zhao, launch a raid on the Yan principality capital at Beiping, forcing Yan PrinceZhu Di to bring his troops back north.
- August 5 – The County of Geneva, located in southeastern France in the Auvergne-Rhône-Alpes region, comes to an end after more than 300 years when it is sold to Amadeus VIII, Count of Savoy for 45,000 gold francs
- September 18 – Jingnan campaign: The Yan principality defeats the Chinese imperial forces at Beiping after a siege of more than two months.
- September 24 – The late English cleric John Twenge (1320-1379) is canonized as Saint John of Bridlington by Pope Boniface IX

=== October–December ===
- October 14 – Sultan Nasir-ud-Din Mahmud Shah Tughluq of Delhi is restored to power.
- October 29 – King Zsigmond of Hungary is released from imprisonment by order of the Royal Council.
- November 2 – The Battle of Tuthill takes place at Caernarfon in Wales as Owain Glyndŵr loses 300 soldiers in an attack by the English Army.
- December 2 – Jingnan campaign: Rebel General Zhu Di adopts a new approach in his war against the Chinese Imperial troops and departs from Beiping to drive troops southward to the Yangtze River, capturing Dong'e, Dongping, Wenshang, and Pei over the next two months.

=== Date unknown ===
- Dilawar Khan establishes the Malwa Sultanate in present-day northern India.
- The Joseon dynasty in present-day Korea officially enters into a tributary relationship with Ming dynasty China.
- Japan re-enters into a tributary relationship with China.

== Births ==
- March 27 – Albert III, Duke of Bavaria-Munich (d. 1460)
- May 10 – Thomas Tuddenham, Landowner (d. 1462)
- May 12 – Emperor Shōkō of Japan (d. 1428)
- July 23 – Francesco I Sforza, Italian condottiero (d. 1466)
- September 14 – Maria of Castile, Queen of Aragon, Queen consort of Aragon and Naples (d. 1458)
- October 27 – Catherine of Valois, queen consort of England from 1420 until 1422 (d. 1437)
- November 26 – Henry Beaufort, 2nd Earl of Somerset (d. 1418)
- December 21 – Tommaso Masaccio, Italian painter (d. 1428)
- date unknown
  - Charles I, Duke of Bourbon (d. 1456)
  - Jacqueline, Countess of Hainaut (d. 1436)
- probable – Nicholas of Cusa, German philosopher, mathematician and astronomer (d. 1464)

== Deaths ==
- January 19 – Robert Bealknap, British justice
- March – William Sawtrey, English Lollard martyr (burned at the stake)
- April 8 or August 8 – Thomas de Beauchamp, 12th Earl of Warwick (b. 1338)
- May 25 – Queen Maria of Sicily (b. 1363)
- September 14 – Dobrogost of Nowy Dwór, Polish bishop (b. 1355)
- October – Anabella Drummond, queen of Scotland
- October 19 – John Charleton, 4th Baron Cherleton (b. 1362)
- October 20 – Klaus Störtebeker, German pirate
- November 25 – King Tarabya of Ava (b. 1368)
- date unknown – Andronikos Asen Zaccaria, Baron of Chalandritsa and Arcadia, Grand Constable of Achaea
