= 1461 in Ireland =

- Centuries: 13th; 14th; 15th; 16th; 17th
- Decades: 1440s; 1450s; 1460s; 1470s; 1480s
- See also: Other events of 1461; List of years in Ireland

Events from the year 1461 in Ireland.

== Incumbent ==
- Lord: Henry VI (until 4 March), then Edward IV

== Deaths ==
- May 1 – James Butler, 5th Earl of Ormonde, Lord Lieutenant (b. 1420)
