= A Fragment of Irish Annals =

Irish annal published in 1981

A Fragment of Irish Annals or Oxford University Collection 103 is an Irish annal, published by Brian Ó Cuív in 1981. The text is believed to date from the years 1467–68 or immediately after and covers only these two years. It is kept at the Bodleian Library, Oxford University, where it is listed as Oxford Univ. Coll. 103.

== See also ==
- Irish annals
- Short Annals of Tirconaill
