= 1460 in Ireland =

- Centuries: 13th; 14th; 15th; 16th; 17th
- Decades: 1440s; 1450s; 1460s; 1470s; 1480s
- See also: Other events of 1460; List of years in Ireland

Events from the year 1460 in Ireland.

== Incumbent ==
- Lord: Henry VI

== Events ==
- Richard Duke of York, Lord Lieutenant of Ireland, returns to England.
- Ireland’s legislative independence is declared.
