= 1498 =

1498 in various calendars
- Gregorian calendar: 1498; MCDXCVIII
- Ab urbe condita: 2251
- Armenian calendar: 947; ԹՎ ՋԽԷ
- Assyrian calendar: 6248
- Balinese saka calendar: 1419–1420
- Bengali calendar: 904–905
- Berber calendar: 2448
- English Regnal year: 13 Hen. 7 – 14 Hen. 7
- Buddhist calendar: 2042
- Burmese calendar: 860
- Byzantine calendar: 7006–7007
- Chinese calendar: 丁巳年 (Fire Snake); 4195 or 3988 — to — 戊午年 (Earth Horse); 4196 or 3989
- Coptic calendar: 1214–1215
- Discordian calendar: 2664
- Ethiopian calendar: 1490–1491
- Hebrew calendar: 5258–5259
- Hindu calendars
- Vikram Samvat: 1554–1555
- Shaka Samvat: 1419–1420
- Kali Yuga: 4598–4599
- Holocene calendar: 11498
- Igbo calendar: 498–499
- Iranian calendar: 876–877
- Islamic calendar: 903–904
- Japanese calendar: Meiō 7 (明応７年)
- Javanese calendar: 1415–1416
- Julian calendar: 1498; MCDXCVIII
- Korean calendar: 3831
- Minguo calendar: 414 before ROC 民前414年
- Nanakshahi calendar: 30
- Thai solar calendar: 2040–2041
- Tibetan calendar: མེ་མོ་སྦྲུལ་ལོ་ (female Fire-Snake); 1624 or 1243 or 471 — to — ས་ཕོ་རྟ་ལོ་ (male Earth-Horse); 1625 or 1244 or 472

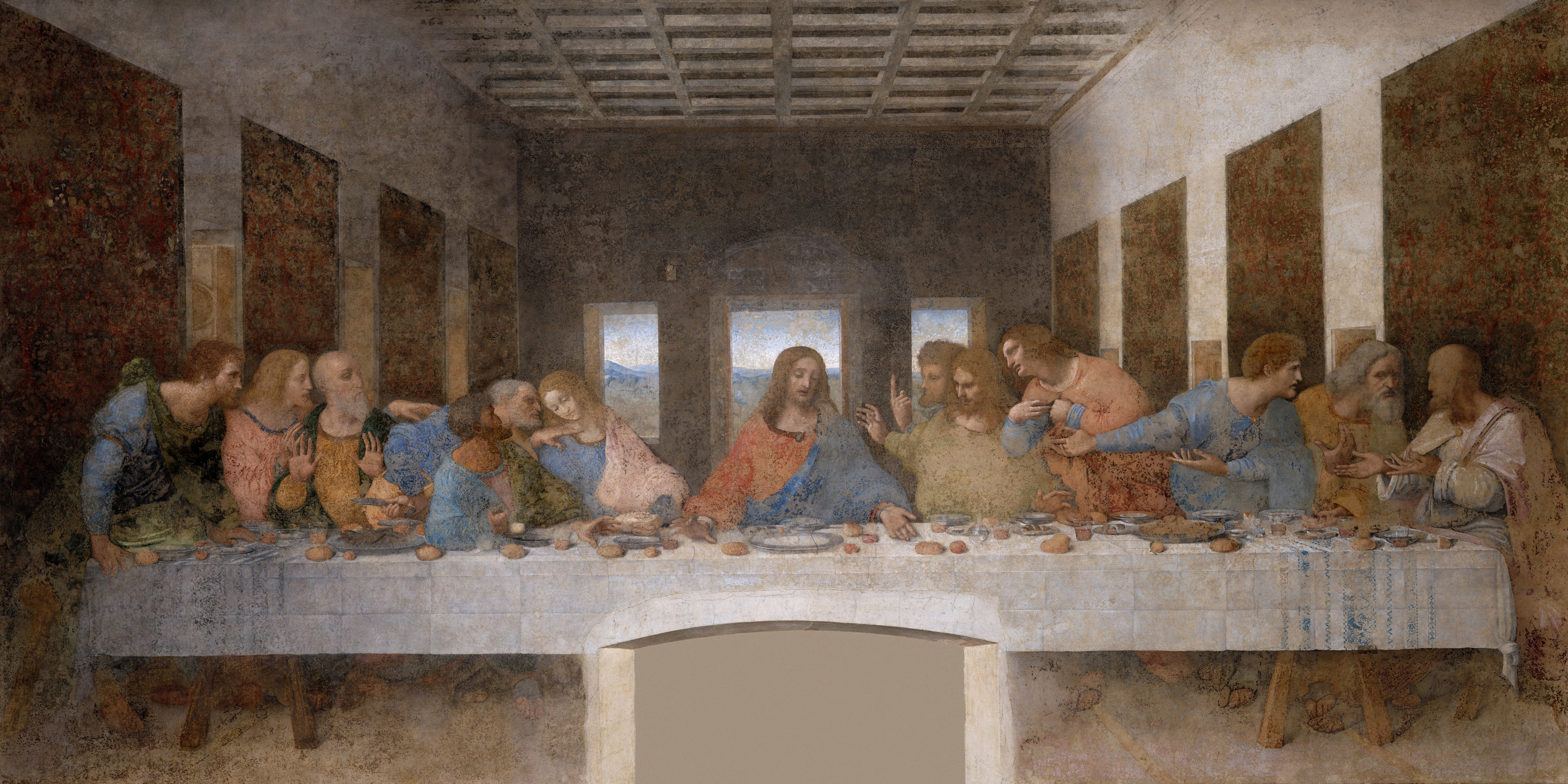
February 9: Leonardo da Vinci completes his painting of The Last Supper.

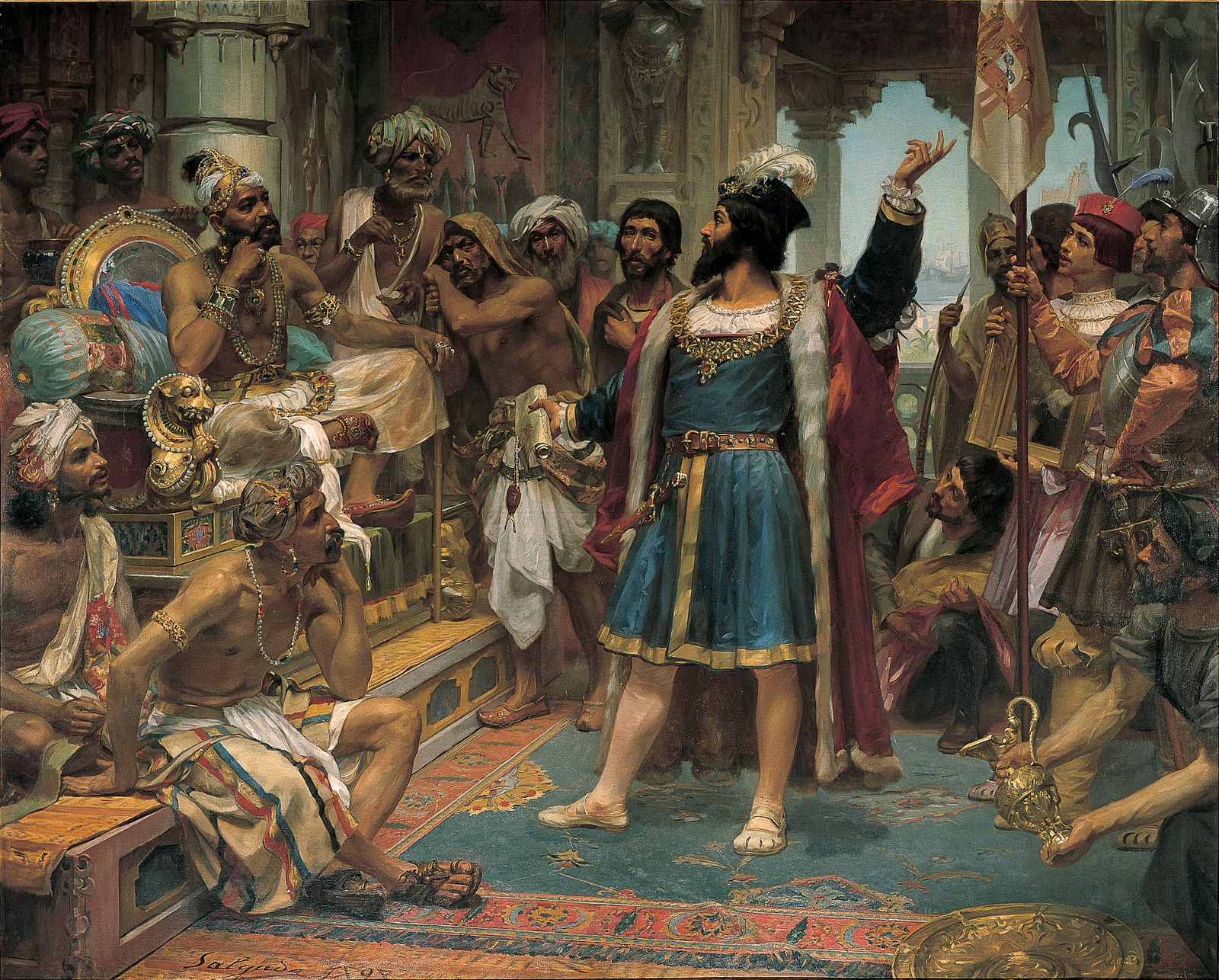
May 17: Vasco da Gama reaches India by sea and opens the first sea route between Europe and Asia.

Year 1498 (MCDXCVIII) was a common year starting on Monday of the Julian calendar, the 1498th year of the Common Era (CE) and Anno Domini (AD) designations, the 498th year of the 2nd millennium, the 98th year of the 15th century, and the 9th and pre-final year of the 1490s decade.

== Events ==
=== January–March ===
- January 28 – In a letter to the Archbishop of Canterbury, who is also the Chancellor of the English treasury, King Henry VII of England formally authorizes, from his own funds, declares that "we, for certain considerations us especially moving, have given and granted unto our well-beloved John Calbot of the parts of Venice an annuity or annual rent of £20 sterling, to be had and yearly perceived from the Feast of the Annunciation of our Lady last past, during our pleasure, of our customs and subsidies growing in our port of Bristol by the hands of our customs there for the time being, at Michaelmas and Easter, by even portions.
- February 3 – King Henry grants John Cabot a royal patent for a second westward sea voyage toward North America, with hopes that Cabot will discover a seaward route to Asia. The patent declares that "By thiesee presentes geve and graunte to our well beloved John Kaboto, Venecian, sufficient auctorite and power that he may take at his pleasure vi englisshe shippes and theym convey and lede to the londe and Iles of late founde y the seid John in our name." The expedition launches in early May, but with fewer ships than promised.
- February 9 – Leonardo da Vinci completes his painting The Last Supper, on the refectory wall of Milan's Santa Maria delle Grazie Convent. Because the location is a thin exterior wall, the effects of humidity and moisture-retaining rock behind the wall begin to cause the painting to deteriorate.
- March 2 – Vasco da Gama visits Quelimane and Mozambique, in southeastern Africa.
- March 21 – In Friesland, in the Netherlands, during the ongoing civil war between the Vetkopers and Schieringers, the Schieringers seek out the help of Albrecht III, Duke of Saxony at the cost of losing Frisian independence.

=== April–June ===
- April 7 – Louis XII becomes the new King of France upon the death of his wife's brother, King Charles VIII. King Charles had struck his head on the top of a door frame while on his way to watch a tennis match at Amboise.
- April 14 – Portuguese explorer Vasco da Gama reaches Malindi, in modern-day Kenya.
- May 17 – Portuguese navigator Vasco da Gama arrives at Calicut (modern-day Kozhikode), India, becoming the first European to get there by sailing around Africa, thus discovering the maritime route to India. He finds a local Arab merchant who is able to interpret for him.
- May 21 – In England, the members of the Company of Merchant Adventurers of London are granted a trade monopoly with the Netherlands by King Henry VII "in return for the payment of £5,000" to the royal coffers.
- May 23 – Girolamo Savonarola, ruler of Florence, is executed for criticizing the Pope.
- May 30 – Christopher Columbus sets out on his third voyage to the Western Hemisphere from Sanlúcar, Spain.
- May 27 – The formal coronation of King Louis XII in France takes place at the Reims Cathedral.
- May – In "early May", the John Cabot expedition departs from Bristol on a second expedition westward to find a sea route between England and Japan.
- June 10 – The Battle of Laaksum is fought in Friesland in the Netherlands at Stavoren and Warns, bringing an end to the civil war fought for almost a century between the Vetkopers and Schieringers. The Scheringers are triumphant after agreeing to allow Albert III, Duke of Saxony to annex Friesland in return for Albert's protection.
- June 20 – Niccolò Machiavelli, who will later be the author of the influential political theory guide The Prince, is elected by the Great Council of Florence as the Secretary of the Second Chancellery of the Republic of Florence.
- June 30 – The Wiener Hofmusikkapelle, a forerunner of the Vienna Boys' Choir, is founded by order of Maximilian I, Holy Roman Emperor, instructing officials of the imperial court at Vienna to employ a vocal teacher (singing master), two bass singers and six boys.

=== July–September ===
- July 31 – Columbus becomes the first European to visit the island of Trinidad.
- August 1 – Columbus discovers the mouth of the Orinoco at what is now Venezuela on the continent of South America, but does not enter.
- August 4 – Columbus begins eight days of exploring the Gulf of Paria between Trinidad and Venezuela.
- August 5 – Columbus lands on the Paria Peninsula, in what is now Venezuela in the first definitely recorded landing of Europeans on the mainland Americas.
- August 12 – Columbus concludes his exploration of Venezuela.
- September 20 – (Meiō 7, 2nd day of the 7th month) A massive earthquake, estimated centuries later as having been 8.6 magnitude occurs off of the coast of the Japanese region of Nankaidō at about 8:00 in the morning. The resulting tsunami kills at least 5,000 people (and perhaps as many as 41,000) when it strikes Kamakura and the surrounding area in what is now Japan's Kanagawa Prefecture. The tsunami washes away a building that houses the Kotoku-in Buddhist temple, but spares the large bronze statue of the Buddha Amitābha.

=== October–December ===
- October 28 – In the Chinese Empire, two days after being blamed by the Emperor Zhu Youcheng for bringing misfortunes to the Empire by having built a pavilion in the imperial gardens that disregarded feng shui principles, royal administrator Li Guang commits suicide. The Emperor's daughter Princess Taikang had died suddenly on October 1, and a fire had broken out in one of the palaces in Beijing's Forbidden City on October 26.
- October 31 – An-Nasir Muhammad ibn Qaitbay, Sultan of Egypt and Syria, is assassinated, and is succeeded by his uncle, the Vizier Abu Sa'id Qansuh.
- November 24 – In the Kingdom of the Catholic Monarchs of Spain, Diego de Deza, Bishop of Jaén, is commissioned as the Grand Inquisitor for the Crown of Castile, the Kingdom of León, and for Granada. His power is expanded in September to include the rest of Spain.
- November 26 – Pope Alexander VI orders the demolition of the historic Meta Romuli pyramid in Rome in order to clear the way for the building of the new road to the Tiber Bridge.
- December 17 – Eight months after ascending the throne, King Louis XII of France annuls his marriage to Jeanne de Valois after 22 years so that he can marry Anne, Duchess of Brittany. The King grants his former queen the title of the Duchess of Berry.

=== Date unknown ===
- During the summer, the final Welsh revolt of the medieval era breaks out in Meirionnydd, North Wales; Harlech Castle is captured by the rebels before the revolt is suppressed.
- João Fernandes Lavrador and Pedro de Barcelos journey to Greenland; during their voyage, they discover the land which they name Labrador.
- Gun barrel rifling is invented in Augsburg, Bavaria.

== Births ==
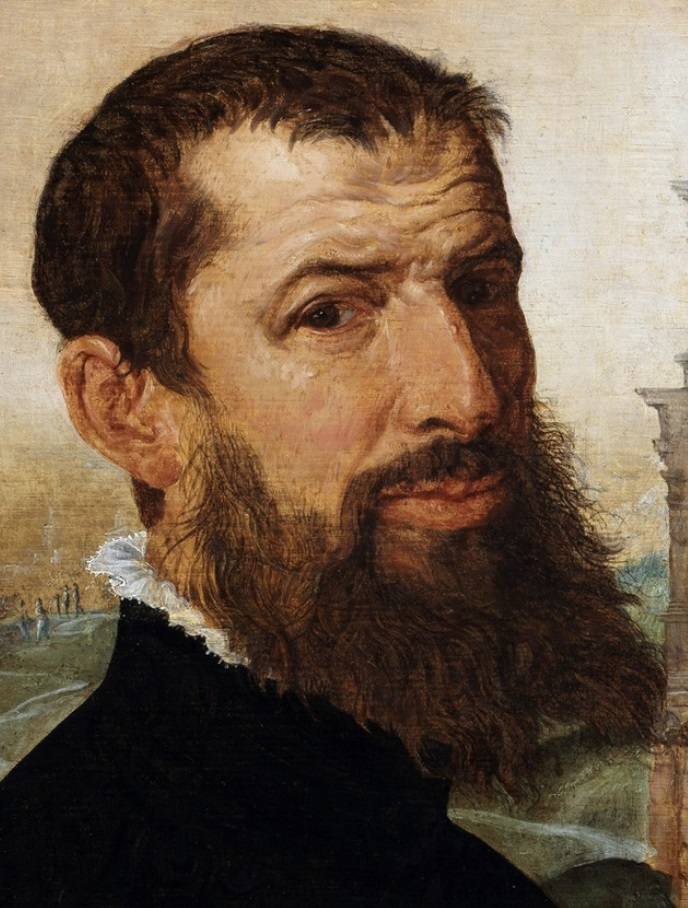
Maarten van Heemskerck born 1 June

- January 31 – Tiberio Crispo, Italian clergyman (d. 1566)
- February 4 – George I of Württemberg-Mömpelgard (d. 1558)
- February 21 – Ralph Neville, 4th Earl of Westmorland, English earl (d. 1549)
- February 25 – Francesco of Saluzzo, Marquess of Saluzzo (d. 1537)
- April 5 – Giovanni dalle Bande Nere, Italian condottiero (d. 1526)
- April 9 – Jean, Cardinal of Lorraine, French churchman (d. 1550)
- June 1 – Maarten van Heemskerck, Dutch painter (d. 1574)d
- June 30 – Wilhelm von Brandenburg, Archbishop of Riga (d. 1563)
- July 25 – Hernando de Aragón, Spanish Catholic archbishop (d. 1575)
- August 23 – Miguel da Paz, Prince of Portugal (d. 1500)
- August 24 – John, Hereditary Prince of Saxony, German prince (d. 1537)
- November 1 – Giovanni Ricci, Italian cardinal (d. 1574)
- November 15 – Eleanor of Austria, Queen of Portugal and France (d. 1558)
- December 1 – Giovanni Michele Saraceni, Italian Catholic cardinal (d. 1568)
- December 19 – Andreas Osiander, German Protestant theologian (d. 1552)
- date unknown
  - Giulio Clovio, (Juraj Julije Klovic) Dalmatian miniaturist and illustrator (d. 1578)
  - Anna of Masovia, Polish princess (d. 1557)
  - Meera, Rajput princess (d. 1547)
  - Sagara Taketō, Japanese retainer (d. 1551)
  - Pier Paolo Vergerio, Italian religious reformer (d. 1565)
  - Felix Manz, leader of the Swiss Anabaptists (d. 1527)

== Deaths ==
- February 4 – Antonio del Pollaiuolo, Italian painter (b. c. 1432)
- April 7 – King Charles VIII of France (b. 1470)
- May 23 – Girolamo Savonarola, Italian religious reformer and ruler of Florence (b. 1452; executed)
- June 7 – Anđeo Zvizdović, Bosnian Franciscan friar and evangelist (b. c. 1420)
- July 14 – Gentile Budrioli, Italian astrologer and herbalist
- August 17 – John Scrope, 5th Baron Scrope of Bolton, English baron (b. 1437)
- August 23 – Isabella of Aragon, Queen of Portugal, eldest daughter of Isabella I of Castile and Ferdinand II of Aragon (b. 1470)
- September 14 – Giovanni il Popolano, Italian diplomat (b. 1467)
- September 16 – Tomás de Torquemada, Spanish Dominican friar and first Grand Inquisitor (b. 1420)
- December 7 – Alexander Hegius von Heek, German humanist (b. c. 1443)
- December 19 – Jeanne de Laval, French noble (b. 1433)
- date unknown
  - Tun Perak, Malay general and statesman
  - Domenico Rosselli, Italian sculptor (b. c. 1439)
- probable – Johannes Martini, Flemish composer (b. c. 1440)
