= 1462 in Ireland =

- Centuries: 13th; 14th; 15th; 16th; 17th
- Decades: 1440s; 1450s; 1460s; 1470s; 1480s
- See also: Other events of 1462; List of years in Ireland

Events from the year 1462 in Ireland.

== Incumbent ==
- Lord: Edward IV

== Events ==
- Battle of Piltown: Desmond defeats Butlers.
- Glenquin Castle, is a tower house and National Monument located in County Limerick. Built by the Ó hAilgheanáin (O'Hallinans) in 1462, on the site of an older building dating back to AD 983.

== Deaths ==
- James FitzGerald, 6th Earl of Desmond
