= 1458 in Ireland =

- Centuries: 13th; 14th; 15th; 16th; 17th
- Decades: 1430s; 1440s; 1450s; 1460s; 1470s
- See also: Other events of 1458; List of years in Ireland

Events from the year 1458 in Ireland.

== Incumbent ==
- Lord: Henry VI

== Events ==
- Thomas Barrett appointed bishop of Annaghdown.
- Parliament of Ireland withdraws attaintment against John Cantwell II, Archbishop of Cashel, on grounds of ill-health.
- Rowland FitzEustace, 1st Baron Portlester marries Joan, widow of Christopher Lord Killeen
- Richard Nugent, Lord Delvin seizes land from his estranged son in law William Butler
- John Bole, Archbishop of Armagh hires Aodh son of Eoghan mac Néill Óg O'Neill as a protector

== Deaths ==
- Edmund na Féasóige de Búrca, 4th Mac William Íochtar
- Calbhach Ó Conchobhair Failghe (Calvach O'Connor Faly), chief of Uíbh Fhailghe

== Notes ==
- Fryde, E. B.; Greenway, D. E.; Porter, S.; Roy, I., eds. (1986). Handbook of British Chronology (3rd, reprinted 2003 ed.). Cambridge: Cambridge University Press. ISBN 0-521-56350-X.
- Moody, T. W.; Martin, F. X.; Byrne, F. J., eds. (1984). Maps, Genealogies, Lists: A Companion to Irish History, Part II. A New History of Ireland. Vol. IX. Oxford: Oxford University Press. ISBN 0-19-821745-5.
