= Jan Borukowski =

Polish bishop (1524–1584)

Jan Borukowski of Bielin (1524–1584) was the Bishop of Przemyśl and was the royal secretary of Poland from 1553. In 1569, he signed the act of annexation of Podlaskie, Volhynia and Kyiv to the kingdom during the Sejm in Lublin.
