= Guyonne de Laval =

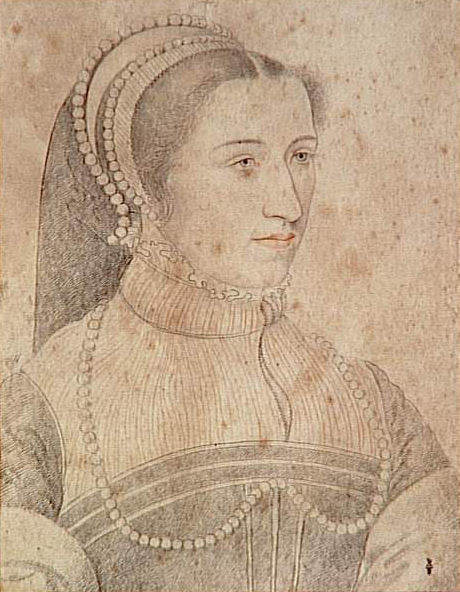
Guyonne de Laval, 1560

Guyonne de Laval née Renée de Rieux (1524–1567) was a French suo jure countess of Laval 1547–1567. She, along with Louis, Prince of Condé (1530–1569), Gaspard II de Coligny and François de Coligny d'Andelot are pointed out as one of the instigators of the famous Surprise of Meaux of 1567.

== Life ==
=== Early life ===
She was born to Claude I de Rieux (1497–1532), Sire de Rieux et de Rochefort, Comte d’Harcourt et d’Aumale, and Catherine de Laval (1504–1526). She served as lady-in-waiting to the queen of France, Eleanor of Austria, in 1533–1547. In 1540 she married Louis de Sainte-Maure.

=== Countess of Laval ===
In 1547, she inherited the title Count of Laval from her maternal grandfather Guy XVI de Laval. Because of her sex, she was forced to share the title and domain with her husband Louis de Sainte-Maure (jure uxoris). Because all the counts of Laval were named Guy, she and her spouse changed their names to Guyonne and Guy.

=== Divorce and the Huguenot Wars ===
She lived in an unhappy marriage. When her husband has her imprisoned, she escaped in 1557. Her husband was given a parliamentary decision that she should return to marriage. When she refused, her husband convinced the Pope to excommunicate her. As a response, Guyonne de Laval converted to Calvinism and became one a prominent Huguenot supporter during the French wars of religion.
