= Achilles Statius =

Portuguese humanist and writer

- Born: 12 June 1524; Vidigueira, Kingdom of Portugal
- Died: 17 September 1581 (aged 57); Rome, Papal States
- Resting place: Santa Maria in Vallicella
- Alma mater: University of Évora; University of Coimbra; Old University of Leuven; University of Paris
- Occupation: Translator, writer, philologist

Achilles Statius (or Aquiles Estaço) (12 June 1524, Vidigueira – 17 September 1581) was a Portuguese humanist and writer, since 1555 living in Rome, where he was a secretary of the pope. Achilles Statius is now mostly known from his extensive Latin commentary to Catullus, published in 1566.

== Works ==
- Estaço, Aquiles (1551). Achillis Statii Lusitani Commentarii in Librum Ciceronis de Fato (in Latin). Lovanii: ex officina Seruatij Sasseni.
- Estaço, Aquiles (1553). Achillis Statij... In Q. Horatij Flacci poeticam commentarij (in Latin). Antverpiae: apud Martinum Nutium.
- (Santo), Pachomius Santo (1575). S. Pachomii ... Regula e Syriaco Graecoq. in Latinum a B. Hieronymo conuersa. Item B. Anselmi de vita aeterna sermo. Vtrumq. numquam antea, nunc autem ab Achille Statio Lusitano primum editum (in Latin). Romae: apud haeredes Antonij Bladij impressores camerales.
- Beati Anastasi monachi. montis Sinai Oratio. de sacra. synaxi ac de eo, quod est, ne quem iudicemus, nec iniuriarium memores esse velimus. Achille Statio interprete (in Latin). Romae: apud heredes Antonij Bladij impressores camerales. 1579.
- Estaço, Aquiles (1580). Sancti patris nostri Iohannis archiepisc. Constantinopolitani cognomento Chrysostomi Homilia in Seraphim. Achille Statio Lusitano interprete (in Latin). Romae: apud haeredes Antonij Bladij Impressores Camerales.
- Estaço, Aquiles (1581). Achillis Statii Lusitani De redittib. ecclesiasticis qui beneficiis et pensionib. continentur. Commentarioli II (in Latin). Romae: apud heredes Antonij Bladij impressores camerales.
