= 1477 in Ireland =

- Centuries: 13th; 14th; 15th; 16th; 17th
- Decades: 1450s; 1460s; 1470s; 1480s; 1490s
- See also: Other events of 1477; List of years in Ireland

Events from the year 1477 in Ireland.

== Incumbent ==
- Lord: Edward IV

== Events ==
- Garret More, the Great Earl of Kildare starts his rule (ruled until his death in 1513).
- Christopher Columbus, a Genoese merchant, visits Galway on a trading voyage.

== Deaths ==
- Thomas FitzGerald, 7th Earl of Kildare
