= Treaty of Saint-Trond =

1465 treaty between Burgundy and Liège

The Treaty of Saint-Trond, concluded 22 December 1465, was a treaty between Philip the Good, ruler of the Burgundian Netherlands, and the prince-bishopric of Liège. It brought to an end the war between Burgundy and Liège that had begun in August 1465.

Victory in the Battle of Montenaken (20 October 1465) had placed the Burgundians in a position of strength, which was reflected in the terms of the treaty. Liège was to have no freedom to make international alliances without Burgundian approval, to pay a heavy indemnity for Burgundian war expenses, and to appoint Philip's son and heir apparent, Charles the Bold, as hereditary sovereign guardian of the churches and the city of Liège, the towns and land of Liège and Loon.

Chafing under Burgundian control, it was not long before Liège again took up arms.

== See also ==
- Wars of Liège
