= La Dauphine =

Sailing vessel and flagship of Giovanni da Verrazzano's first voyage to North America

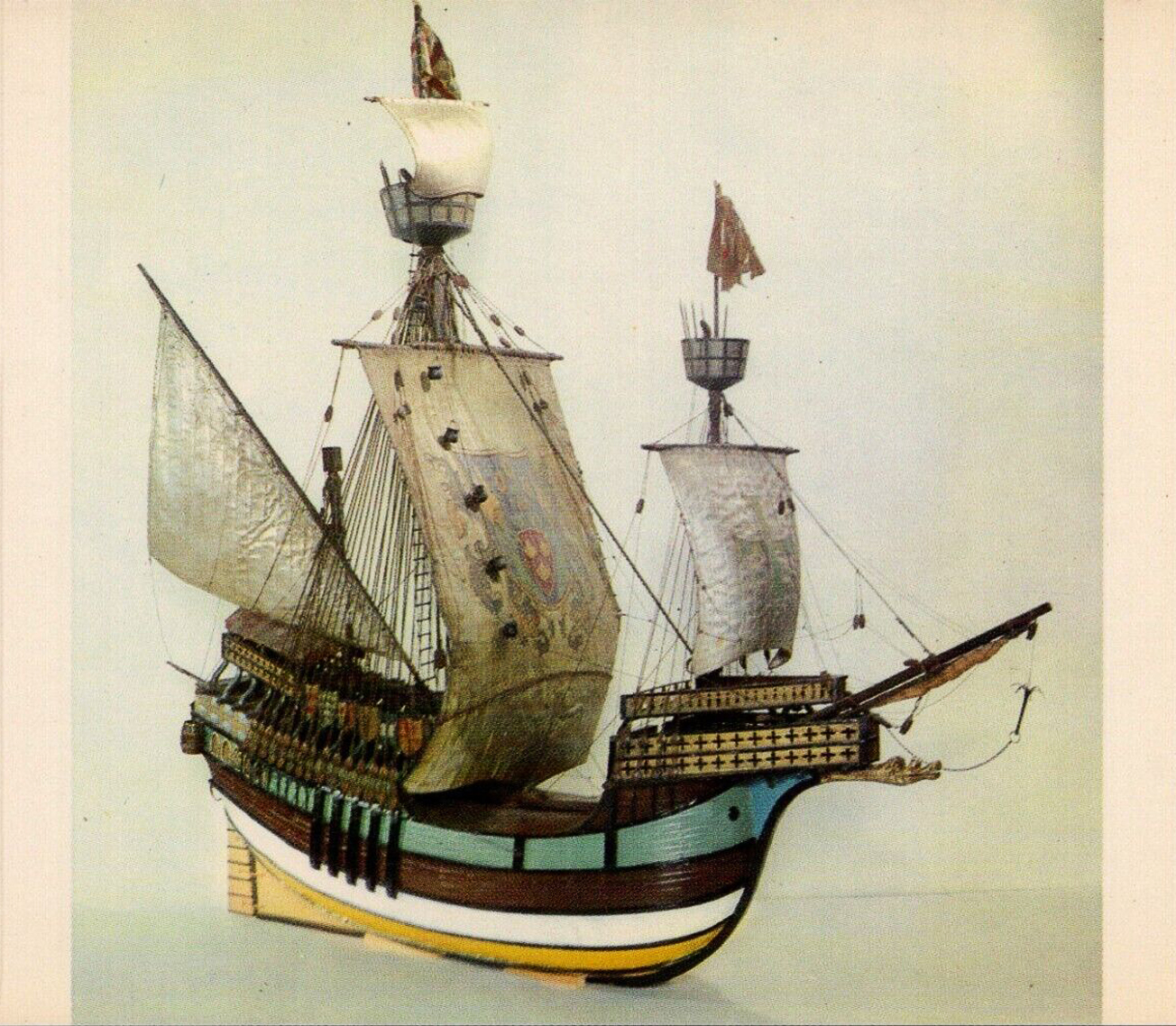
- La Dauphine (model)

History

France
- Name: La Dauphine
- Builder: Royal Dockyard, Le Havre
- Laid down: 1518
- Fate: unknown
- Notes: 1523–24 voyage to explore the East coast of North America

General characteristics
- Class & type: Carrack
- Tons burthen: ~ 100 t
- Propulsion: Sail
- Complement: ~ 50

La Dauphine (Fr. "The [feminine] Dolphin", term used for the wife of the crown prince) was a three-masted sailing vessel that served as the flagship of the explorer Giovanni da Verrazzano on his first voyage to the New World while seeking a shipping passage to China from Europe.

== Construction ==
The ship was built in 1518 at the Royal Dockyard of Le Havre, Normandy and displayed the typical shape of a Norman nef (carrack). She had a tonnage of about 100. The vessel could hold approximately fifty people. It was named for the Dauphin of France, Francis III, Duke of Brittany, the heir to the French throne who was born in 1518 to Claude of France, daughter of Louis XII of France, and King Francis I of France.

== Operational history ==
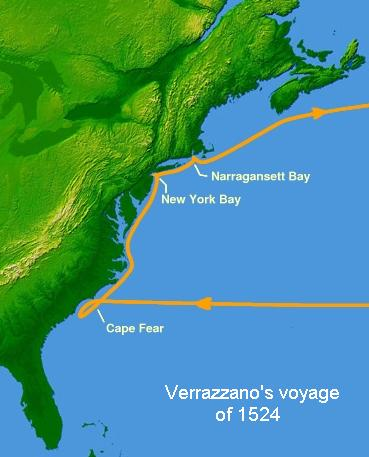

The French king, Francis I, placed Verrazzano in charge of an expedition to find a new shipping passage westward to China, the elusive "Northwest Passage". The expedition started with four ships in 1523 from Normandy, La Dauphine being the flagship. Soon after departure the convoy encountered a storm and sought refuge in Brittany. With two ships damaged, only two ships continued; however, La Normande soon returned also, after some privateering, and La Dauphine continued alone to Madeira for the winter.

With supplies for an eight-month voyage, Verrazzano left Madeira on 24 January 1524. La Dauphine was piloted by Antoine de Conflans and Verrazzano's brother, Girolamo, the only other person aboard whose name is known, served as navigator and cartographer.

Verrazzano arrived at the American continent off Cape Fear in early March, briefly sailed south, and then turned north sailing along the Atlantic shore. Pamlico Sound was entered and Verrazzano's exaggerated description of it gave birth to the concept of Verrazzano's Sea as a cartographic error for the next century. Verrazano's Sea was declared as a sea connection to the west across the continent.

Going farther north La Dauphine sailed too far offshore to encounter Chesapeake Bay and Delaware Bay, but then entered and anchored in New York Bay on 17 April 1524. Verrazzano named the harbor Angoulême after a dukedom that belonged to the king. Thereafter La Dauphine sailed farther north, passed Long Island and Block Island, and anchored in Narragansett Bay for two weeks. The vessel then continued and reached the Penobscot River in Maine, apparently missed entering the Bay of Fundy, passed Nova Scotia, and arrived at the already known Newfoundland. La Dauphine returned to Dieppe, France, arriving on 8 July 1524.

== Reconstruction ==
A specific plan of the original La Dauphine does not exist. A reconstruction model that has been on display at Dieppe, is considered imperfect. The Maritime Museum of Rouen has been working on a project to create a full-size replica of her. Currently a 1/50 model of La Dauphine has been created, and building plans are being developed, based on best evidence of contemporary documents and similar types of ships of the period.

It is intended that a reconstructed La Dauphine will cross the Atlantic to arrive at New York Harbor, possibly in time for the five hundredth anniversary of the European discovery of the harbor by Verrazzano on 17 April 2024. During the reconstruction the building site at the museum will be accessible to tourists.

== Notes ==
La Dauphine has a later namesake in an eighteenth-century warship of the French Navy.
