= 1467 in Ireland =

- Centuries: 13th; 14th; 15th; 16th; 17th
- Decades: 1440s; 1450s; 1460s; 1470s; 1480s
- See also: Other events of 1467; List of years in Ireland

Events from the year 1467 in Ireland.

== Incumbent ==
- Lord: Edward IV

== Events ==
- The Lord Deputy is granted Lambay Island by statute to build a fortress for England's protection against the Spaniards, French and Scots.
- Events of this year are recorded in A Fragment of Irish Annals. The text is believed to date from the years 1467-68 or immediately after and covers only these two years.
