= Battle of Montenaken =

Battle of the First Liège War in 1465

- Part of the First Liège War
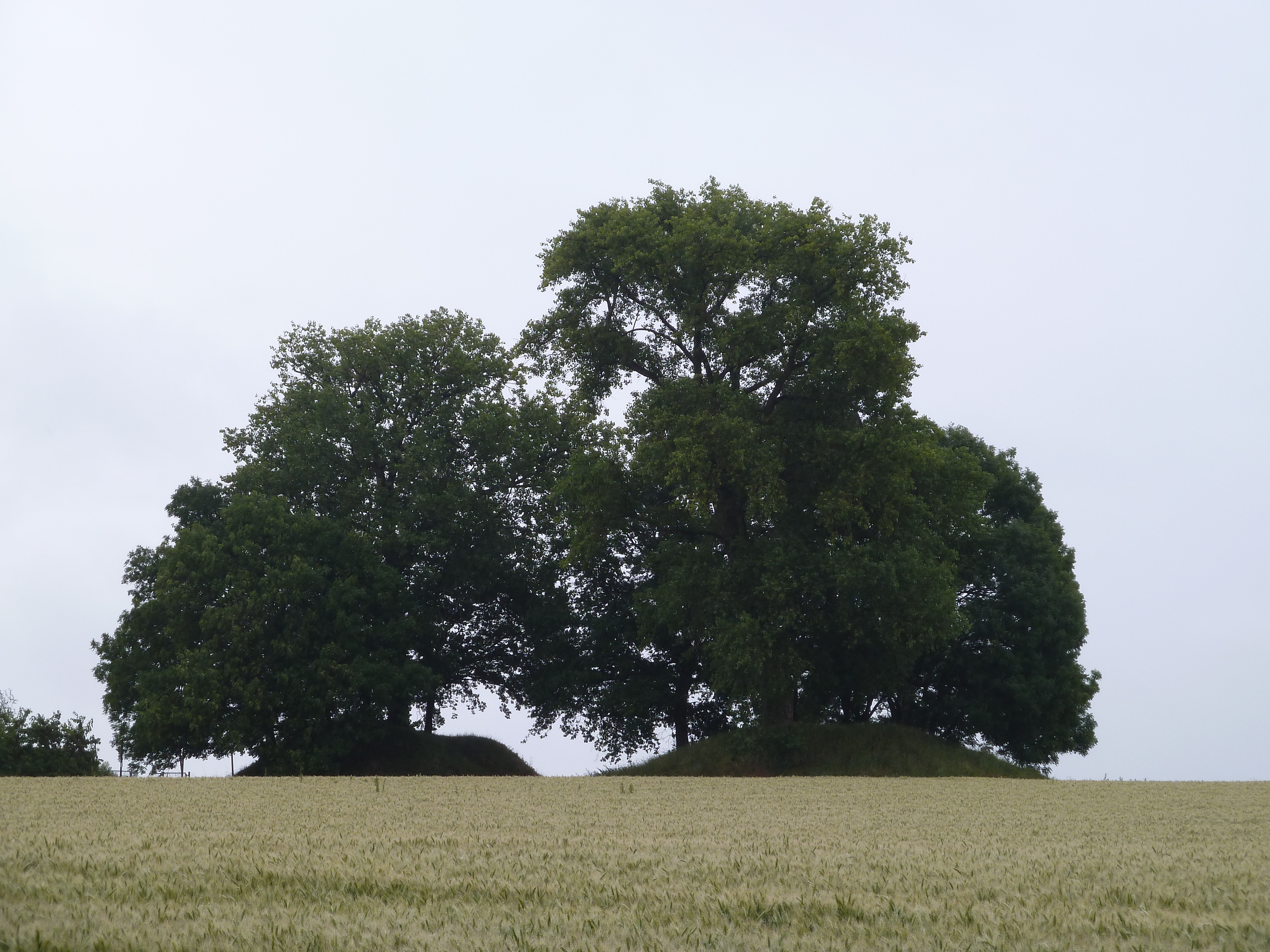
- Tumuli near Montenaken, 50°42′35.23″N 5°9′30.07″E.
Date	October 20, 1465
Location	Montenaken, near Sint-Truiden (present-day Belgium)
Result	Burgundian victory

Belligerents
Burgundian State	Prince-Bishopric of Liège

Commanders and leaders
Philip the Good	Raes van Heers

Strength
1,800	2,000–3,000

Casualties and losses
Low	1,200

The Battle of Montenaken was fought between the forces of Liège and the Burgundian State on 20 October 1465 as part of the First Liège War. Although outnumbered, the Burgundian force succeeded in routing the militia of Liège, inflicting heavy casualties.

== Background ==
The War of the Public Weal between Louis XI and many of his senior nobles began in March 1465. As a consequence, the Burgundian State found itself at war with France. Louis, anxious to find allies, entered into talks with the city of Liège, which had historical grievances with Burgundy, leading to a military treaty in June 1465. With the major part of the Burgundian army, under Charles, Count of Charolais, engaged in France, the Liègois declared war on Burgundy on 28 August. Despite having most of his forces committed in France, the elderly Philip the Good, Duke of Burgundy, rapidly assembled a force to defend his possessions against the attack of Liège.

== Armies ==
The Liegois army, commanded by Raes de Lyntre, Lord of Heers was approximately 2,000 to 3,000 strong, mostly infantry with some field artillery. The Burgundian force was about 1,800 strong, mostly cavalry, not all of whom took part in the battle.

The Burgundian cavalry, led by an unidentified commander (though possibly Antoine de Bourgogne), consisted primarily of heavy knights and men-at-arms. Their force, while smaller, possessed significant tactical mobility and shock value, though contemporary accounts suggest a portion of the cavalry was held in reserve or failed to engage fully, potentially due to the constricting terrain near the village of Montenaken. The Liegois infantry, drawn from guild militias and city levies, was arrayed in a defensive formation, likely incorporating the artillery to disrupt any cavalry charge. The ensuing engagement exemplified the ongoing medieval struggle between the massed pike and projectile of urban infantry and the mounted elite of feudal aristocracy, with the outcome at Montenaken demonstrating the vulnerabilities of cavalry when operating without sufficient supporting infantry which told the outcome.

== Battle ==
The Burgundian army, having confronted the Liège forces at Montenaken found themselves too weak to assault the defences. They therefore sent out raiders to burn the countryside in the hope of provoking the Liege troops to confront them. This was successful and a large Liege force, perhaps their whole army, met with a force of 300 to 500 Burgundian cavalry in open country. The Liege forces drew up between two tumuli, of which there are a number around Montenaken. The Burgundian cavalry charged but were beaten back by artillery fire. Regrouping, they charged again and were again beaten back. This time, however, their opponents pursued them. The Burgundians rallied again and charged a third time. The Liège army, out of its defensive position and disordered by pursuit was routed. An estimated 1,200 men were killed in the battle and pursuit.

== Aftermath ==
On 21 October, Louis XI wrote to Liège, informing the city he had made an independent peace with the Burgundians (the Treaty of Conflans), and advising them to do likewise before the main Burgundian army returned. This they did, signing the Treaty of Saint-Trond in December.
