= 1478 in Ireland =

- Centuries: 13th; 14th; 15th; 16th; 17th
- Decades: 1450s; 1460s; 1470s; 1480s; 1490s
- See also: Other events of 1478; List of years in Ireland

Events from the year 1478 in Ireland.

== Incumbent ==
- Lord: Edward IV

== Deaths ==
- 18 February – George Plantagenet, 1st Duke of Clarence, third son of Richard Plantagenet, 3rd Duke of York (born 1449).
- John Butler, 6th Earl of Ormonde.
