= 1476 in Ireland =

- Centuries: 13th; 14th; 15th; 16th; 17th
- Decades: 1450s; 1460s; 1470s; 1480s; 1490s
- See also: Other events of 1476; List of years in Ireland

Events from the year 1476 in Ireland.

== Incumbent ==
- Lord: Edward IV

== Births ==
- John Alen, English-born canon lawyer, Archbishop of Dublin (d. 1534).

== Deaths ==
- Brian Ó hUiginn, poet.
