= 1468 in Ireland =

- Centuries: 13th; 14th; 15th; 16th; 17th
- Decades: 1440s; 1450s; 1460s; 1470s; 1480s
- See also: Other events of 1468; List of years in Ireland

Events from the year 1468 in Ireland.

== Incumbent ==
- Lord: Edward IV

== Events ==
- Events of this year are recorded in A Fragment of Irish Annals. The text is believed to date from the years 1467-68 or immediately after and covers only these two years.

== Deaths ==
- Thomas FitzGerald, 7th Earl of Desmond, died by execution.
- Torna Ó Maolconaire, Ollamh Síol Muireadaigh
