= 1474 in Ireland =

- Centuries: 13th; 14th; 15th; 16th; 17th
- Decades: 1450s; 1460s; 1470s; 1480s; 1490s
- See also: Other events of 1474; List of years in Ireland

Events from the year 1474 in Ireland.

== Incumbent ==
- Lord: Edward IV

== Events ==
- Gilbert Debenham appointed Lord Chancellor of Ireland

== Deaths ==
- Tomás Ó Cobhthaigh, a poet.
