= 1465 =

1465 in various calendars
- Gregorian calendar: 1465; MCDLXV
- Ab urbe condita: 2218
- Armenian calendar: 914; ԹՎ ՋԺԴ
- Assyrian calendar: 6215
- Balinese saka calendar: 1386–1387
- Bengali calendar: 871–872
- Berber calendar: 2415
- English Regnal year: 4 Edw. 4 – 5 Edw. 4
- Buddhist calendar: 2009
- Burmese calendar: 827
- Byzantine calendar: 6973–6974
- Chinese calendar: 甲申年 (Wood Monkey); 4162 or 3955 — to — 乙酉年 (Wood Rooster); 4163 or 3956
- Coptic calendar: 1181–1182
- Discordian calendar: 2631
- Ethiopian calendar: 1457–1458
- Hebrew calendar: 5225–5226
- Hindu calendars
- Vikram Samvat: 1521–1522
- Shaka Samvat: 1386–1387
- Kali Yuga: 4565–4566
- Holocene calendar: 11465
- Igbo calendar: 465–466
- Iranian calendar: 843–844
- Islamic calendar: 869–870
- Japanese calendar: Kanshō 6 (寛正６年)
- Javanese calendar: 1381–1382
- Julian calendar: 1465; MCDLXV
- Korean calendar: 3798
- Minguo calendar: 447 before ROC 民前447年
- Nanakshahi calendar: −3
- Thai solar calendar: 2007–2008
- Tibetan calendar: ཤིང་ཕོ་སྤྲེ་ལོ་ (male Wood-Monkey); 1591 or 1210 or 438 — to — ཤིང་མོ་བྱ་ལོ་ (female Wood-Bird); 1592 or 1211 or 439

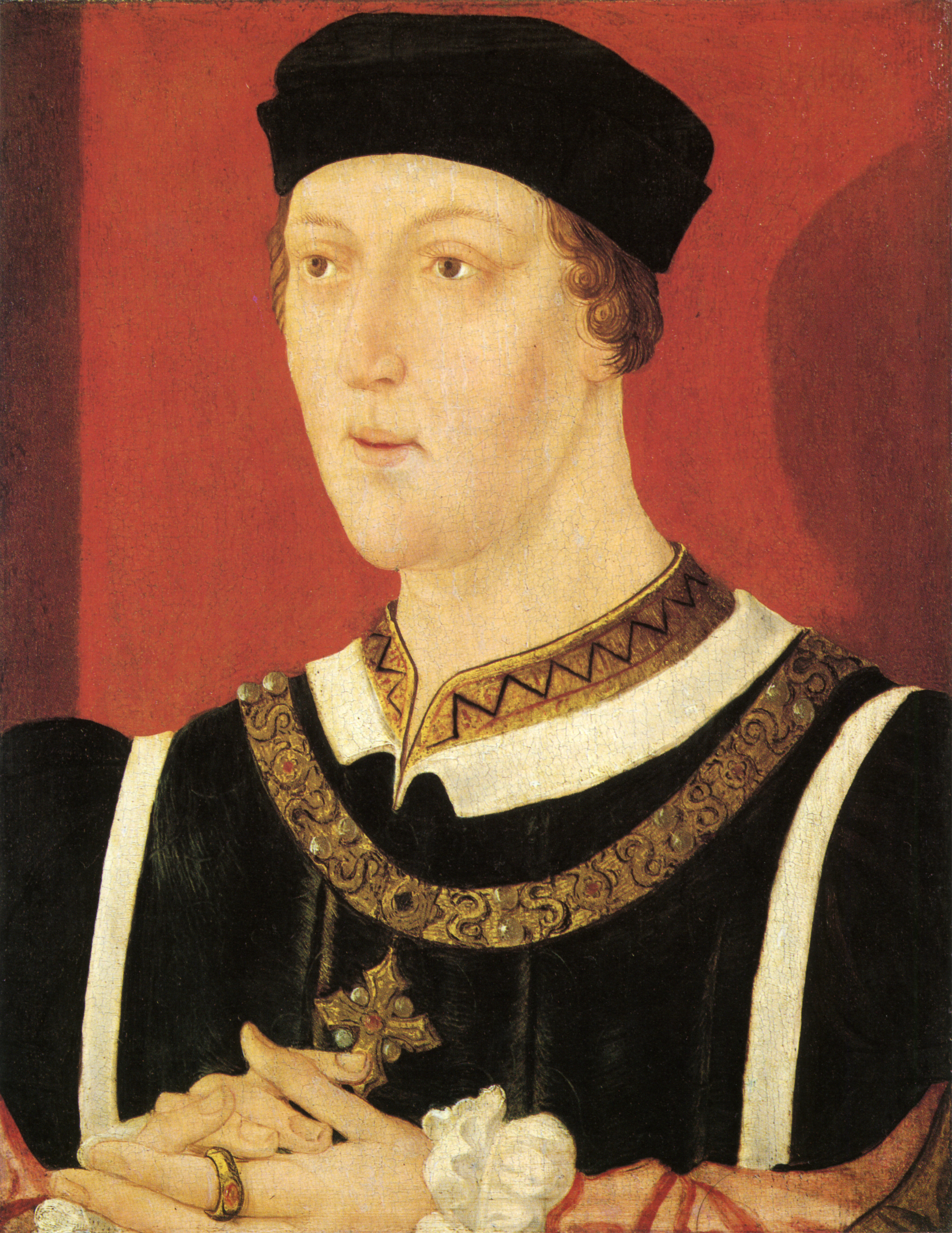
July 13: The former King Henry VI of England is captured as a fugitive and put in prison by King Edward IV.

Year 1465 (MCDLXV) was a common year starting on Tuesday of the Julian calendar.

== Events ==
=== January–March ===
- January 24 – Chilia is conquered by Stephen the Great of Moldavia, following a second siege.
- January 29 – Amadeus IX becomes Duke of Savoy.
- January 30 – Charles VIII of Sweden is deposed. Clergyman Kettil Karlsson Vasa becomes Regent of Sweden.
- February 28 – In the Catalan Civil War, the Battle of Calaf is fought and Pedro V, the self-proclaimed King of Aragon, is defeated near Barcelona by the legitimate King, Juan II.
- March 25 – Queens' College, Cambridge, dormant since 1447, is re-established on the campus of the University of Cambridge by the queen consort of England, Elizabeth Woodville, with the official name of "the College of St. Margaret and St. Bernard in the University of Cambridge."
- March 28 – King Edward IV gives royal assent to acts passed by the English Parliament, including the Pattens Act 1464, regulating the manufacture of pattens, shoes with wooden soles and heels, and leather covering, declaring that "Patten-makers may make pattens of such asp as is not fit for shafts." The law is among several given royal assent to regulate clothing, including the Cloths Act, the Exportation of Wool Act and Contracting for Wool Act and the Shoemakers Act. The parliament, in session since April 29, 1463, closes.

=== April–June ===
- April 27 – Nobility in the Castilian city of Plasencia declare that they will consider King Enrique IV deposed, four months after the Liga Nobiliaria had issued an ultimatum to the King.
- May 14 – The Moroccan Revolt in Fez ousts the Marinid rulers, and leads to the killing of many Jews.
- May 26 – Elizabeth Woodville, Queen consort of Edward IV of England, is crowned in a lavish ceremony at Westminster Abbey.
- June 5 – The Farce of Ávila takes place in the Kingdom of Castile in Spain as noblemen in Ávila declare that King Enrique IV is deposed and that they will only recognize his half-brother, Alfonso, Prince of Asturias, as their monarch. King Enrique, who was the subject of a similar deposition in Plasencia on April 27, continues his reign of the rest of the kingdom from Madrid.

=== July–September ===
- July 13 – Henry of Lancaster, the former King Henry VI of England is captured at Waddington Hall in Lancashire, by Yorkist forces. Henry and his aide, Sir Richard Tunstall, had been staying as the guest of Sir Richard Tempest when his brother. Richard's brother, John Tempest attempts to arrest Henry, but Tunstall and Henry flee to the Clitheroe forest and are captured by the River Ribble.
- July 16 – At the Battle of Montlhéry, troops of King Louis XI fight inconclusively against an army of great nobles, organized as the League of the Public Weal.
- July 24 – Henry of Lancaster, the former King Henry VI of England, is imprisoned in the Tower of London by order of King Edward IV. His queen consort Margaret of Anjou and Edward of Westminster, Prince of Wales, have fled to France.
- August 11 – In Sweden, Kettil Karlsson Vasa, Bishop of Linköping, is succeeded as Regent by Archbishop Jöns Bengtsson Oxenstierna.
- September 7 – With the approval by the Holy Roman Emperor Friedrich III, the Bohemian captain Hinko Tannfeld to plunder the Hungarian town of Sopron.
- September 23 – Pope Matthew II of Alexandria, leader of the Coptic Christian Church, dies after a reign of 13 years. The Coptic papacy will remain vacant for five months until the election of Gabriel VI as the new Pope.
- September 29 – King Ferrante of Naples creates the award Order of the Ermine (L’Ordre de l’Hermine)
- September 30 – In what is now the state of Rajasthan in northwest India, Prince Rao Bika departs from Jodhpur with 600 soldiers to conquer the territory of Jangladesh.

=== October–December ===
- October 5 – The Treaty of Conflans is signed between King Louis XI of France and the Count of Charolais.
- October 20 – Near Sint-Truiden in what is now Belgium, Charles the Bold, son of the Duke of Burgundy leads his troops to victory over the rebellious province of Liege at the Battle of Montenaken, and 1,200 of the rebels are killed.
- October 29 – The treaty of Saint-Maur is signed between King Louis XI of France and the nobles of the League of the Public Weal (Ligue du bien public), ending the War of the Public Weal.
- November 13 – The Archbishop of Tours, Jean Bernard, excommunicates Bishop Jean de Beauvau of Angers for insubordination.
- November 26 – In Bohemia, Count Jaroslav Lev of Rožmitál departs from Prague along with 40 other Bohemian lords as part of King George's project of Establishment of Peace throughout Christendom.
- December 22 – The Treaty of Saint-Trond is signed to end the war between the Burgundian Netherlands (ruled by Philip the Good) and the Prince-Bishopric of Liège, ending the First Liège War, which had started four months earlier. Liège is allowed to keep its sovereignty at the cost of paying for the Burgundian war expenses and designating Charles the Bold, son of the Duke Philip, as heir to the rule of the area.
- December 23 – The Treaty of Caen is signed between King Louis XI of France and Francis II, Duke of Brittany.

=== Date unknown ===
- Massive flooding in central and southern China motivates the initial construction of hundreds of new bridges.
- The main altar of St Martin's Church, Colmar is finished by painter Caspar Isenmann.
- The Kazakh Khanate is founded by Kerei Khan and Janibek Khan.

== Births ==
- January 1 – Lachlan Cattanach Maclean, 11th Chief, Scottish clan chief (d. 1523)
- February 4 – Frans van Brederode, Dutch rebel (d. 1490)
- February 6 – Scipione del Ferro, Italian mathematician (d. 1526)
- March 16 – Kunigunde of Austria, Archduchess of Austria (d. 1520)
- June 10 – Mercurino di Gattinara, Italian statesman and jurist (d. 1530)
- June 24 – Isabella del Balzo, queen consort of Naples (d. 1533)
- July 29 – Ichijō Fuyuyoshi, Japanese court noble (d. 1514)
- August 17 – Philibert I of Savoy (d. 1482)
- September 11 – Bernardo Accolti, Italian poet (d. 1536)
- October 14 – Konrad Peutinger, German humanist and antiquarian (d. 1547)
- December 11 – Ashikaga Yoshihisa, Japanese shōgun (d. 1489)
- date unknown
  - Şehzade Ahmet, oldest son of Sultan Bayezid II (d. 1513)
  - Hector Boece, Scottish historian (d. 1536)
  - William Cornysh, English composer (d. 1523)
  - George Neville, Duke of Bedford, English nobleman (d. 1483)
  - Diego Velázquez de Cuéllar, Spanish conquistador (d. 1524)
- probable
  - Gil Vicente, Portuguese poet and playwright
  - Francisco Álvares, Portuguese missionary and explorer (d. 1541))
  - Mette Dyre, Danish noblewoman, nominal sheriff and chancellor
  - Johann Tetzel, German Dominican priest (d. 1519)

== Deaths ==
- January 5 – Charles I, Duke of Orléans, French poet (b. 1394)
- January 14 – Thomas Beckington, English statesman and prelate
- January 29 – Louis, Duke of Savoy (b. 1413)
- March 30 – Isabella of Clermont, queen consort of Naples (b. c. 1424)
- April 30 – Jacob of Juterbogk, German theologian (b. c. 1381)
- May 12 – Thomas Palaiologos, claimant to Byzantine throne (b. 1409)
- August 11 – Kettil Karlsson, regent of Sweden and Bishop of Linköping (plague; b. 1433)
- August 14 – Abd al-Haqq II, last Marinid Sultan of Morocco (b.1419)
- September 25 – Isabella of Bourbon, countess consort of Charolais, spouse of Charles the Bold (b. c. 1434)
- November 20 – Malatesta Novello, Italian condottiero (b. 1418)
- date unknown – John Hardyng, English chronicler (b. 1378)
