= 1466 =

1466 in various calendars
Gregorian calendar	1466; MCDLXVI
Ab urbe condita	2219
Armenian calendar	915; ԹՎ ՋԺԵ
Assyrian calendar	6216
Balinese saka calendar	1387–1388
Bengali calendar	872–873
Berber calendar	2416
English Regnal year	5 Edw. 4 – 6 Edw. 4
Buddhist calendar	2010
Burmese calendar	828
Byzantine calendar	6974–6975
Chinese calendar	乙酉年 (Wood Rooster); 4163 or 3956 — to — 丙戌年 (Fire Dog); 4164 or 3957
Coptic calendar	1182–1183
Discordian calendar	2632
Ethiopian calendar	1458–1459
Hebrew calendar	5226–5227
- Hindu calendars
Vikram Samvat	1522–1523
Shaka Samvat	1387–1388
Kali Yuga	4566–4567
Holocene calendar	11466
Igbo calendar	466–467
Iranian calendar	844–845
Islamic calendar	870–871
Japanese calendar	Kanshō 7 / Bunshō 1 (文正元年)
Javanese calendar	1382–1383
Julian calendar	1466; MCDLXVI
Korean calendar	3799
Minguo calendar	446 before ROC 民前446年
Nanakshahi calendar	−2
Thai solar calendar	2008–2009
Tibetan calendar	ཤིང་མོ་བྱ་ལོ་ (female Wood-Bird); 1592 or 1211 or 439 — to — མེ་ཕོ་ཁྱི་ལོ་ (male Fire-Dog); 1593 or 1212 or 440

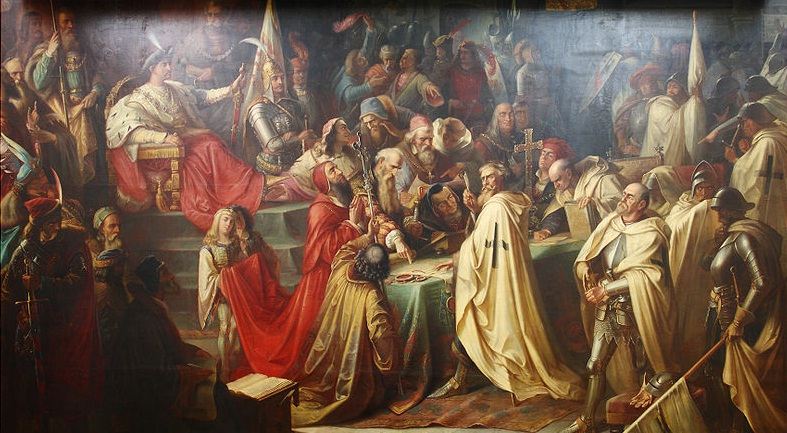
October 19: The Peace of Torun ends the Thirteen Years' War.

Year 1466 (MCDLXVI) was a common year starting on Wednesday of the Julian calendar.

== Events ==
=== January–March ===
- January 1 – King Edward IV of England gives royal assent to a 40-year extension to the 1464 Treaty of York between England and Scotland. The treaty, signed on June 1, 1464, was originally set for 15 years, to expire June 30, 1479. With the extension, approved by Scotland as well, peace between the two nations in Britain is extended to last until October 31, 1519.
- January 21 – The War of the Succession of Stettin is halted as the Treaty of Soldin is signed by Frederick II, Elector of Brandenburg, and two of the dukes of Pomerania, the brothers Erich II, Duke of Wolgast, and Wartislaw X, Duke of Rügen. The signing takes place at the town of Soldin in the Electorate of Brandenburg, now the city of Myślibórz in Poland. The brothers recognize Frederick II as their liege lord, and Brandenburg recognizes their rights to their fiefdoms.
- February 9 – Gabriel VI is elected as the new Pope of the Coptic Christian Church, succeeding the late Matthew II.
- March 8 – Galeazzo Maria Sforza becomes the new Duke of Milan upon the death of his father Francesco I Sforza, though at the time he is in France in a military expedition to help King Louis XI fight the Duke of Burgundy.
- March 20 – Galezzo Sforza enters Milan after working his way across the Duchy of Savoy, where he is in danger of being captured.

=== April–June ===
- April 19 – News reaches the Republic of Venice that the Ottoman Sultan is marching toward Italy with an army of 100,000 men.
- May 16 – Jahan Shah, Sultan of the Empire of Qara Qoyunlu that comprises most of what is now Iran, and parts of Azerbaijan, Armenia, Turkey and Iraq, begins an attempt to reclaim imperial territories from his younger brother, Uzun Hasan, and sets off from Tabriz with a large army.
- May 21 – On his deathbed, Bosnian nobleman Stjepan Vukčić Kosača, Grand Duke of Bosnia, dictates a testament proclaiming that his son Vladislav Hercegović, "brought the great Turk to Bosnia to the death and destruction of us all" and blames Vladislav for the end of the Kingdom of Bosnia. Vladislav becomes the Grand Duke of Bosnia the next day with the approval of the Ottoman governor.
- June 13 – Sin Sukchu resigns as Chief State Councillor (Yonguijong) of the Korean Empire, an office equivalent to prime minister, and is succeeded by Ku Ch'igwan.
- June 17 – Mülhausen, a free city within the Holy Roman Empire, joins the Swiss Confederacy in an alliance against the Habsburg dynasty including the Emperor Frederick III.

=== July–September ===
- July 9 – King James III of Scotland is taken hostage while he is hunting near his palace at Linlithgow, in a coup d'etat led by Lord Robert Boyd.
- July 12 – In the fourth year of the Ottoman–Venetian War, Admiral Vettore Cappello of the Republic of Venice Navy lands on the Greek mainland at Piraeus and the Venetians begin marching toward Athens to free it from Ottoman control.
- August 19 – With troops led by Charles the Bold, the Burgundian State commences a siege of the city of Dinant (now in Belgium). The city falls after six days on August 25.
- August 21 – Eric II, Duke of Pomerania, reconciles with King Casimir IV of Poland after six years of feuding.
- August 26 – In the Republic of Florence, an attempted coup d'etat against Piero di Cosimo de' Medici fails after his son Lorenzo discovers a roadblock that had been set by the conspirators to capture Medici during his planned trip to the Medici estate at Villa di Careggi.
- August 30 – A group of 41 Bavarian knights from the Straubing region gather at Regensburg and form an alliance against the Duke of Bavaria Munich, Albrecht IV. They refer to themselves as The Boeckler League" (Der Böcklerbundbund), led by Hans von Degenberg, and soon start a rebellion, the "Boeckler War". The League is dissolved by Imperial Decree from the Holy Roman Emperor Frederick III on October 28, 1467, and the League members vote for dissolution, but some continue the war.
- September 23 – Peace talks begin in the city of Nieszawka in Poland to end the Thirteen Years' War between the Kingdom of Poland and the Teutonic Knights.

=== October–December ===
- October 9 – King James III of Scotland gives royal assent Among the many acts passed into law by the Parliament, including the Hospitals Act ("for the reformacioune of the hospitalis") and the Benefices Act against Englishmen being allowed to receive a benefice (payment of a reward for services rendered) from the Crown or from the Church ("na Inglis man have benefice with Scotlande")
- October 11 – Eric of Pomerania buys the town of Lauenburg back from the Kingdom of Poland, seven years after it had been captured.
- October 13 – King James III of Scotland is forced by Lord Boyd to appear before the Scottish Parliament and to forgive Boyd and the other conspirators in the kidnapping that took place on July 9.
- October 19 – The Second Peace of Thorn is signed between King Casimir IV Jagiellon of Poland and the Teutonic Knights Grand Master, Ludwig von Erlichshausen, ending the Thirteen Years' War.
- November 22 – A messenger from the Venetian front in the war in Albania against the Ottomans brings news of planned attacks by the Ottoman General Sinan Bey against the Republic of Venice's Albanian territory, and an offer received from the Ottomans to negotiate a ceasefire or treaty.
- November 26 – Han Myŏnghoe becomes the new Chief State Councillor (Yonguijong) of the Korea, succeeding Ku Ch'igwan, who served for less than six months.
- December 12 – The Albanian General Skanderbeg arrives in Rome to offer his aid to the Christian League in the defense of Italy against the Ottoman Empire.
- December 23 – Pope Paul II excommunicates the King of Bohemia, George of Poděbrady, releasing all Bohemian citizens from their oaths of to the king.

== Date unknown ==
- The Kingdom of Georgia collapses into anarchy, and fragments into rival states of Kartli, Kakheti, Imereti, Samtskhe-Saatabago and a number of principalities; this breakup is finalised in 1490, when Constantine II of Georgia has to recognize his rival monarchies.
- Mark II of Constantinople, the Ecumenical Patriarch and leader of the Eastern Orthodox Christian church, is deposed in autumn after Symeon of Trebizond, a monk in the church, purchases the office of Ecumenical Patriarch for 2,000 gold pieces, with the help of his supporters in the Trapezuntine nobility. Soon after being appointed, Symeon is deposed by the Sultan and replaced with Dionysius of Dimitsana as the new Patriarch.
- The Mentelin Bible, the first printed German language Bible, is produced.
- Louis XI introduces silk weaving to Lyon.
- The first known shop specialising in eyeglasses opens in Strasbourg.
- The second largest bell of Saint Peter's Church, Fritzlar, in Hesse, is cast by Meister Goswin aus Fritzlar.

== Births ==
- February 11 – Elizabeth of York, queen of Henry VII of England (d. 1503)
- May – Elisabeth of Hesse-Marburg, German landgravine (d. 1523)
- May 22 – Marino Sanuto the Younger, Italian historian (d. 1536)
- June 18 – Ottaviano Petrucci, Italian music printer (d. 1539)
- July 5 – Giovanni Sforza, Italian noble (d. 1510)
- August 10 – Francesco II Gonzaga, Marquess of Mantua (d. 1519)
- September 9 – Ashikaga Yoshitane, Japanese shōgun (d. 1523)
- October 28 – Erasmus, Dutch philosopher (d. 1536)
- November 16 – Francesco Cattani da Diacceto, Florentine philosopher (d. 1522)
- November 26 – Edward Hastings, 2nd Baron Hastings, English noble (d. 1506)
- November 30 – Andrea Doria, Genoese condottiero and admiral (d. 1560)
- Probable – Moctezuma II, Aztec Tlatoani (ruler) of Tenochtitlán (modern Mexico City), 1502–1520, son of Axayacatl (d. 1520)

== Deaths ==
- February 23 – Girishawardhana Dyah Suryawikrama, 9th Maharaja of Majapahit
- March 6 – Alvise Loredan, Venetian admiral and statesman (b. 1393)
- March 8 – Francesco I Sforza, Duke of Milan (b. 1401)
- August – Hacı I Giray, first ruler of the Crimean Khanate (b. 1397)
- October 30 – Johann Fust, German printer (b. c. 1400)
- December 13 – Donatello, Italian artist (b. 1386)
- Date unknown
  - Barbara Manfredi, Italian noblewoman (b. 1444)
  - Isotta Nogarola, Italian writer and intellectual (b. 1418)
  - Nicolaus Zacharie, Italian composer (b. c. 1400)
