= 1464 =

1464 in various calendars
- Gregorian calendar: 1464; MCDLXIV
- Ab urbe condita: 2217
- Armenian calendar: 913; ԹՎ ՋԺԳ
- Assyrian calendar: 6214
- Balinese saka calendar: 1385–1386
- Bengali calendar: 870–871
- Berber calendar: 2414
- English Regnal year: 3 Edw. 4 – 4 Edw. 4
- Buddhist calendar: 2008
- Burmese calendar: 826
- Byzantine calendar: 6972–6973
- Chinese calendar: 癸未年 (Water Goat); 4161 or 3954 — to — 甲申年 (Wood Monkey); 4162 or 3955
- Coptic calendar: 1180–1181
- Discordian calendar: 2630
- Ethiopian calendar: 1456–1457
- Hebrew calendar: 5224–5225
- Hindu calendars
- Vikram Samvat: 1520–1521
- Shaka Samvat: 1385–1386
- Kali Yuga: 4564–4565
- Holocene calendar: 11464
- Igbo calendar: 464–465
- Iranian calendar: 842–843
- Islamic calendar: 868–869
- Japanese calendar: Kanshō 5 (寛正５年)
- Javanese calendar: 1380–1381
- Julian calendar: 1464; MCDLXIV
- Korean calendar: 3797
- Minguo calendar: 448 before ROC 民前448年
- Nanakshahi calendar: −4
- Thai solar calendar: 2006–2007
- Tibetan calendar: ཆུ་མོ་ལུག་ལོ་ (female Water-Sheep); 1590 or 1209 or 437 — to — ཤིང་ཕོ་སྤྲེ་ལོ་ (male Wood-Monkey); 1591 or 1210 or 438

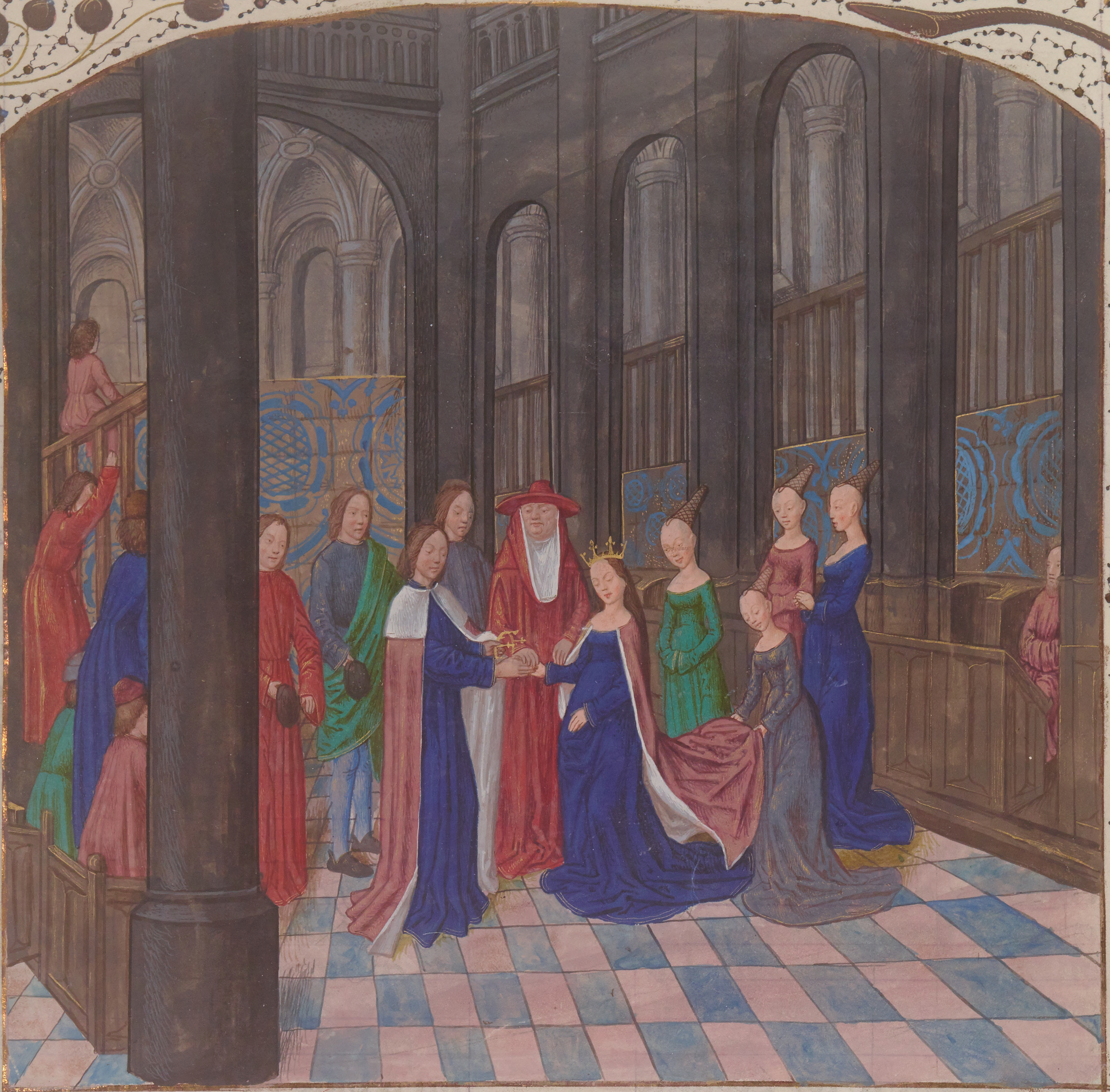
May 1: King Edward IV of England secretly marries commoner Elizabeth Woodville

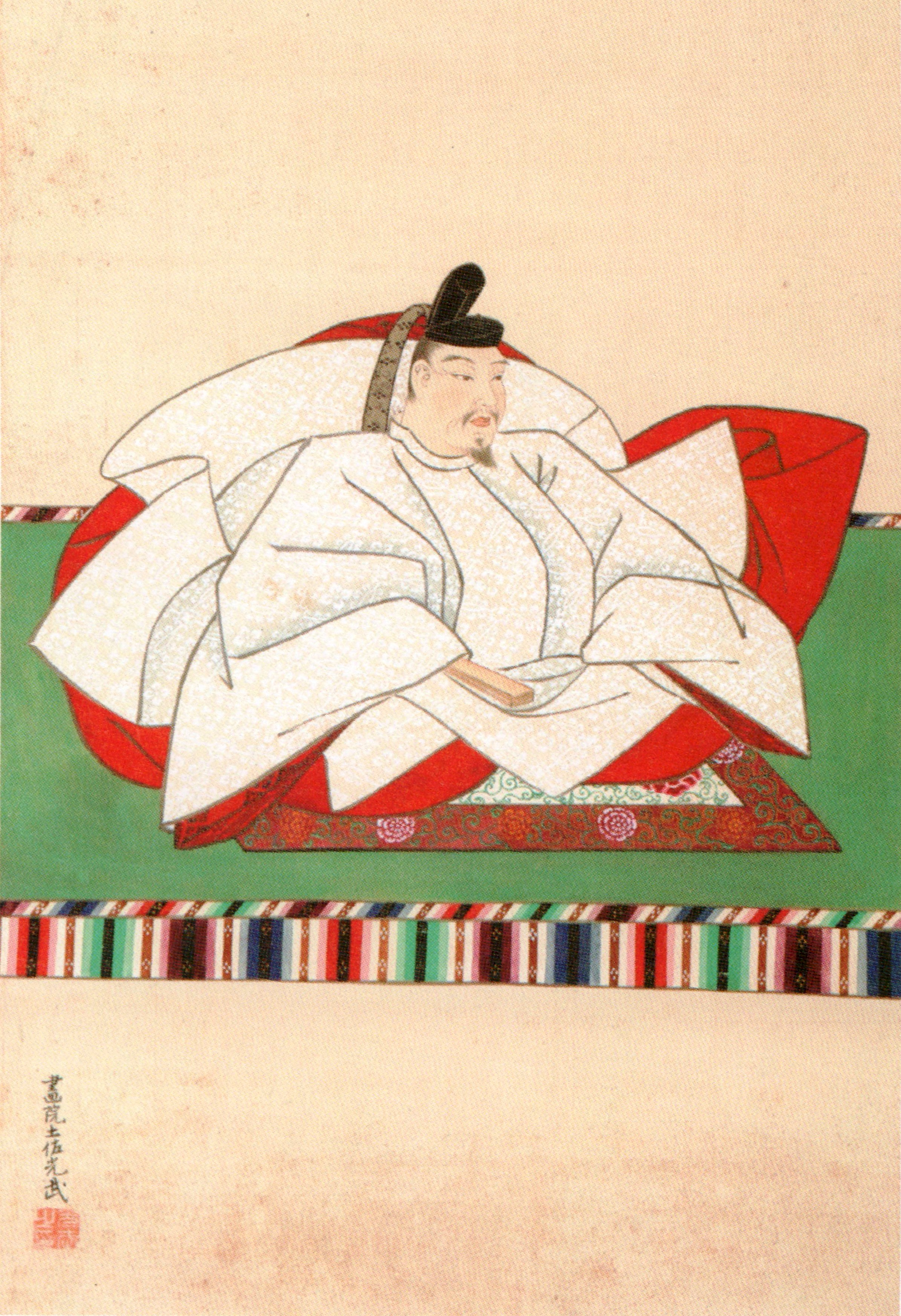
August 21: Go-Tsuchimikado becomes the Emperor of Japan on abdication of his father.

Year 1464 (MCDLXIV) was a leap year starting on Sunday of the Julian calendar.

== Events ==
=== January–March ===
- January 6 – The first assembly ever of the States General of the Netherlands is held as representatives from at least 17 provinces of the Burgundian Netherlands gather at Bruges. At least 81 delegates come from the clergy, nobility and general public from the Duchy of Brabant, the County of Flanders, Lille, Douai and Orchies, the County of Artois, the County of Hainaut, the County of Holland, the County of Zeeland, the County of Namur, the Lordship of Mechelen, and the Boulonnais, all with the reluctant assent of Philip the Good, Duke of Burgundy.
- January 21 – The English Parliament opens its second session during the reign of King Edward IV, gathering at Westminster, and will remain in session until March 28, 1465.
- February 7 – After leading the Ottoman Empire's conquest of his native Bosnia, General Isa-beg Isaković becomes the first Ottoman Governor of Bosnia. The province will remain under Turkish control for more than 400 years until 1878.
- February 12 – The first Estates General in the Netherlands adjourns after five weeks.
- February 23 – Prince Zhu Jianshen becomes the new Ming dynasty Emperor of China, taking the regnal name Emperor Xianzong upon the death of his father, the Emperor Yingzong of Ming. His reign is subsequently designated as the Chenghua Era.
- March 23 – Pope Pius II excommunicates the entire town of Prudnik (now part of Poland and its Roman Catholic inhabitants for its failure to pay its share of the debts owed to the Duke of Oels, Konrad IV the Elder.Tadeusz Kwaśniewski, (16 August 2002).
- March 25 – The coronation ceremony of Matthias Hunyadi as King Mátyás I of Hungary takes place in Székesfehérvár as Dénes Szécsi places the Crown of Saint Stephen on the King's head. Corvinus has reigned for more than six years at the time of his formal coronation.

=== April–June ===
- April 17 –Swedish separatist rebel Kettil Karlsson leads his troops to victory over King Christian I of Sweden in the Battle of Haraker.
- April 25 – Battle of Hedgeley Moor in England: Yorkist forces under John Neville defeat the Lancastrians under Sir Ralph Percy, who is killed.
- May 1 – Edward IV of England secretly marries Elizabeth Woodville, and keeps the marriage a secret for five months afterwards.
- May 15 – Battle of Hexham: Neville defeats another Lancastrian army, this one led by King Henry and Queen Margaret themselves. This marks the end of organized Lancastrian resistance for several years.
- June 1 – The Treaty of York, a 15-year-truce is signed by representatives of the kingdoms of England (ruled by King Edward IV) and Scotland (ruled by King James III).
- June 18 – Pope Pius II himself shoulders the cross of the Crusades, and departs for Ancona to participate in person. He names Skanderbeg general captain of the Holy See, under the title Athleta Christi. This plan forces Skanderbeg to break his ten-year peace treaty with the Ottomans signed in 1463, by attacking their forces near Ohrid.
- June 23 – King Christian of Sweden who is also King of Denmark and of Norway in the union of the three kingdoms, is declared deposed from the latter throne. His deposed predecessor Charles VIII of Sweden is re-elected to the throne on August 9.

=== July–September ===
- July 10 – The siege of Jajce in Bosnia, a strategic fortress under the control of Hungary, is started by the Ottoman Sultan Mehmed II with 30,000 troops under his command.
- August 21 – Emperor Go-Hanazono of Japan abdicates, and is succeeded by his son, Emperor Go-Tsuchimikado.
- August 22 – Sultan Mehmed II abandons the siege of Jajce after the Hungarian defenders have resisted for more than six weeks. The Sultan makes his decision after learning that King Mátyás I of Hungary has mobilized troops to come to the fortresses defense.
- August 28 – Nine days after the death of Pope Pius II, 19 of the 29 Roman Catholic cardinals meet in Rome for the conclave to elect a successor. On the first day, before voting for Pope, the cardinals vote to continue Pius's planned crusade against the Ottoman Empire, limiting the college of cardinals to only 24, and allowing only one cardinal-nephew to serve as a candidate.
- August 30 – Cardinal Pietro Barbo, Bishop of Vicenza, is elected as the new Pope, receiving 14 of the 19 votes On the first ballot, Cardinal Barbo had 11 of the 14 required, while the other eight were divided among Ludovico Trevisan and Guillaume d'Estouteville. Barbo takes the regnal name of Pope Paul II, 211th pope of the Roman Catholic Church.
- August – Sophronius I of Constantinople, Ecumenical Patriarch of Constantinople and leader of the Eastern Orthodox Christian Church, dies after a reign of 11 years and is succeeded by the former Partriarch, Gennadius II.
- September 7 – At Leipzig, Ernest, Landgrave of Thuringia, 23, becomes the new Elector of Saxony upon the death of his father, Friederich II, while his younger brother Albert III, 21, succeeds his father as the new Duke of Saxony.
- September 15 – At the Battle of Ohrid in what is now North Macedonia, ends with the Albanian leader Skanderbeg and a supplementary force from the Venetian Republic, luring an estimated 10,000 Ottoman Empire soldiers out of the walled city of Ohrid, then captures the group as prisoners and seizes the city.
- September 26 – A group of merchants from the Republic of Venice arrive in London, apparently infected with the bubonic plague and the disease begins to spread rapidly.
- September 29 – King Edward IV of England surprises his advisors and the nation by introducing Elizabeth Woodville as his wife at Reading Abbey, and revealing that he had been married for almost five months, the ceremony having taken place on May 1. The marriage outrages King Edward's mentor, Richard Neville, 16th Earl of Warwick, who had been arranging a marriage between the King and Bona of Savoy, sister-in-law of France's King Louis XI.

=== October–December ===
- October 5 – An intelligence report sent by a Venetian agent in Bruges to the Seignory of Venice reports that the death rate in London from the plague has reached 200 people per day, only nine days after the first case was discovered.
- November 11 – Filip I is appointed by the Grand Duke of Moscow as the new List of metropolitans and patriarchs of Moscow, leader of the Russian Orthodox Church, after the September 13 death of the Patriarch Theodosius.
- December 26 – Kettil Karlsson takes the title of riksföreståndare (national director) and reduces the role of King Karl VIII to figurehead status.

=== Date unknown ===
- In China, a small rebellion occurs in the interior province of Huguang, during the Ming Dynasty; a subsequent rebellion springs up in Guangxi, where a rebellion of the Miao people and Yao people forces the Ming throne to respond, by sending 30,000 troops (including 1,000 Mongol cavalry) to aid the 160,000 local troops stationed in the region, to crush the rebellion that will end in 1466.
- Jehan Lagadeuc writes a Breton-French-Latin dictionary called the Catholicon. It is the first French dictionary as well as the first Breton dictionary of world history, and it will be published in 1499.
- Tenguella, the founder of the Empire of Great Fulo, becomes chief of the Fula people.

== Births ==
- April 23
  - Robert Fayrfax, English Renaissance composer (d. 1521)
  - Joan of France, Duchess of Berry (d. 1505)
- May 6 – Sophia Jagiellon, Margravine of Brandenburg-Ansbach, Polish princess (d. 1512)
- May 30 – Barbara of Brandenburg, Bohemian queen (d. 1515)
- June 27 – Ernst II of Saxony, Archbishop of Magdeburg (1476–1513) and Administrator of Halberstadt (1480–1513) (d. 1513)
- July 1 – Clara Gonzaga, Italian noble (d. 1503)
- November 19 – Emperor Go-Kashiwabara of Japan (d. 1526)
- date unknown
  - Nezahualpilli, Aztec ruler (d. 1515)
  - Philippe Villiers de L'Isle-Adam, Grand Master of the Knights Hospitallers (d. 1534)

== Deaths ==
- January – Desiderio da Settignano, Italian sculptor (b. c. 1428 or 1430)
- February 23 – Zhengtong Emperor of China (b. 1427)
- March 8 – Catherine of Poděbrady, Hungarian queen consort (b. 1449)
- May 15 – Henry Beaufort, 3rd Duke of Somerset (executed) (b. 1436)
- May 17 – Thomas de Ros, 9th Baron de Ros, English politician (executed) (b. 1427)
- May 25 – Charles I, Count of Nevers (b. 1414)
- June 18 – Rogier van der Weyden, Flemish painter (b. 1399 or 1400)
- August 1 – Cosimo de' Medici, ruler of Florence (b. 1389)
- August 11 – Nicholas of Cusa, German mathematician and astronomer (b. 1401)
- August 12 – John Capgrave, English historian and theologian (b. 1393)
- August 14 – Pope Pius II (b. 1405)
- September 7 – Otto III, Duke of Pomerania-Stettin (1460–1464) (b. 1444)
- September 23 – Bernardo Rossellino, Italian sculptor and architect (b. 1409)
- September 26 – Benedetto Accolti the Elder, Italian jurist and historian (b. 1415)
- November 16 – John, Margrave of Brandenburg-Kulmbach (b. 1406)
- November 23 – Blessed Margaret of Savoy (b. 1382 or 1390)
- December 2 – Blanche II of Navarre (b. 1424)
- date unknown – Fra Mauro, Venetian Camaldolese monk, cartographer and accountant (b. c. 1400)
