= 1470 =

1470 in various calendars
- Gregorian calendar: 1470; MCDLXX
- Ab urbe condita: 2223
- Armenian calendar: 919; ԹՎ ՋԺԹ
- Assyrian calendar: 6220
- Balinese saka calendar: 1391–1392
- Bengali calendar: 876–877
- Berber calendar: 2420
- English Regnal year: 9 Edw. 4 – 10 Edw. 4
- Buddhist calendar: 2014
- Burmese calendar: 832
- Byzantine calendar: 6978–6979
- Chinese calendar: 己丑年 (Earth Ox); 4167 or 3960 — to — 庚寅年 (Metal Tiger); 4168 or 3961
- Coptic calendar: 1186–1187
- Discordian calendar: 2636
- Ethiopian calendar: 1462–1463
- Hebrew calendar: 5230–5231
- Hindu calendars
- Vikram Samvat: 1526–1527
- Shaka Samvat: 1391–1392
- Kali Yuga: 4570–4571
- Holocene calendar: 11470
- Igbo calendar: 470–471
- Iranian calendar: 848–849
- Islamic calendar: 874–875
- Japanese calendar: Bunmei 2 (文明２年)
- Javanese calendar: 1386–1387
- Julian calendar: 1470; MCDLXX
- Korean calendar: 3803
- Minguo calendar: 442 before ROC 民前442年
- Nanakshahi calendar: 2
- Thai solar calendar: 2012–2013
- Tibetan calendar: ས་མོ་གླང་ལོ་ (female Earth-Ox); 1596 or 1215 or 443 — to — ལྕགས་ཕོ་སྟག་ལོ་ (male Iron-Tiger); 1597 or 1216 or 444

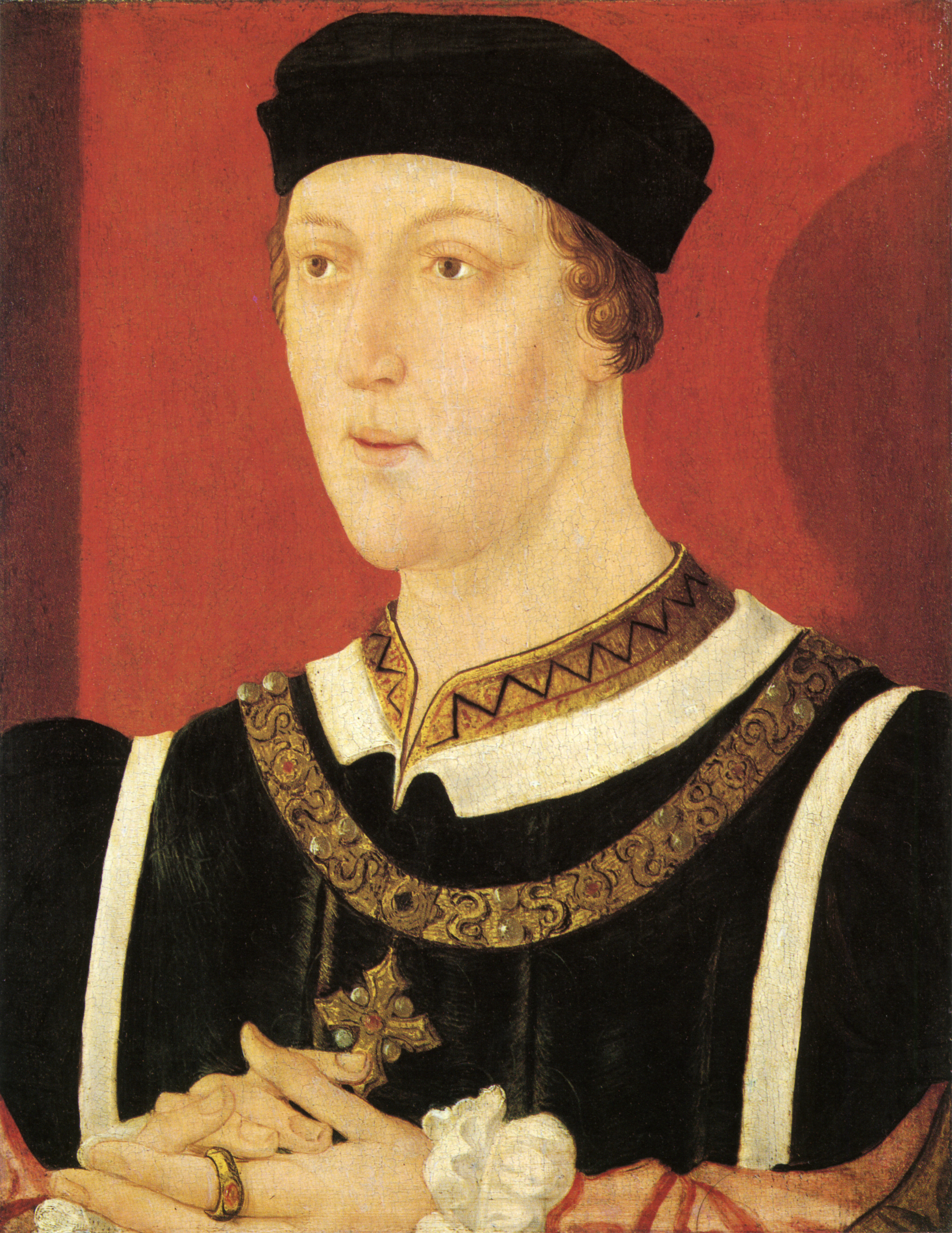
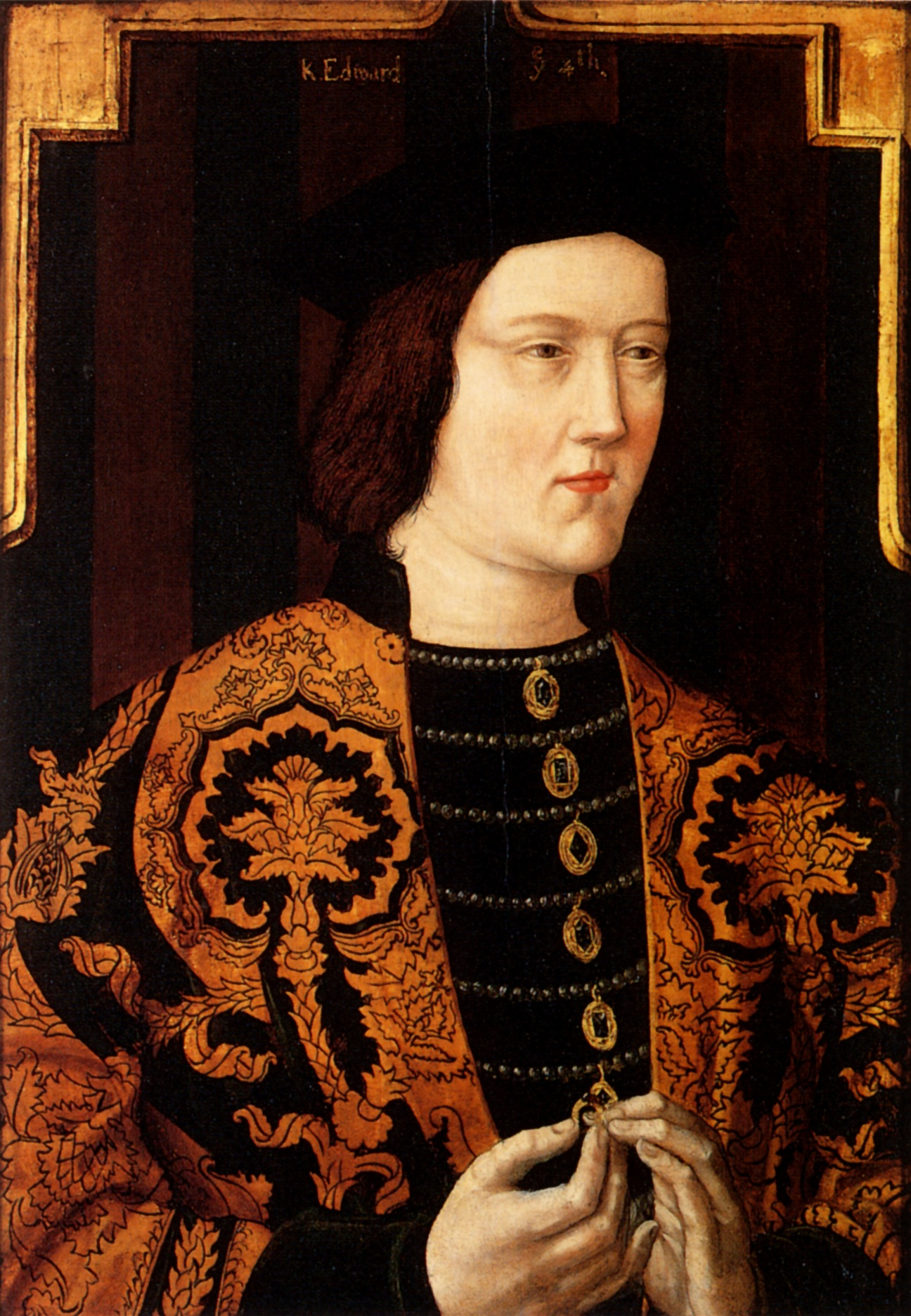
October 3: King Henry VI returns to the throne of England after King Edward IV flees.

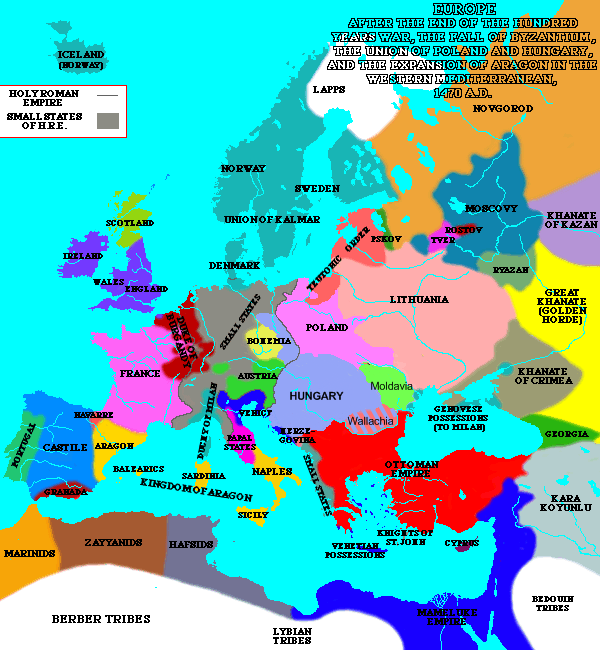
Europe in 1470

Year 1470 (MCDLXX) was a common year starting on Monday of the Julian calendar.

== Events ==
=== January–March ===
- January 9 – Grand Prince Jalsan of Joseon becomes the new King of Korea upon the death of his uncle, King Yejong. Jalisan takes the regnal name of King Seongjong.
- January 21 – Jacquetta of Luxembourg, mother of England's Queen Consort Elizabeth Woodville and mother-in-law of King Edward IV, is cleared of allegations of witchcraft that had been made against her in 1469 by a follower of the rebel Earl of Warwick.
- March 12 – Wars of the Roses in England – At the Battle of Losecoat Field, the House of York (supporters of King Edward IV) defeats the House of Lancaster (supporters of the former King Henry VI, led by Sir Robert Welles). Welles is captured and confesses that he had been hired by the Earl of Warwick and by King Edward's brother, George Plantagenet, Duke of Clarence to overthrow the King. Warwick and Clarence flee England and Welles is beheaded.
- March 20 – The Battle of Nibley Green is the last fought between the private armies of feudal magnates in England.

=== April–June ===
- April 5 – At Srinagar in the Kashmir Sultanate, the Sultan Zayn al-Abidin the Great dies after a reign of almost 52 years, and his succeeded by his son, Prince Haji Khan, who takes the name Haider Shah Miri on his proclamation as Sultan on May 12.
- May 6 – Yun Chaun becomes the new Chief State Councillor (Yonguijong, equivalent to a prime minister as head of government) of Korea, when he is appointed by King Seongjong to replace Hong Yunsŏng.
- May 15 – Charles VIII of Sweden, who has served three terms as King of Sweden, dies. Sten Sture the Elder proclaims himself Regent of Sweden the following day.
- June 1 – Sten Sture is recognised as the new King of Sweden by the estates.

=== July–September ===
- July 12 – During the Ottoman–Venetian War, the Ottomans capture the Greek island of Euboea, territory of the Republic of Venice, after a four week siege of the fortified city of Negroponte by the Sultan Mehmed II.
- August 20 – Battle of Lipnic: Stephen the Great defeats the Volga Tatars of the Golden Horde, led by Ahmed Khan.
- September 13 – A rebellion orchestrated by King Edward IV of England's former ally, Richard Neville, 16th Earl of Warwick, forces the King to flee England to seek support from his brother-in-law, Charles the Bold of Burgundy.

=== October–December ===
- October 3 – The Earl of Warwick releases King Henry VI of England from imprisonment in the Tower of London, and restores him to the throne.
- November 28 – Emperor Lê Thánh Tông of Đại Việt launches a naval expedition against Champa, beginning the Cham–Annamese War.
- December 18 – Lê Thánh Tông leads the Đại Việt army into Champa, conquering the country in less than three months.

=== Date unknown ===
- The Pahang Sultanate is established at Pahang Darul Makmur (in modern-day Malaysia).
- The first contact occurs between Europeans and the Fante nation of the Gold Coast, when a party of Portuguese land and meet with the King of Elmina.
- Johann Heynlin introduces the printing press into France and prints his first book this same year.
- In Tonga, in or around 1470, the Tuʻi Tonga Dynasty cedes its temporal powers to the Tuʻi Haʻatakalaua Dynasty, which will remain prominent until about 1600.
- Between this year and 1700, 8,888 witches are tried in the Swiss Confederation; 5,417 of them are executed.
- Sir George Ripley dedicates his book, The Compound of Alchemy, to the King Edward IV of England.
- The Chimor–Inca War ends with an Inca victory. The Chimor Empire is absorbed into the Inca Empire.

== Births ==
- January 1 – Magnus I, Duke of Saxe-Lauenburg, German noble (d. 1543)
- February 16 – Eric I, Duke of Brunswick-Lüneburg, Prince of Calenberg (1491–1540) (d. 1540)
- April 7 – Edward Stafford, 2nd Earl of Wiltshire (d. 1498)
- April 9 – Giovanni Angelo Testagrossa, Italian composer (d. 1530)
- May 20 – Pietro Bembo, Italian cardinal (d. 1547)
- June 30 – Charles VIII of France (d. 1498)
- July 13 – Francesco Armellini Pantalassi de' Medici, Italian Catholic cardinal (d. 1528)
- July 20 – John Bourchier, 1st Earl of Bath, English noble (d. 1539)
- July 30 – Hongzhi Emperor of China (d. 1505)
- August 4
  - Bernardo Dovizi, Italian Catholic cardinal (d. 1520)
  - Lucrezia de' Medici, Italian noblewoman (d. 1553)
- October 2
  - George I of Münsterberg, Imperial Prince, Duke of Münsterberg and Oels, Graf von Glatz (d. 1502)
  - Isabella of Aragon, Queen of Portugal, daughter of Isabella I of Castile and Ferdinand II of Aragon (d. 1498)
  - Isabella of Aragon, Duchess of Milan, daughter of Alfonso II of Naples (d. 1524)
- October 10 – Selim I, Sultan of the Ottoman Empire (d. 1520)
- October 15 – Konrad Mutian, German humanist (d. 1526)
- November 2 – King Edward V of England, the elder of the "Princes in the Tower" (d. c. 1483)
- November 28 – Wen Zhengming, artist in Ming dynasty China (d. 1559)
- December 5 – Willibald Pirckheimer, German humanist (d. 1530)
- date unknown
  - Purandara Dasa, Indian composer and saint (d. 1564)
  - Juan Díaz de Solís, Spanish navigator and explorer (d. 1516)
  - Tang Yin, Chinese painter (d. 1524)
  - Polydore Vergil, Urbinate/English historian (d. 1555)
- probable
  - Matthias Grünewald, German painter (d. 1528)
  - Hayuya, Taino chief (d. unknown)
  - Hugh Latimer, Protestant martyr (d. 1555)

== Deaths ==
- January 2 – Heinrich Reuß von Plauen, Grand Master of the Teutonic Order
- March 20 – Thomas Talbot, 2nd Viscount Lisle, English nobleman killed at the Battle of Nibley Green (b. c.1449)
- May 15 – Charles VIII of Sweden (b. 1409)
- August 31 – Frederick II, Count of Vaudémont (b. c.1428)
- October 18 – John Tiptoft, 1st Earl of Worcester, Lord High Treasurer (b. 1427)
- November 23 – Gaston, Prince of Viana (b. 1444)
- December 16 – John II, Duke of Lorraine (b. 1425)
- date unknown
  - Domenico da Piacenza, Italian dancing master (b. 1390)
  - Pal Engjëlli, Albanian Catholic clergyman (b. 1416)
- probable – Jacopo Bellini, Italian painter (b. 1400)
