= 1501 in Ireland =

- Centuries: 14th; 15th; 16th; 17th; 18th
- Decades: 1480s; 1490s; 1500s; 1510s; 1520s
- See also: Other events of 1501; List of years in Ireland

Events of 1501 in Ireland

== Incumbent ==
- Lord: Henry VII

== Events ==
- War among the people of Oriel (Airgíalla) occurred. This was an internal conflict between the descendants of Hugh Roe and the descendants of Redmond.
- Mac Mahon (Rossa) brought his creaghts (war bands) into the Loughty region.

== Deaths ==
- Niall, son of Owen O'Neill - Member of the O'Neill dynasty, one of the principal Gaelic Irish ruling families.
