= Lord Chancellor of Ireland =

Former highest political and judicial office in Ireland

The Lord High Chancellor of Ireland, commonly known as the Lord Chancellor of Ireland, was the highest ranking judicial office in Ireland until the establishment of the Irish Free State in 1922. From 1721 until the end of 1800, it was also the highest political office of the Irish Parliament; the Chancellor was Speaker of the Irish House of Lords. The Lord Chancellor was also Lord Keeper of the Great Seal of Ireland. In all three respects, the office mirrored the Lord High Chancellor of Great Britain.

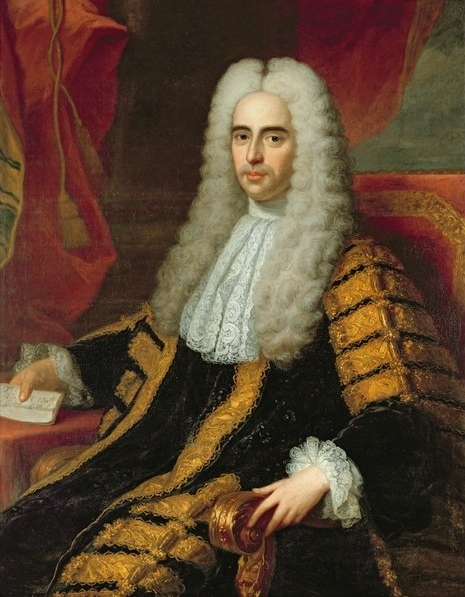
The Right Honourable John Methuen as Lord Chancellor of Ireland (c.1697)

== Origins ==
There is a good deal of confusion as to precisely when the office originated. Until the reign of Henry III of England, it is doubtful if the offices of Irish and English Chancellor were distinct. Only in 1232 is there a clear reference to a separate Court of Chancery (Ireland). Early Irish Lord Chancellors, beginning with Stephen Ridell in 1186, were simply the English Chancellor acting through a Deputy. In about 1244 the decision was taken that there must be separate holders of the office in England and Ireland. Elrington Ball states that the salary was fixed at sixty marks a year, equivalent to forty pounds sterling. Although it was twice what an itinerant justice was paid at the time, it was apparently not considered to be a very generous amount: Richard Northalis, Lord Chancellor 1393–97, complained that it did not cover even a third of his expenses, and asked for an extra payment of twenty pounds a year. In his case, it is thought that the hostility of his colleagues in government was responsible for the poor salary.

In the earlier centuries, the Lord Chancellor was always a cleric, and usually an Englishman. Lay Chancellors became common after the Reformation, and no cleric was appointed Chancellor after 1665, but although there were a number of exceptions, the Crown retained a preference for English-born Chancellors until the mid-nineteenth century.

== Lord Chancellors of Ireland, 1186–1922 ==
=== 12th century ===
- Stephen Ridell. Appointed in 1186. (first Chancellor). Came to Ireland in the entourage of the future King John, and was then referred to as "his Chancellor".

=== 13th century ===
- John de Worchley (1219–1234)
- Ralph Neville (1234–1235). Also Lord Chancellor of England, Bishop of Chichester and Archbishop of Canterbury.
- Alan de Sanctafide (1235–1237)
- Geoffrey de Turville, Bishop of Ossory (1237)
- Ralph de Norwich (1237–1238), same as below
- Robert Luttrell (1238–1245), Archdeacon of Armagh and Treasurer of St. Patrick's Cathedral, Dublin.
- William Welwood (1245–1246)
- Ralph de Norwich (1249-1256). He was elected Archbishop of Dublin in 1256, but his election was quashed by the Pope, on the grounds of his "secular" lifestyle and closeness to King Henry III. He surrendered the Great Seal of Ireland in 1356, returned to England and became a judge there.
- Fromund Le Brun (1259–1283). He was elected Archbishop of Dublin, but his election was contested by William de la Corner: the conflict lasted from 1271 to 1279. Pope Nicholas III declared both elections void in 1279, and appointed John de Derlington instead.
- Walter de Fulburn, Bishop of Waterford (1283–1288).
- William de Beverley, or Le Buerlaco (1288–1292).
- Thomas Cantock, Bishop of Emly (1292–1294).
- Adam de Wodington. Appointed in 1294.

=== 14th century ===
- Thomas Cantock, Bishop of Emly (1306–1308). The same as the above.
- Adam de Wodington (1308). The same as above.
- Richard de Beresford. Deputy in 1307, Chancellor in 1308
- Walter de Thornbury, died 1313: while he was travelling to Avignon to secure his election as Archbishop of Dublin, his ship was sunk in a storm and he drowned.
- Stephen Riddel (c. 1313–1318).
- William FitzJohn, Bishop of Ossory (1318– 1320). Later Archbishop of Cashel.
- Roger Utlagh, Prior of the Order of St. John of Jerusalem, Kilmainham. Appointed in 1321.
- Adam de Lymbergh (1330–1334)
- William, Prior of the Order of St. John of Jerusalem, Kilmainham (?1331–)
- Alexander de Bicknor, Primate of Ireland (c. 1335 – ?1337)
- Thomas Charlton, Bishop of Hereford (1337–1338).
- Robert de Hemmingburgh (1338–)
- Robert de Askeby (1340–)
- John L'Archers, Prior of the Order of St. John of Jerusalem. Appointed in 1343.
- John Morice. c. 1344-1349
- William de Bromley, Dean of St Patrick's Cathedral, Dublin (1346-1350)
- John de St Paul, Archbishop of Dublin (1350–1356)
- Richard d'Askeaton (1356)
- John Frowyk, Prior of the Order of St. John of Jerusalem (1357–1359)
- Thomas de Burley, Prior of the Order of St. John of Jerusalem (1359–1364)
- Robert de Ashton (1364)
- Thomas le Reve, Bishop of Waterford and Lismore (1367-1368)
- Thomas de Burley, Prior of the Order of St. John of Jerusalem (1368–1371), second term.
- John de Bothby (1371–1374)
- William Tany, Prior of the Order of St. John of Jerusalem (1374–1377).
  - John Keppock, Lord Keeper in the absence of William Tany to Jerusalem
- Robert Wikeford or de Wikeford, Archbishop of Dublin and Primate of Ireland (1377–1379)
- John Colton, Dean of St. Patrick's Cathedral (1379–1382). Later Archbishop of Armagh.
- William Tany, Prior of the Order of St. John of Jerusalem (1382–1385). The same as above.
- Ralph Cheyne (1383-4)
- Alexander de Balscot, Bishop of Ossory (1385–1388).
- Robert Preston, 1st Baron Gormanston 1388
- Richard Plunkett (1388–1393)
- Richard Northalis, Bishop of Ossory (1393–1397). Also Archbishop of Dublin and Primate of Ireland from 1395 to his death.
- Robert Braybrooke, Bishop of London (1397)

=== 15th century ===
- Thomas Cranley, Primate of Ireland (1401–1410)
  - Sir Laurence Merbury, Deputy Chancellor (1403–1410), who exercised the duties of Chancellor while Cranley was too ill to do so.
  - Thomas de Everdon, acted regularly as Deputy, and was briefly named as Chancellor in 1402.
  - Roger Hawkenshaw, acted as Deputy for Cranley in 1416, when he was again incapacitated by illness.
- Patrick Barrett, Bishop of Ferns (1410–1412)
- Thomas Le Boteller, Prior of Kilmainham. Lord Keeper (1412–1413). The name of his family would change to Butler.
  - Robert Sutton, Deputy Chancellor (1412–1413)
- Thomas Cranley, Primate of Ireland (1413–1417) (second term)
- Sir Laurence Merbury (1417) (second term)
- William Fitz Thomas, Prior of Kilmainham (c. 1417–1418)
- William Yonge, or Young, Archdeacon of Meath (c. 1418–1419)
- Richard Talbot, Primate of Ireland (1423–1426)
- William Fitz Thomas (1426) (second term)
- Sir Richard FitzEustace (1426)
- Richard Talbot, Primate of Ireland (1426–1441)
- Thomas Chase (1441–1446)
- Richard Wogan (1446–1449), Lord Chancellor
  - William Chevir (1446–1449), Deputy Chancellor
- Walter Devereux (1449–1451)
- Edmund, Earl of Rutland (1451–1460). Lord Chancellor, a minor who acted through Edmund Oldhall.
  - Edmund Oldhall (1451–1454), Bishop of Meath, Deputy Chancellor, who exercised the duties of the office of Chancellor since Rutland was underage
  - John Talbot, later 2nd Earl of Shrewsbury (1454–1460). Deputy Chancellor, exercised the duties of the office.
- John Dynham (1460–1461), Lord Chancellor
  - Sir Robert Preston, 1st Viscount Gormanston, Deputy Chancellor
- Sir William Welles (1461–1462)
- John Tiptoft, 1st Earl of Worcester (1462–1463). By decree of Edward IV of England, he held the title of Lord Chancellor for life. He continued receiving the salary of the position and exercising some of its functions until his death in 1470.
- Thomas FitzGerald, 7th Earl of Kildare (c. 1463 – 1468). By decree of Edward IV of England, he held the title of Lord Chancellor for life. He continued receiving the salary of the position and exercising some of its functions until his death in 1478.
- Robert Allanstown (1468–1469)
- William Dudley (1469–1472)
- Joint Lord Chancellors of Ireland (1472–1477)
  - Robert FitzEustace
  - John Tapton
- Gilbert Debenham (1474)
- Rowland FitzEustace, 1st Baron Portlester (1474–1479)
- William Sherwood, Bishop of Meath (1480–1482)
- Walter Champfleur, Abbot of St Mary's Abbey, Dublin (Lord Keeper, or by some accounts Lord

Chancellor 1479 and 1482-1483)

- Robert St Lawrence, 3rd Baron Howth (May 1483, but probably died a few months later)
- Sir Thomas FitzGerald of Laccagh (c.1483 – 1487)
- Rowland FitzEustace, 1st Baron Portlester (1487–1492). The same as above.
- Alexander Plunket (1492–1494)
- Henry Deane, later Archbishop of Canterbury (1494–1495)
- Walter Fitzsimon, Primate of Ireland (1496–1511)

=== 16th century ===
- William Rokeby, Primate of Ireland (1512–1513)
- Sir William Compton (1513–1515)
- William Rokeby, Primate of Ireland (1515–1521). The same as above.
- Hugh Inge, Primate of Ireland (1522–1528)
- John Alen, Primate of Ireland (1528–1532)
- George Cromer, Archbishop of Armagh (1532–1534)
- John Barnewall, 3rd Baron Trimlestown (1534–1538)
- Sir John Alan (1538–1546, 1548–1551). Lord Keeper from 1538 to 1539, Lord Chancellor from 1539 to 1546: removed but later reinstated.
- Sir Thomas Cusack 1 May 1546 (Lord Keeper)
- Sir Richard Reade (6 December 1546 – 1548)
- Sir John Alan (1548–1551)
- Sir Thomas Cusack (1551–1554)
- Sir William Fitzwilliam, Lord Keeper (1554)
- Hugh Curwen (1555–1567). Lord Chancellor from 1555 to 1558, Lord Keeper from 1558 to 1559, Lord Chancellor from 1559 to 1567.
- Robert Weston, Dean of the Arches (1567–1573)
- Adam Loftus (Lord Keeper) (1573–1576)
- Sir William Gerard (1576–1581)
- Adam Loftus (1581–1605) the same as the above.

=== 17th century ===
- Commissioners of the Great Seal of Ireland (1605)
  - Thomas Jones, Bishop of Meath
  - Sir James Ley Lord Chief Justice of Ireland
  - Sir Edmund Pelham Lord Chief Baron of the Exchequer for Ireland
  - Sir Anthony St Leger Master of the Rolls in Ireland
- Thomas Jones (1605–1619)
- Commissioners of the Great Seal of Ireland (1619)
  - Sir William Jones Lord Chief Justice of Ireland
  - Sir William Methold Lord Chief Baron of the Exchequer for Ireland
  - Sir Francis Aungier Master of the Rolls in Ireland
- Adam Loftus, 1st Viscount Loftus (1619–1639)
- Sir Richard Bolton (1639 – November 1648)
- Commissioners of the Great Seal of Ireland (14 June 1655−1656)
  - Richard Pepys Lord Chief Justice of Ireland, Chief Commissioner (1655–1656)
  - Gerard Lowther Chief Justice of the Irish Common Pleas, Second Commissioner (1655–1656)
  - Miles Corbet Chief Baron of the Irish Exchequer, Third Commissioner (1655–1656)
- William Steele (1656–1660)
- Sir Maurice Eustace (1660–1665)
- Michael Boyle (1665–1686)
- Sir Charles Porter (1686–1687)
- Sir Alexander Fitton (1687–1690)
- Commissioners of the Great Seal of Ireland (1690)
  - Sir Richard Pyne (1690)
  - Sir Richard Ryves (1690)
  - Robert Rochfort (1690)
- Charles Porter (second term) (29 December 1690 – 1696)
- Commissioners of the Great Seal of Ireland (1696–1697)
  - Sir John Jeffreyson
  - Thomas Coote
  - Nehemiah Donnellan
- John Methuen (11 March 1697 – 1703)

=== 18th century ===
- Sir Richard Cox, 1st Baronet (1703–1707)
- Richard Freeman (11 June 1707 – 1710)
- Commissioners of the Great Seal of Ireland (1710–1)
  - Robert FitzGerald, 19th Earl of Kildare
  - William King
  - Thomas Keightley
- Sir Constantine Henry Phipps (22 January 1711 – September 1714)
- Alan Brodrick, 1st Viscount Midleton (11 October 1714 – 1725)
- Richard West (29 May 1725 – 1726)
- Thomas Wyndham, 1st Baron Wyndham (13 December 1726 – 1739)
- Robert Jocelyn, 1st Viscount Jocelyn (7 September 1739 – 3 December 1756)
- John Bowes, 1st Baron Bowes (11 March 1757 – 22 July 1767) (Attorney-General, 1739–41)
- James Hewitt, 1st Viscount Lifford (24 November 1767 – 28 April 1789)
- Commissioners of the Great Seal of Ireland (1789)
  - Robert Fowler
  - Hugh Carleton Chief Justice of the Irish Common Pleas
  - Sir Samuel Bradstreet
- John FitzGibbon, 1st Earl of Clare (20 June 1789 – 28 January 1802) (sitting Attorney-General)

=== 19th century ===
- John Freeman-Mitford, 1st Baron Redesdale (15 February 1802 – 1806)
- George Ponsonby (25 March 1806 – 1807)
- Thomas Manners-Sutton, 1st Baron Manners (23 April 1807 – 1827)
- Sir Anthony Hart (5 November 1827– November 1830)
- William Plunket, 1st Baron Plunket (23 December 1830 – November 1834) (Attorney-General, 1805–07 and 1822–27)
- Sir Edward Sugden (13 January 1835 – April 1835)
- William Plunket, 1st Baron Plunket (30 April 1835 – 1841) (see above)
- John Campbell, 1st Baron Campbell (22 June 1841)
- Sir Edward Sugden (3 October 1841 – 1846) (see above)
- Maziere Brady (16 July 1846 – 1852) (Attorney-General, 1839–40)
- Francis Blackburne (1852) (Attorney-General 1831-34 and 1841–42)
- Maziere Brady (1852–1858) (see above)
- Sir Joseph Napier (1858–1859) (Attorney-General, 1852)
- Maziere Brady (1859–1866) (see above)
- Francis Blackburne (1866–1867) (see above)
- Abraham Brewster (Attorney-General, 1853–55) (1867–1868)
- Thomas O'Hagan, 1st Baron O'Hagan (1868–1874) (Attorney-General, 1861-65)
- Commissioners of the Great Seal of Ireland (1874–1875)
  - Sir Joseph Napier, Chief Commissioner (1874–1875)
  - James Anthony Lawson (1874–1875)
  - William Brooke (1874–1875)
- John Ball (1875–1880) (sitting Attorney-General)
- Thomas O'Hagan, 1st Baron O'Hagan (1880–1881) (see above)
- Hugh Law (1881–1883) (sitting Attorney-General)
- Sir Edward Sullivan, 1st Baronet (1883–1885) (Attorney-General, 1868)
- John Naish (1885) (sitting Attorney-General)
- Edward Gibson, 1st Baron Ashbourne (1885–1886) (Attorney-General, 1877–80)
- John Naish (1886) (see above)
- Edward Gibson, 1st Baron Ashbourne (1886–1892) (see above)
- Samuel Walker (1892–1895) (Attorney-General, February–August 1886)
- Edward Gibson, 1st Baron Ashbourne (29 June 1895 – 1905) (see above)

=== 20th century ===
| Name (Birth–Death) | Term of office | | Other peerage(s) | Monarch (Reign) | Notes |
|---|---|---|---|---|---|
| Sir Samuel Walker, 1st Baronet (1832–1911) | 12 December 1905 | 13 August 1911^{†} | Baronet in 1906 | Edward VII | (Lord Chancellor, 1892–95) |
| Sir Samuel Walker, 1st Baronet (1832–1911) | 12 December 1905 | 13 August 1911^{†} | Baronet in 1906 | George V | (Lord Chancellor, 1892–95) |
| Redmond Barry (1866–1913) | 26 September 1911 | 11 July 1913^{†} | – | George V | (sitting Attorney-General) |
| Sir Ignatius O'Brien (1857–1930) | 10 April 1913 | 1918 | Baronet in 1916; Baron Shandon in 1918 | George V | (sitting Attorney-General) |
| Sir James Campbell (1851–1931) | 4 June 1918 | 1921 | Baronet in 1917; Baron Glenavy in 1921 | George V | (Attorney-General, 1905, 1916–17; Lord Chief Justice, 1917–18) |
| Sir John Ross, 1st Baronet (1853–1935) | 27 June 1921 | 27 December 1922 | Baronet in 1919 | George V | – |
