= Cormac Ó Curnín =

Cormac Ó Curnín who died in 1475 was an Irish poet.

Ó Curnín was a member of a brehon literary family of Breifne.

His death was recorded in Annals of the Four Masters in the year 1475 with the statements:

- "Cormac O'Cuirnin, Preceptor of the learned of Ireland ... died".

== See also ==
- Ruaidrí Ó Curnín, died 1496
- Conor Carragh Ó Curnín, died 1498
- Ferceirtne Ó Curnín, died 1519
- Domhnall Glas Ó Curnín, died 1519
