= 1481 in Ireland =

- Centuries: 13th; 14th; 15th; 16th; 17th
- Decades: 1460s; 1470s; 1480s; 1490s; 1500s
- See also: Other events of 1481; List of years in Ireland

Events from the year 1481 in Ireland.

== Incumbent ==
- Lord: Edward IV

== Events ==
- Christ Church Lands Act 1481^{(Republic of Ireland)} -Priory of Holy Trinity Dublin to have licence to retain and accept lands, etc.
- Aodh Ruadh Ó Domhnaill, King of Tir Chonaill, captured Conn son of Énri O'Neill
- Conn O'Neill (d. 1482), Lord of Clandeboye captures and blinds Patrick Savage, seneschal of Ulster, his title to be passed to Roland Savage
- Robert St Lawrence, Baron Howth, launched a legal dispute with Dublin Corporation over customs arrangements
- Dominick Dubh Lynch, founder of Galway city, married Juliana Dene, with permission from Pope Sixtus IV despite their kinship

== Deaths ==
- 22 October – Michael, Bishop of Glendalough
- Maolmórdha O'Reilly of East Breifne killed
