= 1492 in Ireland =

- Centuries: 13th; 14th; 15th; 16th; 17th
- Decades: 1470s; 1480s; 1490s; 1500s; 1510s
- See also: Other events of 1492; List of years in Ireland

Events from the year 1492 in Ireland.

== Incumbent ==
- Lord: Henry VII

== Events ==
- March – pretender to the English throne Perkin Warbeck is brought from Cork to Harfleur by the fleet of Charles VIII of France.
- The Butler – Fitzgerald dispute is resolved at the 'door of reconciliation' in St Patrick's Cathedral, Dublin.
- Archbishop Walter Fitzsimon is appointed Lord Deputy of Ireland.
- James Ormonde is appointed Lord Treasurer of Ireland.
- Alexander Plunket is appointed Lord Chancellor of Ireland.

== Deaths ==
- October 25 – Thaddeus McCarthy, Bishop of Ross, then Bishop of Cork and Cloyne (b. c. 1455)
- James Fleming, 7th Baron Slane, member of the Parliament of Ireland (from sweating sickness).
- Aedh Mac Fhlannchaidh, brehon lawyer and Ollamh of Thomond.
