= 1486 in Ireland =

- Centuries: 13th; 14th; 15th; 16th; 17th
- Decades: 1460s; 1470s; 1480s; 1490s; 1500s
- See also: Other events of 1486; List of years in Ireland

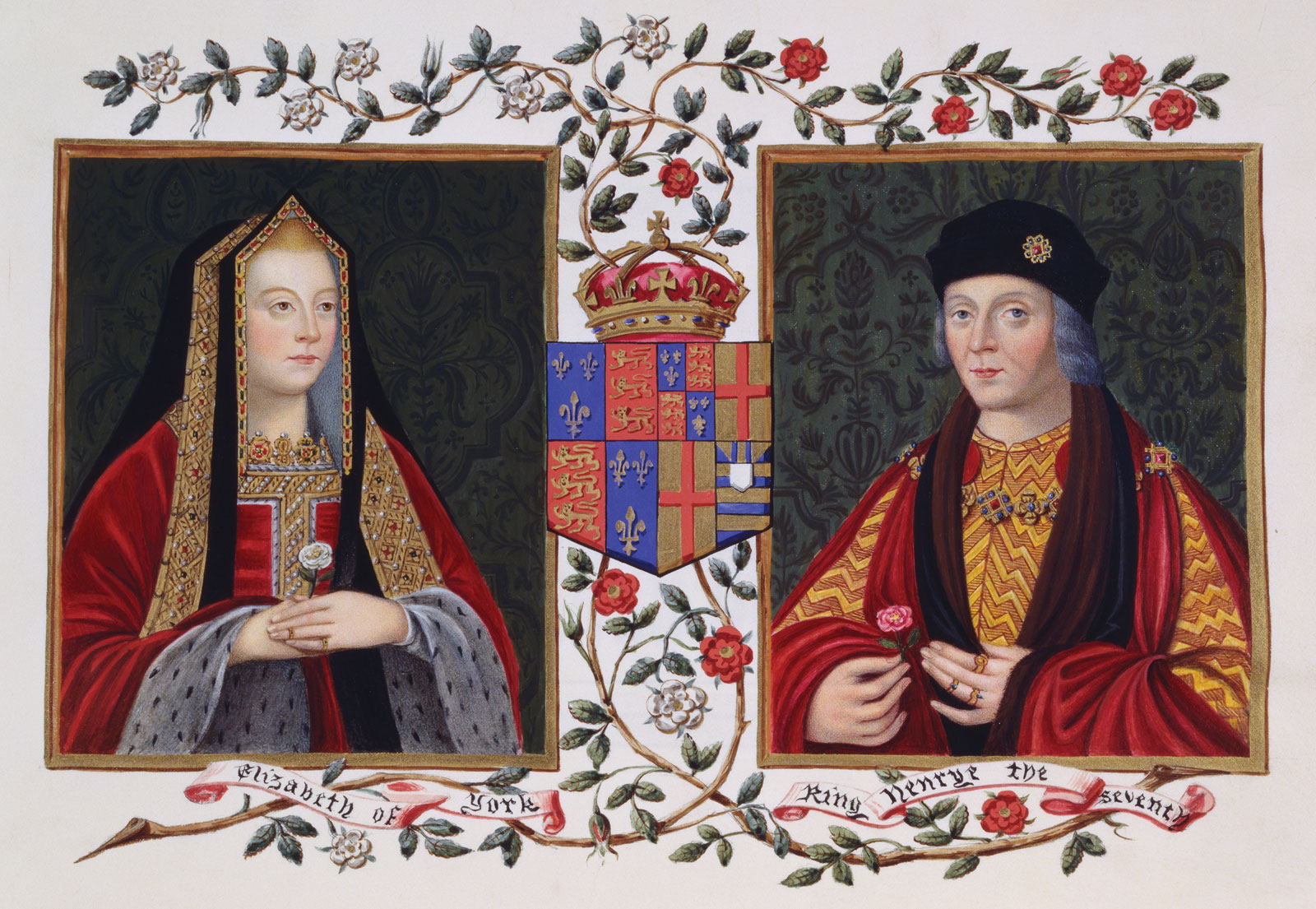
The Wars of the Roses are formally ended by the union of Elizabeth of York and King Henry VII of the House of Lancaster.

Events from the year 1486 in Ireland.

== Incumbent ==
- Lord: Henry VII of England

== Events ==
- 18 January – Henry VII marries Elizabeth of York, uniting the Lancastrian and Yorkist claims.
- 5 November – At Enniskillen, capital of the Kingdom of Fermanagh, currently County Fermanagh in Northern Ireland, King Éamonn mac Thomáis Óig abdicates and is succeeded briefly by his brother Thomáis Óg mac Thomáis Óig, who Seánn mac Pilib meic Thomáis Mhóir deposes before the end of the year.
