= 1488 in Ireland =

- Centuries: 13th; 14th; 15th; 16th; 17th
- Decades: 1460s; 1470s; 1480s; 1490s; 1500s
- See also: Other events of 1488; List of years in Ireland

Events from the year 1488 in Ireland.

== Incumbent ==
- Lord: Henry VII

== Events ==
- 3 August - Thaddeus McCarthy is forcibly deprived of his seat as Bishop of Ross
- Rathbornes Candles is established in Dublin

== Deaths ==
- Farrell Mac an Ruagaire
