= 1519 in poetry =

This article covers 1519 in poetry. Nationality words link to articles with information on the nation's poetry or literature (for instance, Irish or France).

== Works published ==
- Timanna, Parijatapahanannamu, Indian, Telugu-language narrative poem
- Thomas Murner, Geuchmat ("Meadow of Fools"), a verse satire; Germany

== Births ==
Death years link to the corresponding "[year] in poetry" article:

- Gutierre de Cetina (died 1554), Spanish poet and soldier
- Nicholas Grimald, birth year uncertain (died 1562), English poet and translator

== Deaths ==
Birth years link to the corresponding "[year] in poetry" article:

- Habibi, possible date (born c. 1470), Azerbaijani poet
- Ferceirtne Ó Curnín (born unknown), Irish poet
- Domhnall Glas Ó Curnín (born unknown), Irish poet

== See also ==
- Poetry
- 16th century in poetry
- 16th century in literature
- French Renaissance literature
- Grands Rhétoriqueurs
- Renaissance literature
- Spanish Renaissance literature
