= 1505 in Ireland =

- Centuries: 14th; 15th; 16th; 17th; 18th
- Decades: 1480s; 1490s; 1500s; 1510s; 1520s
- See also: Other events of 1505; List of years in Ireland

Events from the year 1505 in Ireland.

== Incumbent ==
- Lord: Henry VII

== Events ==
- June 21 – Piers Butler, future 8th Earl of Ormond appointed seneschal of Tipperary Liberty
- Thomas Butler, 7th Earl of Ormond, leases Irish estates to Piers Butler, his eventual successor
- Gerald FitzGerald, 8th Earl of Kildare invested as Knight of the Garter by Henry VII

== Births ==
- Thomas Cusack, (disputed) Lord Chancellor of Ireland

== Deaths ==
- July 11 - Hugh Roe O'Donnell, King of Tyrconnell
