= Hugh Conway (Lord Treasurer) =

Sir Hugh Conway (or Conwey) (1440–22 March 1518), was a member of the royal household of king Henry VII who served in a number of official posts including Lord High Treasurer of Ireland and Treasurer of Calais.

== Family ==
Hugh Conway was a son of John 'Aer Conwy Hen' of Bodrhyddan Hall and Constable of Rhuddlan Castle, Flintshire, Wales, by his first marriage, and descended from the ancient line of Conwy (from Conway, Wales) and de Crevecoeur.

Hugh's younger half-brother by their father's second marriage was Edward Conway. Edward married Anne, heiress of Arrow and Alcester, Warwickshire. Anne was the daughter of an earlier marriage of Joyce Burdet, who married Hugh. Edward was great-grandfather to Edward Conway, 1st Viscount Conway of Ragley Hall, and ancestor of the present family of Seymour Conways, Marquis of Hertford.

== Career ==
Hugh Conway was an early supporter of Henry Tudor, Earl of Richmond (later Henry VII). In 1483 he was sent by Henry's mother, Margaret Beaufort, to Henry in exile in France, with a large sum of money and encouragement to invade England through Wales and seize the crown from Richard III. Henry did so in 1485 and Richard was killed at the Battle of Bosworth, where Hugh was present.

Conway was appointed Keeper of the Great Wardrobe by Henry VII on 21 September 1485, and was knighted in January 1486 at the coronation of Queen Elizabeth of York, daughter of King Edward IV. He joined Henry's army at Nottingham during the king's journey to York to put down the Northern Rising of 1489.

He was created Lord Treasurer of Ireland in 1494 by Henry VII, replacing Sir James Ormond. He was appointed Sheriff of Buckinghamshire and Bedfordshire in 1500. In June 1504 he was appointed Treasurer of Calais by Henry VII, by which time he had been created a knight of the body.

=== Calais ===
During Conway's time in Calais, there was apparently deep and widespread anxiety about the increasingly frail king's health, with fears that he might die soon. The succession to the throne was not certain, with Edward Stafford, 3rd Duke of Buckingham and Edmund de la Pole, 3rd Duke of Suffolk being touted as possible claimants to the crown.

The Lieutenant of Calais, Sir Nicholas Vaux and Sir Anthony Browne, the Lieutenant of Guines castle had told Conway that they were ready to support the Duke of Suffolk's claim; and there were fears that Lady Lucy Neville, Browne's wife, was ready to secretly allow the Duke of Suffolk (who was her cousin) and his followers into Calais castle through the postern gate in the event of Henry's death.

Conway related all this to a certain John Flamank (brother of Thomas Flamank), as well as his own fears that Lord Giles Daubeney, 1st Baron Daubeney was packing the Yeomen of the Guard with his own household servants; and that the majority of men in Calais were of "my lord Daubeney's preferment." Flamanck put all this information from Conway in a very long and detailed letter to the king, written after June 1504, and received by late 1506. Although Daubeney was not specifically charged with any treasonable activity, at the end of 1506 he was accused of embezzlement at Calais: in December he was fined £1,200, and surrendered his French pension of 2,000 crowns.

== Personal life ==
He married twice: (1) Joyce (d.1489), daughter of Sir Simon Montfort Knt., of Coleshill, Warwickshire, by his spouse Anne, daughter of Sir Richard Verney, Knt., of Compton Verney, Warwickshire. He was her second husband and they had no issue. (2) Elizabeth, in 1490, daughter of Sir Thomas Courtenay, Earl of Devon.

Joyce, his first wife, was the widow of one Richard Burdet (or Burdett), who held the manor of Arrow, Warwickshire through his half-brother and stepmother Margaret. Margaret, the mother of Richard Burdet, was the second wife of Thomas Burdet of Arrow, a squire in the household of Duke of Clarence who was executed for treason.

In 1477 Thomas Burdet published and circulated treasonable writings in London, inciting rebellion aimed at dethroning king Edward IV and removing his eldest son (Edward V) by Elizabeth Woodville. The logical beneficiary would have been Burdet's employer, the Duke of Clarence, the king's brother. After his arrest, Burdet implicated an Oxford astronomer named John Stacey of Merton College whom he had requested to draw up the king's horoscope to find out when the king might die. Burdet and Stacey were tried and found guilty of treason and executed in May 1477; a chaplain of Merton, Thomas Blake, was also found guilty but pardoned.

The Duke of Clarence himself was caught up in the allegations (it is possible that Edward had read Burdet's verses), arrested, prosecuted at a trial by the king in person, and executed in the Tower of London in February 1478. Joyce held one-third of the manor of Arrow in dower; with Richard Burdet, the son of the executed traitor, she had a daughter and heiress Anne, who held two-thirds of the manor of Arrow. Anne married Hugh Conway's half-brother Edward.
