= Privy Seal of England =

English government office and seal

The privy seal of England originally served to authenticate the king's personal communication and can be traced back to the reign of King John in the early thirteenth century. While the Great Seal was required to remain in Chancery, the Privy Seal travelled with the sovereign. However, during the second half of King Edward III's reign, in the mid-fourteenth century, the Office of the Privy Seal took on various additional government roles. This led to the development of a third seal, known at first as the "secret" seal, to handle the private communication that had been the original remit of the Privy Seal.

By the end of Edward III's reign, this seal was known as the Signet and was in the custody of the King's Secretary. As such it is the precursor to the seals of office held by today's Secretaries of State.

The Great Seal Act 1884 (47 & 48 Vict. c. 30) effectively ended the use of the Privy Seal by providing that it was no longer necessary for any instrument to be passed under the Privy Seal.

== Keepers of the Privy Seal ==
The Privy Seal of England was originally overseen by the Clerks of the King's Chamber, but soon came to be kept by the controller of the wardrobe; by 1323, however, the distinct office of Keeper of the Privy Seal had emerged with the appointment of Adam de Lymbergh (the first Keeper, who was not also Controller, having been appointed in 1307). The present-day title of this office, Lord Privy Seal, is first recorded in 1539.
