= Mac Giolla Seanáin =

Mac Giolla Seanáin was the name of an Irish brehon family.

Originally of Tyrone, members of the Mac Giolla Seanáin family spread into Leinster. It is now found as Gilsenan, Gilshenan, Gilshannon and several other variants.

== See also ==
- Fedlim Mac Giolla Seanáin, d. 1507.
