= 1500 in Ireland =

- Centuries: 13th; 14th; 15th; 16th; 17th
- Decades: 1480s; 1490s; 1500s; 1510s; 1520s
- See also: Other events of 1500; List of years in Ireland

Events in the year 1500 in Ireland.

Ireland likely had a sparse population in 1500, the total population is estimated to be about 800,000.

== Incumbent ==
- Lord: Henry VII

== Events ==
- Gerald FitzGerald, 8th Earl of Kildare suppressed an uprising in Cork. The mayor was hung as a result of the retaliation.
- Eóghan Ó Ruairc became king in the Kingdom of Breifne.

== Deaths ==
- Feidhlimidh Ó Ruairc king of Breifne passes away.

== See also ==
- 1500 in Scotland
