= Conor Carragh Ó Curnín =

Conor Carragh Ó Curnín (died 1498) was an Irish poet.

Ó Curnín was a member of a brehon literary family of Breifne.

The Annals of the Four Masters record his death, sub anno 1498:

- O'Cuirnin, i.e. Conor Carragh, died.

== See also ==
- Cormac Ó Curnín, died 1474
- Ruaidrí Ó Curnín, died 1496
- Ferceirtne Ó Curnín, died 1519
- Domhnall Glas Ó Curnín, died 1519
