= 1485 in Ireland =

- Centuries: 13th; 14th; 15th; 16th; 17th
- Decades: 1460s; 1470s; 1480s; 1490s; 1500s
- See also: Other events of 1485; List of years in Ireland

Events from the year 1485 in Ireland.

== Incumbent ==
- Lord: Richard III (until 22 August), then Henry VII

== Events ==
Ulick Fionn Burke, became 6th lord of Clanricarde (died 1509)

== Deaths ==
- Ulick Ruadh Burke, the 5th Clanricarde
