= 1499 in Ireland =

- Centuries: 13th; 14th; 15th; 16th; 17th
- Decades: 1470s; 1480s; 1490s; 1500s; 1510s
- See also: Other events of 1499; List of years in Ireland

Events from the year 1499 in Ireland.

== Incumbent ==
- Lord: Henry VII

== Events ==
- Construction begins on the Pale ditch surrounding Dublin.
- Stephen Lynch fitz James, future Mayor of Galway (on three occasions), is made bailiff.
