= 1516 in Ireland =

- Centuries: 14th; 15th; 16th; 17th; 18th
- Decades: 1490s; 1500s; 1510s; 1520s; 1530s
- See also: Other events of 1516; List of years in Ireland

Events from the year 1516 in Ireland.

== Incumbent ==
- Lord: Henry VIII

== Events ==
The Book of Fenagh Irish: Leabar Fidhnacha is a manuscript of prose and poetry written in Classical Irish by Muirgheas mac Pháidín Ó Maolconaire in the monastery at Fenagh, County Leitrim. It was commissioned by Tadhg O'Roddy, the coarb of the monastery, and is believed to derive from the "old Book of Caillín" (Irish: Leabar Chaillín), a lost work about Caillín, founder of the monastery. Ó Maolconaire began work about 1516.

== Deaths ==
- Uilliam Ó Fearghail
