= 1497 in Ireland =

- Centuries: 13th; 14th; 15th; 16th; 17th
- Decades: 1470s; 1480s; 1490s; 1500s; 1510s
- See also: Other events of 1497; List of years in Ireland

Events from the year 1497 in Ireland.

== Incumbent ==
- Lord: Henry VII

== Events ==
- July – Perkin Warbeck, Pretender to the English throne, lands in the south of Ireland but attracts little support.
- Start of great famine.

== Deaths ==
- James Ormonde, Lord Treasurer of Ireland, Earl of Ormonde (b. c. 1418)
