= 1502 in Ireland =

- Centuries: 14th; 15th; 16th; 17th; 18th
- Decades: 1480s; 1490s; 1500s; 1510s; 1520s
- See also: Other events of 1502; List of years in Ireland

With the exception of the city of Galway (a walled city of stately homes and prosperous merchants), western Ireland has been described as a wild and desolate land during this time, with few trading commodities and little industry. In 1502, fishing was the dominant industry on the west coast. Recognised internationally for abundant cod, hake and herring, the coastline attracted fishing fleets from as far as Spain.

In a period characterised by individual power struggles and frequent conflict between neighbouring clans, Clanricarde had experienced decades of stability brought by Ulick Ruadh Burke and Ulick Fionn Burke.

In October 1502, records show Sir William Darcy of Platten, the newly appointed receiver general of King Henry VII's revenues (collected in Meath, Louth, Dublin, Kildare and Drogheda), presented his accounts to barons at the exchequer table. Revenue amounted to £1,110 - just half of that estimated by Hattecliffe as leviable. Commentators suggest the Lord Deputy (Gerald FitzGerald, 8th Earl of Kildare) was taking a substantial share of the revenues. Kildare was renowned for spending the revenues at his pleasure during this time.

== Incumbent ==
- Lord: Henry VII

== Events ==
- April – Gerald FitzGerald, later Earl of Kildare, at the age of 15, played the principal role in the funeral ceremony for Henry VII's eldest son Arthur, Prince of Wales in Worcester Cathedral.

== Deaths ==
- Concobur Ó Caiside
