= Ó Curnín =

Irish family name

Ó Cuirnín was the name of a brehon literary family of Breifne, related to its kings, the O'Rourkes.

The surname is now rendered Cornyn, Courneen, Corneen, Coorneen, Curneen, Curnin, or more rarely, Courtney.

Notable people with the surname include:

- Ó Curnín (monk), a pious sage, died 1258
- Tomás Ó Curnín, ollav of the Fir Brefne, died 1400
- Cormac Ó Curnín, died 1475
- Ruaidrí Ó Curnín, died 1496
- Conor Carragh Ó Curnín, died 1498
- Ferceirtne Ó Curnín, died 1519
- Domhnall Glas Ó Curnín, died 1519
