= 1510 in Ireland =

- Centuries: 14th; 15th; 16th; 17th; 18th
- Decades: 1490s; 1500s; 1510s; 1520s; 1530s
- See also: Other events of 1510; List of years in Ireland

Events from the year 1510 in Ireland.

== Incumbent ==
- Lord: Henry VIII

== Events ==
- An Anglo-Irish army led by Gerald Mór FitzGerald, the 8th earl of Kildare, marches on Thomond, and is met and defeated at Cratloe by an army of the O'Brien, McNamara, Sil-Aedha and Clanrickard clans led by Turlough O'Brien.
