= 1503 in Ireland =

- Centuries: 14th; 15th; 16th; 17th; 18th
- Decades: 1480s; 1490s; 1500s; 1510s; 1520s
- See also: Other events of 1503; List of years in Ireland

Events from the year 1503 in Ireland

== Incumbent ==
- Lord: Henry VII

== Events ==
- Gerald FitzGerald, 9th Earl of Kildare married Elizabeth Zouche, daughter of John Zouche of Codnor

== Deaths ==
- Alexander Plunket
