= 1508 in Ireland =

- Centuries: 14th; 15th; 16th; 17th; 18th
- Decades: 1480s; 1490s; 1500s; 1510s; 1520s
- See also: Other events of 1508; List of years in Ireland

Events from the year 1508 in Ireland.

== Incumbent ==
- Lord: Henry VII

== Events ==
- Dromahair Friary founded by Eóghan O'Rourke, Lord of West Bréifne and Margaret O'Brian of Thomond
- William Preston, 2nd Viscount Gormanston married Eleanor, daughter of Thomas Dowdall, Master of the Rolls
- Christopher Fisher appointed Bishop of Elphin

== Deaths ==
- James Butler, 9th Baron Dunboyne
- Dominick Dubh Lynch, second Mayor of Galway
