= 1518 in Ireland =

- Centuries: 14th; 15th; 16th; 17th; 18th
- Decades: 1490s; 1500s; 1510s; 1520s; 1530s
- See also: Other events of 1518; List of years in Ireland

== Incumbent ==
- Lord: Henry VIII

== Events ==
- June 6: Archduke Ferdinand, son of Philip the Fair of Burgundy and his wife, Joanna the Mad, and grandson to King Ferdinand and Queen Isabella visit Kinsale.
