= Robert de Askeby =

English cleric and Crown official

- Occupation: Lord Chancellor of Ireland

Robert de Askeby (died after 1351) was an English cleric and Crown official who was briefly Lord Chancellor of Ireland.

He is generally thought to have been a nephew or cousin of the Robert de Askeby who was keeper of the Rolls of Parliament in the English Parliament of 1315; this Robert was still living in 1323. The younger Robert took holy orders, and was referred to by the title "Master", which was a sign in that age that he held a University degree. Robert as a Royal clerk seems to have dealt mainly with financial matters. He accounted for moneys received from the merchants of Newcastle-upon-Tyne (where he was parish priest, though probably an absentee), and had the power to search ships in the Port of London (all imported cargoes in the Port were subject to rigorous inspection). He was sent to Ireland as Lord Chancellor in 1341, but recalled the following year. In 1351 he was sent on a diplomatic mission to the Holy See: this appears to have been his last public employment.

As a clergyman he was a noted pluralist, holding prebends in Salisbury and Lincoln, and also numerous livings, including Newcastle, Pagham, Brantingham and Great Stanmore.

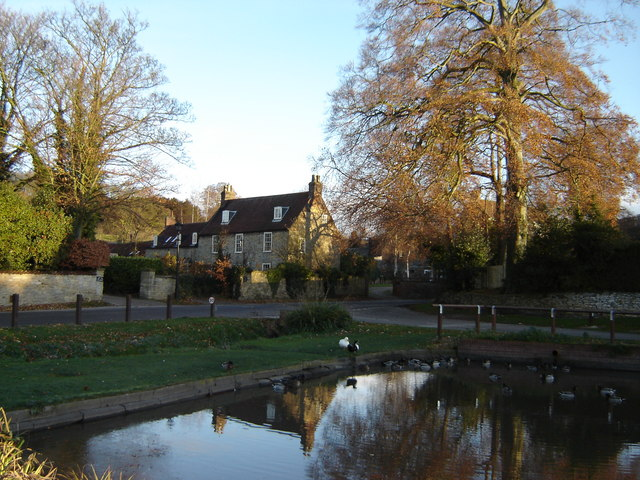
Brantingham, Yorkshire: Askeby was parish priest here

== Sources ==
- Ball, F. Elrington The Judges in Ireland 1221-1921 London John Murray 1926
- Burke, Oliver The History of the Lord Chancellors of Ireland from A.D.1186 to A.D 1874 Dublin E. Ponsonby 1874
- Richardson, H.G. and Sayles, George "The King's Ministers in Parliament 1272-1377" The English Historical Review Vol. 47 (1932)
