= Ralph de Norwich =

English-born cleric, judge and Crown servant

Ralph de Norwich (c.1180–1259) was an English-born cleric, judge and Crown servant to King John and King Henry III, much of whose career was spent in Ireland, where he held office as Lord Chancellor of Ireland for several years. He was elected Archbishop of Dublin in 1256, but his election was vetoed by the Pope, on the grounds that despite his clerical office he was essentially a secular official, and too devoted to the King's interests to be a good servant of the Pope.

== Early career ==
He was born in Norwich, and is thought to have come from a prosperous middle-class family. The later references to him as "Master Ralph" are evidence that he had a University degree. He took holy orders, but it was universally agreed in his own lifetime that he was not a particularly devout man, being "sumptuous" in his lifestyle and wholly secular in his outlook.

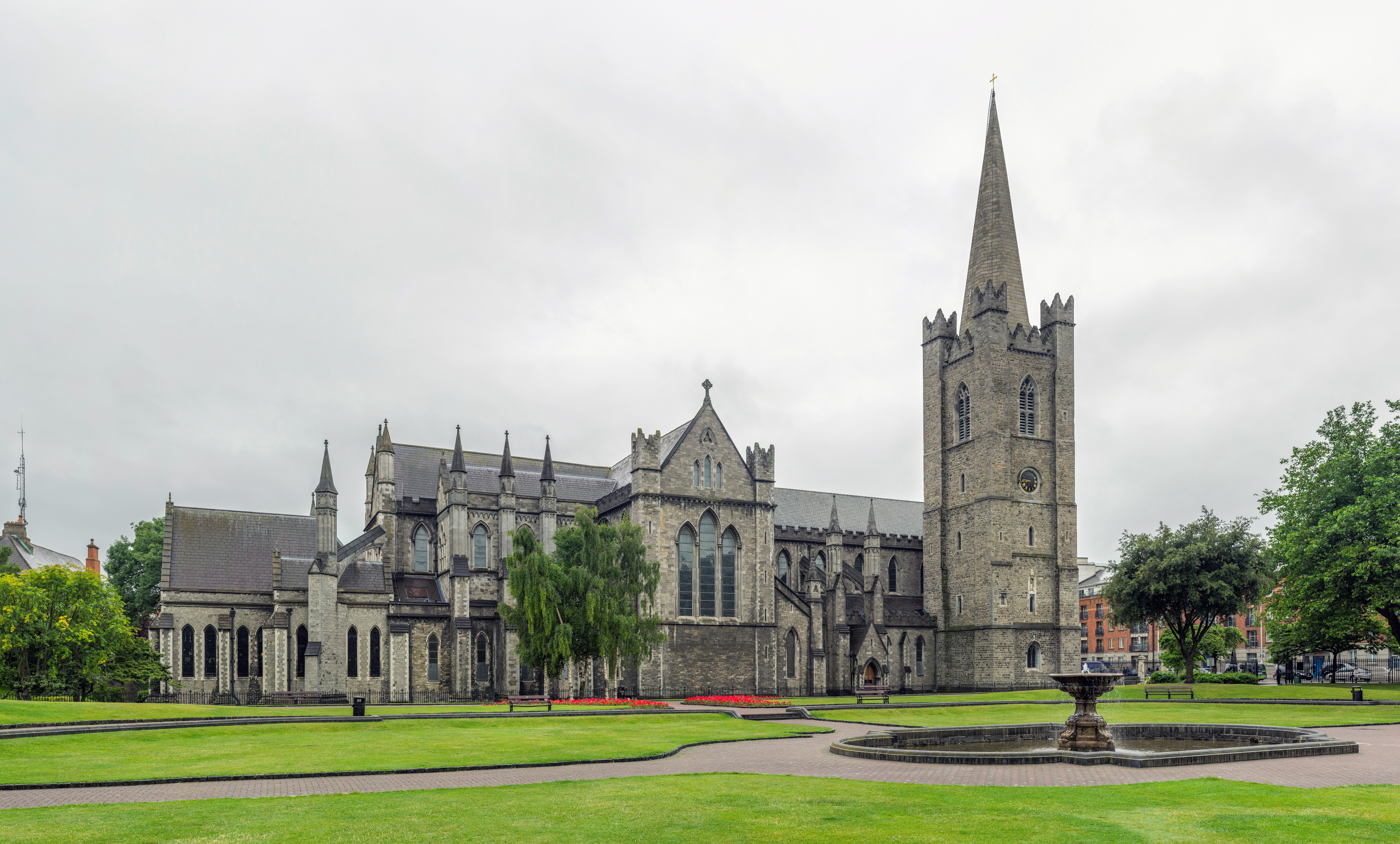
St. Patrick's Cathedral, Dublin: Ralph was a Canon here

He is first heard of as a Crown official in 1214. He went to Ireland in 1216, when he was described by the King as "our clerk". He was sent by the Crown with a message to the Justiciar of Ireland, Geoffrey de Marisco, and returned to England with Geoffrey's reply. Over the next decade, he crossed the Irish Sea at least six times on Crown business. He held a variety of offices, including King's Messenger and official of the Exchequer of Ireland. He was given the role of managing the English wool duties, and was given custody of the estates of a number of "great lords". His position at Court led to his receiving several benefices in England, and a canonry of St. Patrick's Cathedral, Dublin in 1227. On the other hand, the King made him relinquish a benefice in the Diocese of Meath, on the ground that the King had never approved the election of Geoffrey de Cusack, the Bishop who granted it. In 1227 Ralph received the temporalities of the Diocese of Emly, the See then being subject of a disputed election, with instructions to use them to further the King's interests in the appointment of the new Bishop of Emly, for which office John Collingham, the Chancellor of Emly Cathedral, was eventually chosen. Ralph spent more and more time in Ireland, where he acquired lands.

== Finance official ==
In 1229 he was one of a number of senior officials who advised the Irish bishops and clergy on levying the tax or "aid" of one-sixteenth on ecclesiastical benefices. The tax was highly successful, and in 1230 the Irish administration sent the King 2000 marks (a very large sum for the time, especially in Ireland, which was chronically short of money) collected by the Justiciar, Richard Mór de Burgh, from the proceeds. In 1231 Ralph's death was widely but wrongly reported, notably in the Annals of Dunstable. The reports gained so much credence that to prevent the sequestration of his Irish estates, the King issued a writ proclaiming that he was alive and well.

== Lord Chancellor ==
He had considerable judicial experience in England, being first appointed one of the justices for the Jews in 1227, then a judge of the Court of King's Bench c. 1230–1234, and finally an itinerant justice in about 1235. No doubt due to his long experience as a judge he was appointed Lord Chancellor of Ireland in 1249, with a salary of 60 marks a year, until more generous provision could be made. As Lord Chancellor he is said to have exercised great influence over the itinerant justices.

== Failure to become Archbishop of Dublin ==
In 1256, on the death of Archbishop Luke, Ralph was elected by his fellow canons of St Patrick's Cathedral (this was the normal procedure at the time) to succeed him as Archbishop of Dublin. The King was agreeable, but Pope Alexander IV, whose relationship with King Henry was already strained, had received unfavourable reports of Ralph's character from the English proctors at the Papal Court and rejected the appointment. His reasons were that despite his clerical offices Ralph lived a purely secular life, and that he was entirely devoted to the King's interests. The Pope strongly criticised the electors for their choice. This low opinion of Ralph is echoed by the chronicler Matthew Paris, who described him as witty and sumptuous in his lifestyle, and more suited to life at the King's Court than to a hall of learning. Paris, like the Pope, condemned the election to high clerical office of a man who was "wholly secular" and "occupied entirely with the custody of the King's Irish Exchequer". Fulk Basset (also known as Fulk de Sandford) became Archbishop instead.

In 1256 Ralph surrendered the Great Seal of Ireland to the future King Edward I, and returned to England. He was acting as an itinerant justice again in 1258, and apparently died the following year.

== Sources ==
- Ball, F. Elrington The Judges in Ireland 1221-1921 London John Murray 1926
- Beresford, David "Norwich, Ralph of" Cambridge Dictionary of National Biography 2009
- Foss, Edward The Judges of England London Longman Brown Green and Longmans 1848
- Lee, Sidney, ed. (1895). "Norwich, Ralph de" . Dictionary of National Biography. Vol. 41. London: Smith, Elder & Co.
- Smyth, Constantine Joseph Chronicle of the Law Officers of Ireland London Butterworths 1839
- Turner, Ralph Judges, Administrators and the Common Law in Angevin England Hambledon Press 1994
