= Rathmacknee Castle =

- Caisleán Ráth Mhac nAodha (Irish)
- Rathmacnee Castle
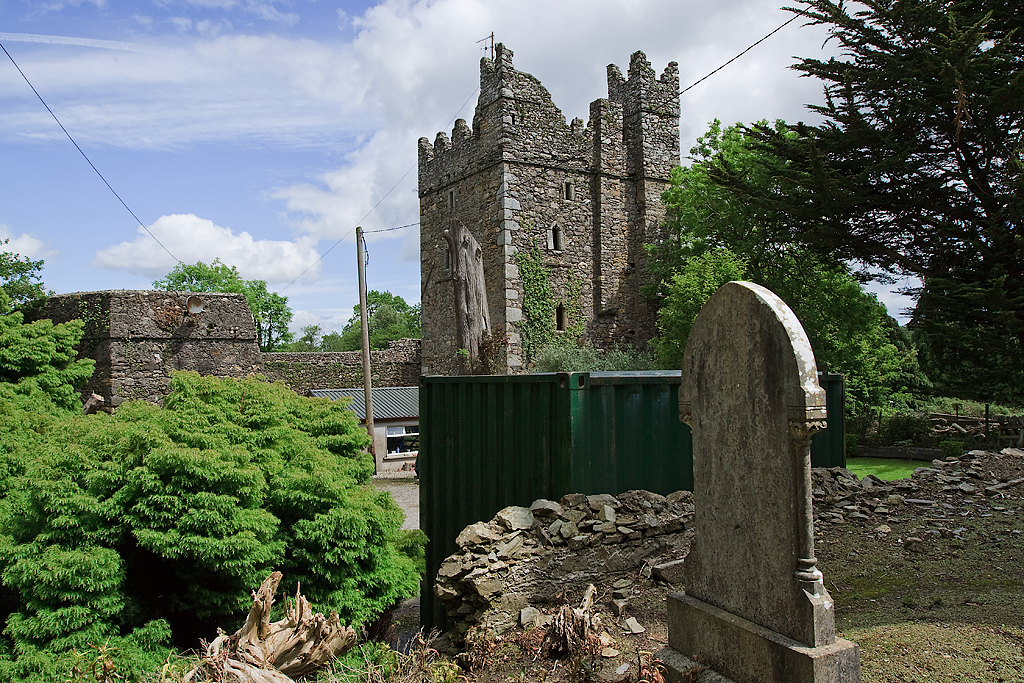

- Location within Ireland
- 52.269301°N 6.490495°W
- Type: tower house
- Location: Rathmacknee Great, Piercestown, County Wexford, Ireland

History
- Built: late 15th century

Site notes
- Area: Piercestown region
- Owner: State

National monument of Ireland
- Official name: Rathmackee Castle
- Reference no.: 434

Rathmacknee Castle is a tower house and National Monument located in County Wexford, Ireland.

== Location ==
Rathmacknee Castle is located in southeast County Wexford, 6.3 km (3.9 mi) west of Rosslare.

== History ==
Rathmacknee Castle is believed to have been built by John Rosseter (Rossiter, Rositer, Rosceter) who was made seneschal of the Liberty of Wexford c. 1415. Other accounts associate its construction with his grandson Thomas Rossiter, seneschal in 1493. The Rossiters remained Catholic after the Reformation but stayed loyal to the monarchy and continued to hold their lands. Col. Thomas Rosseter fought against Oliver Cromwell at Wexford in the Irish Confederate Wars and the castle and lands were confiscated in 1654. The castle remained occupied until the 1760s. In the 19th century it was restored by its owner, Hamilton Knox Grogan Morgan.

== Building ==
Rathmacknee is a tower house or caiseal, located in the southeast corner of a five-sided bawn, with a bartizan in the bawn wall.

The tower is five storeys high and the parapet has Irish crenellations.

The tower's entrance has a drawbar-slot, a murder-hole and stairs. The upper rooms contain fireplaces, vaulted ceilings and garderobes.

The tower was located near a ford and a holy well dedicated to St Martin. A church and graveyard stood to the south and protective earthworks to the north.
