= 1514 in Ireland =

- Centuries: 14th; 15th; 16th; 17th; 18th
- Decades: 1490s; 1500s; 1510s; 1520s; 1530s
- See also: Other events of 1514; List of years in Ireland

Events from the year 1514 in Ireland.

== Incumbent ==
- Lord: Henry VIII

== Births ==
- November 27 – Peter Carew, English adventurer in Ireland (b. 1514?)
