= 1484 in Ireland =

- Centuries: 13th; 14th; 15th; 16th; 17th
- Decades: 1460s; 1470s; 1480s; 1490s; 1500s
- See also: Other events of 1484; List of years in Ireland

Events from the year 1484 in Ireland.

== Incumbent ==
- Lord: Richard III

== Events ==
- 14 June – Walter Fitzsimon is appointed Archbishop of Dublin, an office which he will hold until his death in 1511.
- July–August – Gearóid Mór FitzGerald, 8th Earl of Kildare, Lord Deputy of Ireland, attends the English court.
- 20 August – Giolla Pádraig (son of Éamonn mac Thomáis Óig, Mág Uidhir), tánaiste of Fir Manach, is killed by his five brothers, leading to dynastic tension.
- 21 August – John de la Pole, 1st Earl of Lincoln, is appointed Lieutenant in Ireland by his uncle Richard III of England.
- September – Thomás Bairéad, Bishop of Annaghdown, is commissioned by the King to treat with Conn mac Enri Ó Néill, lord of Tír Eógain, and Hiberno-Normans.
- 28 September – St. Nicholas' Church, Galway, is raised to the status of a collegiate church by Donatus Ó Muireadhaigh, Archbishop of Tuam.
- 15 October – Great Council (sitting of the Parliament of Ireland) at Naas.
- November – Réamonn mac Mathghamhna, king of Airgíalla, dies in captivity at Drogheda and is succeeded by his nephew Aodh Óg.
- 15 December – The city of Galway is granted a royal charter and mayoralty by Richard III of England.
- An Irish province of the Dominican Order is established.
