= 1495 in Ireland =

- Centuries: 13th; 14th; 15th; 16th; 17th
- Decades: 1470s; 1480s; 1490s; 1500s; 1510s
- See also: Other events of 1495; List of years in Ireland

Events from the year 1495 in Ireland.

== Incumbent ==
- Lord: Henry VII

== Events ==
- Poynings' Law comes into effect, placing the Parliament of Ireland under the authority of the Parliament of England.
- The English Treason Act 1351 is extended to Ireland.
- July – Perkin Warbeck, having failed to land in Kent in support of his claim to the English crown, retreats to Ireland before proceeding to Scotland. Walter St. Lawrence plays an active part in the defence of Dublin.
- Rebellion in Kildare in 1495 by Yorkist sympathizers led James Kildare
- The agreed historic end of the era of Medieval Ireland

== Deaths ==
- Owen Caech Ó Dubhda, Chief of the Name and Lord of Tireragh.
- 15 February - Feidhlimidh mac Tomás Óg Mág Samhradháin.
