= Ruaidrí Ó Curnín =

Irish poet

- Died: 1496
- Writing career
- Genre: Poetry

Ruaidrí Ó Curnín (died 1496) was an Irish poet.

Ó Curnín was a member of a brehon literary family of Breifne.

The Annals of the Four Masters record his death, sub anno 1496:

- O'Cuirnin (Rory) ... died.

== See also ==
- Cormac Ó Curnín, died 1474
- Conor Carragh Ó Curnín, died 1498
- Ferceirtne Ó Curnín, died 1519
- Domhnall Glas Ó Curnín, died 1519
