= 1491 in Ireland =

- Centuries: 13th; 14th; 15th; 16th; 17th
- Decades: 1470s; 1480s; 1490s; 1500s; 1510s
- See also: Other events of 1491; List of years in Ireland

Events from the year 1491 in Ireland.

== Incumbent ==
- Lord: Henry VII

== Events ==
- Summer/autumn – continuous rainfall causes the grain crops to fail throughout Ireland, leading to this being called the "dismal year".
- November – pretender to the English throne Perkin Warbeck arrives in Cork. He wins some support for his cause from James FitzGerald, 8th Earl of Desmond, but Henry VII of England sends James Ormonde with troops to defend the territory and suspends Desmond's cousin, Gerald Mór FitzGerald, 8th Earl of Kildare, from his office of Deputy Lieutenant of Ireland for being implicated.

== Births ==
- June 28 – Henry VIII, King of Ireland (d. 1547)
