= 1483 in Ireland =

- Centuries: 13th; 14th; 15th; 16th; 17th
- Decades: 1460s; 1470s; 1480s; 1490s; 1500s
- See also: Other events of 1483; List of years in Ireland

Events from the year 1483 in Ireland.

== Incumbent ==
- Lord: Edward IV (until 9 April), Edward V (9 April to 26 June), then Richard III

== Events ==
- May – Robert St Lawrence, 3rd Baron Howth appointed Lord Chancellor of Ireland (died a few months later)

== Deaths ==
Germyn Lynch, a well known Galway merchant.
