= 1493 in Ireland =

- Centuries: 13th; 14th; 15th; 16th; 17th
- Decades: 1470s; 1480s; 1490s; 1500s; 1510s
- See also: Other events of 1493; List of years in Ireland

Events from the year 1493 in Ireland.

== Incumbent ==
- Lord: Henry VII

== Events ==
- Rathmacknee Castle is, by some accounts, built by Thomas Rossiter, seneschal of the Liberty of Wexford.
- First recorded reference to the River Poddle in Dublin.

== Deaths ==
- Teige Mac Con Midhe, Irish poet and writer
