= 1507 in Ireland =

- Centuries: 14th; 15th; 16th; 17th; 18th
- Decades: 1480s; 1490s; 1500s; 1510s; 1520s
- See also: Other events of 1507; List of years in Ireland

Events from the year 1507 in Ireland.

== Incumbent ==
- Lord: Henry VII

== Events ==
- Stephen Lynch fitz Dominick Dubh becomes the 23rd Mayor of Galway

== Deaths ==
- July 12 - Fedlim Mac Giolla Seanáin, a Brehon lawyer and Canon lawyer.
- November 20 – Arthur Lynch, 22nd Mayor of Galway, drowned.
