= 1506 in Ireland =

- Centuries: 14th; 15th; 16th; 17th; 18th
- Decades: 1480s; 1490s; 1500s; 1510s; 1520s
- See also: Other events of 1506; List of years in Ireland

Events from the year 1506 in Ireland.

== Incumbent ==
- Lord: Henry VII

== Events ==
- First bridge at O'Brien's Bridge, County Clare founded by Turlough O'Brien

== Deaths ==
- Katherine Fitzgerald, Lady of Hy-Carbery, Castle Salem, Cork
- John Payne, Bishop of Meath
