= 1515 in Ireland =

- Centuries: 14th; 15th; 16th; 17th; 18th
- Decades: 1490s; 1500s; 1510s; 1520s; 1530s
- See also: Other events of 1515; List of years in Ireland

Events from the year 1515 in Ireland.

== Incumbent ==
- Lord: Henry VIII

== Births ==
- Margaret Ball, died of deprivation in the dungeons of Dublin Castle, beatified in 1992 (d. 1584)

== Deaths ==
- August 3 – Thomas Butler, 7th Earl of Ormonde (b. c. 1450)
