= Farrell Mac an Ruagaire =

Farrell Mac an Ruagaire, Irish anchorite, died 1488.

The Annals of the Four Masters contain the only known reference to Farrell, sub anno 1488:

Farrell Mac-an-Ruagaire died. This Farrell took food like others for the space of twenty years, but had not the evacuation of his body during this time.

— O'Donovan, John, ed. (1856). Annála Rioghachta Éireann. Annals of the Kingdom of Ireland by the Four Masters ... with a Translation and Copious Notes. 7 vols. Translated by O'Donovan (2nd ed.). Dublin: Royal Irish Academy. s.a.1488. CELT editions. Full scans at Internet Archive: Vol. 1; Vol. 2; Vol. 3; Vol. 4; Vol. 5; Vol. 6; Indices.
