= James Ormond (administrator) =

Lord Treasurer of Ireland (died 1497)

Sir James Ormond
- Died: 17 July 1497; Kilkenny, Ireland
- Father: John Butler, 6th Earl of Ormond
- Mother: Reynalda O'Brien

Sir James Ormond alias Butler (died 17 July 1497) was the son of John Butler, 6th Earl of Ormond. He was Lord Treasurer of Ireland from 1492 to 1494, and helped to defend the Lordship of Ireland against the forces of Perkin Warbeck. He was murdered by Sir Piers Butler on 17 July 1497. Piers would later hold the title of Earl of Ormond.

== Family ==
James Ormond was the eldest of three sons of John Butler, 6th Earl of Ormond (d. 14 October 1476), by his mistress Reynalda O'Brien, daughter of Turlogh "The Brown" O'Brien, King of Thomond. In 1458 one of his younger brothers, John Ormond (d. 5 October 1503) married the heiress Joan Chaworth (d.1507), by whom he had three daughters. Nothing is known of his other younger brother, Edward Ormond, apart from his name.

== Career ==
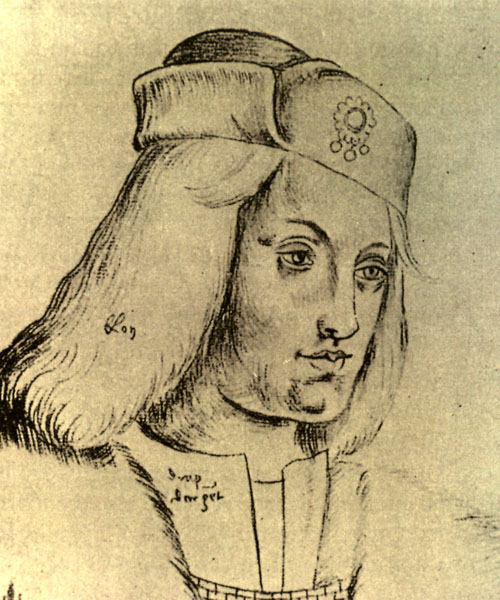
Drawing of the Pretender Perkin Warbeck, against whom Sir James Ormond defended Ireland

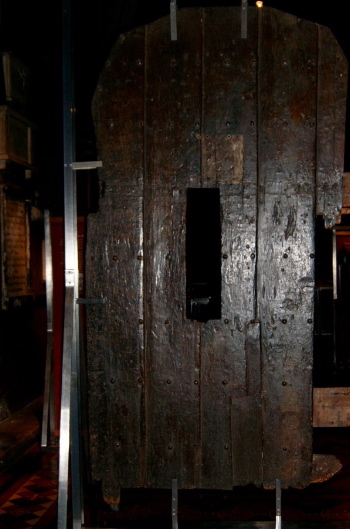
The 'door of reconciliation' in St Patrick's Cathedral, Dublin, through which Ormond and Kildare shook hands

He is thought to have been raised at court by his uncle, Thomas Butler, 7th Earl of Ormond. In June 1486 he was admitted to Lincoln's Inn. In 1487 his uncle, the 7th Earl, appointed him as his deputy in Ireland after the death of Sir James Butler of Polestown; however the appointment was disputed by the latter's son, Sir Piers Butler.

In December 1491 Ormond was sent by King Henry VII of England in company with Thomas Garth and 200 soldiers to defend the interests of the Crown against the pretender Perkin Warbeck, and was appointed Governor of both Kilkenny and Tipperary. In June 1492, having become one of Henry VII's councillors, he succeeded Rowland FitzEustace, 1st Baron Portlester as Lord High Treasurer of Ireland, and he and Walter Fitzsimons, Archbishop of Dublin, were appointed jointly as governors of Ireland, to replace Gerald FitzGerald, 8th Earl of Kildare. The Earl's dismissal 'stoked the old Butler–Fitzgerald feud' until, in the early summer of 1493, Ormond and Kildare were reconciled in St Patrick's Cathedral, where Ormond had sought refuge, by shaking hands 'through a hole cut in the chapter house door'. (Note: The incident provides a false etymology of the expression to "chance one's arm".)

To forestall a second invasion by Perkin Warbeck, Henry VII sent forces to Ireland, and in September 1493 replaced Ormond and Fitzsimons as joint governors by Viscount Gormanston. Ormond and other prominent Irish officials spent the winter of 1493 in England at Henry VII's court preparing to defend Ireland against Warbeck. The King appointed Sir Edward Poynings as Deputy Lieutenant of Ireland, and he sailed for Ireland with a force of 653 soldiers. Ormond was replaced as Lord Treasurer by Sir Hugh Conway, but in recompense was granted several manors by the King, and returned to Ireland in June 1494. He was appointed Constable of Limerick Castle, and worked closely with Poynings, accompanying him on an expedition to Ulster in November 1494. In February 1495 the Earl of Kildare was arrested for treason. His brother seized Carlow Castle, which Poynings and Ormond besieged in the spring and retook in July. Warbeck and Desmond then laid siege to Waterford. Ormond brought troops to Waterford, and shortly thereafter Warbeck's support in Ireland collapsed. Sir Edward Poynings was recalled to England, together with most of his forces, and as a result, Ormond assumed a greater role in Irish military affairs.

However, in the spring of 1496, Henry VII decided to restore the Earl of Kildare as Governor, and Ormond was summoned to England in July of that year for a formal reconciliation between the Earl of Ormond and the Earl of Kildare and their supporters. The English troops which Ormond had commanded in Ireland were ordered back to England, and according to Ellis, 'Kildare favoured Ormond's rival, Piers Butler'. Butler alleged that Ormand was claiming to be the rightful Earl of Ormond, and plotting with Perkin Warbeck. Allegations of this nature prompted Henry VII to summon Ormond to England early in 1497 and again in May. However, Ormond ignored both summonses, and was slain by his rival and kinsman Sir Piers Butler on 17 July 1497 'in a kind of impromptu duel near Kilkenny'.

His brothers were John Ormond, esquire, Sir William Butler of Gloucestershire, and Edward Ormond. James and his brother John were born in Alfreton, Derbyshire. They were the grandsons of the Irish King Turlogh The Brown O'Brien, King of Thomond (d.1460). He was knighted in 1493 by King Henry VII of England for services in battle for the Tudor cause. He held lands in Wiltshire. The year before his murder he was made an Irish peer by Henry VII. He was hailed as Earl of Ormond by the Irish, but never attained that title.
