= 1504 in Ireland =

- Centuries: 14th; 15th; 16th; 17th; 18th
- Decades: 1480s; 1490s; 1500s; 1510s; 1520s
- See also: Other events of 1504; List of years in Ireland

Events from the year 1504 in Ireland.

== Incumbent ==
- Lord: Henry VII

== Events ==
- August 19 – Battle of Knockdoe: Gearóid Mór FitzGerald, 8th Earl of Kildare, Lord Deputy of Ireland, defeats Ulick Fionn Burke, the Clanricarde.
- First known record of a Solicitor-General for Ireland.
