= Adam de Lymbergh =

English Crown official and judge

Adam de Lymbergh (died 1339) was an English Crown official and judge of the early fourteenth century, who served two Kings with distinction. He was Lord Chancellor of Ireland, a Baron of the Exchequer and Lord Keeper of the Privy Seal.

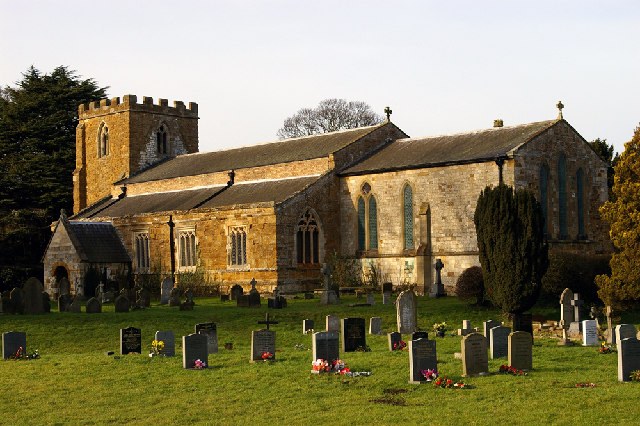
St Peter's Church, Great Limber, Adam's probable birthplace

He was born in Lincolnshire, where he was a substantial landowner with estates at Torksey and Navenby; his name probably derives from the village of Great Limber in the same county.

He was in holy orders: he became prebendary of Stafford in 1312, and held at least four livings: Rye, Sussex, Berkswell, Warwickshire and two parishes in Lincolnshire itself, Firsby and Algakirk. He never seems to have sought higher clerical rank, despite his eminence as a judge. He was apparently attached to the household of John Sandale, Bishop of Winchester, and helped to complete an inventory of his possessions on his death in 1319.

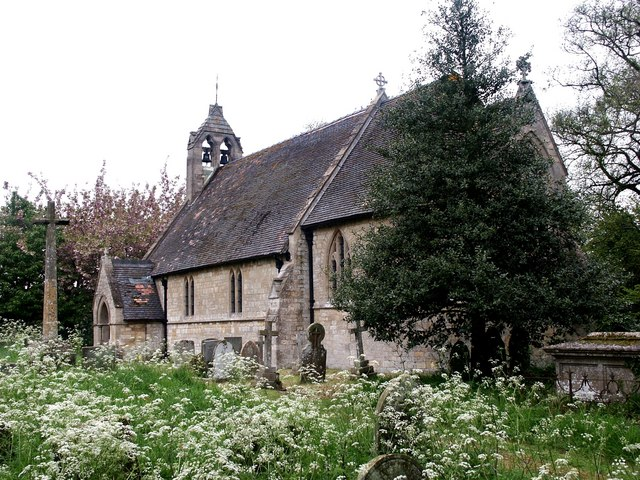
Saint Andrew's Church, Firsby, Lincolnshire: Adam was the parish priest of Frisby from 1310

He was a valued Crown official who served in several positions of trust from early in the reign of Edward II. He was appointed a Remembrancer of the Exchequer (the official who drew up a memorandum of each case for the Court to consider) in 1311, and the records show that he was exceptionally diligent in performing his duties.

He was appointed Constable of Bordeaux, then an English possession, in 1322, and served for three or four years. Two petitions of his to the King and Council survive from about 1330 when his accounts were being audited. The first requests that the Exchequer allow him his costs of travelling to Bordeaux, and of his installation as Constable. The second petition, after referring to the extreme difficulties he had encountered as Constable, asks for his accounts to be dealt with at once so that he might be repaid his expenses. King Edward III, who like his father had high regard for Adam, granted both petitions.

In 1323 he was appointed Lord Keeper of the Privy Seal, one of the first recorded holders of the office.Edward III appointed him Lord Chancellor of Ireland in 1330, and he served in that office for four years. He then returned to England and was appointed a Baron of the Exchequer, in which capacity he served until his death in 1339; he never returned to Ireland. In his will of 1338 he made a bequest to the Austin Friars at Lincoln.

As he was by virtue of his calling a celibate, his substantial estates in Lincolnshire were inherited by his sister Matilda.

== Sources ==
- Ball, F. Elrington The Judges in Ireland 1221-1921 London John Murray 1926
- Burke, Oliver The History of the Lord Chancellors of Ireland from A.D. 1186 to A.D. 1874 Dublin E. Ponsonby 1874
- Foss, Edward The Judges of England London Longman Green Brown and Longmans 1851
- National Archives SC/8/60/2951 and SC/8/60/2952 "Petitions of Adam de Lymbergh, former Constable of Bordeaux"
- Page, William, Editor A History of the County of Lincoln 2 Volumes 1906
