= John Lynch (mayor) =

John Lynch, (a.k.a. John Lynch fitz John), fifth Mayor of Galway, 1489–1490.

Believed to be a brother of the first two mayors, little is known of Lynch's term of office. He was married to Secilia Stywyn, and the couple had at least five children: Henry, Secilia, Ambrose, Sander and Balthasser. He was alive as late as 1498, and his will requested that his wife and his brother Nicholas be his executors, while My body to be buried in the Chapel of the Blessed Virgin Mary in the Collegiate Church of Galway.

Civic offices
Preceded by Geoffrey Lynch	Mayor of Galway; 1489–1490	Succeeded by Robuck Lynch
