= Fedlim Mac Giolla Seanáin =

Fedlim Maguinnsenain (died 12 July 1507) was a Brehon lawyer and Canon lawyer.

Maguinnsenain was a member of an Irish brehon family of south Ulster and north Leinster, originally from what is now County Tyrone.

The Annals of the Four Masters give his obituary sub anno 1507:

- Felim Maguinnsenain, Official of Tirconnell, a select Brehon, an ecclesiastic eminent for piety and benevolent deeds, died on the 12th of July.

The surname is now rendered in English as Nugent.
