= Hilaire Penet =

French composer

Hilaire Penet (born 1501?) was a French composer of the Renaissance, who worked for at least the earlier part of his life in Rome.

== Life and works ==
Unusually for a Renaissance composer, more is known of his earlier life than his later; indeed nothing at all is known of him after 1520. He was probably born in 1501, since his age is given as 14 in a document of 1515, and he was probably born near Poitiers. He served as a singer in the papal chapel from 1514, when he arrived there in the care of Carpentras, until 1520 when he left never to return. Since much of his music was published in the 1530s and later, he may have still been alive then and working elsewhere; presumably had he been still working in association with the papal chapel, there would be records of his employment.

Penet is most famous as the composer of Descendit angelus Domini, a four-voice motet which was used both by Palestrina and Costanzo Porta as source material for mass composition. The motet circulated widely in Europe and apparently was quite popular; Penet can be seen as a kind of Renaissance one-hit wonder on the strength and popularity of this refined, elegant composition. He also wrote two settings of the Magnificat which have survived, another motet (Virgo prudentissima), as well as a handful of secular chansons, all of which are settings of current popular tunes.

== References and further reading ==
- Article "Hilaire Penet," in The New Grove Dictionary of Music and Musicians, ed. Stanley Sadie. 20 vol. London, Macmillan Publishers Ltd., 1980. ISBN 1-56159-174-2
- Gustave Reese, Music in the Renaissance. New York, W.W. Norton & Co., 1954. ISBN 0-393-09530-4

== Recording ==
- Pomerium, Musical Book of Hours. Archiv 289 457 586-2. Contains the five-voice motet Virgo prudentissima, published in 1534.
