= Walter Fitzsimon =

Irish archbishop and Lord Chancellor

- Born: Dublin
- Died: 1511; Ireland
- Occupations: Irish statesman and cleric
- Known for: Lord Chancellor of Ireland from 1496–98

Walter Fitzsimons (died 1511) was a statesman and cleric in Ireland in the reign of Henry VII, who held the offices of Archbishop of Dublin and Lord Chancellor of Ireland.

== Biography ==
He was born in Dublin, the son of Robert Fitzsimon and his wife Janet Cusack. He had close links to the Anglo-Irish nobility through his sister Alison, who married as his third wife Nicholas St Lawrence, 4th Baron Howth; after Lord Howth's death, Alison remarried into the influential Plunkett family. It is unclear whether he was related to Walter Fitz-Symond, described as a "gentleman of Dublin", who in 1465/6 was threatened with a lawsuit by two London merchants to whom he acknowledged that he was in debt for £40. It is interesting that one of his co-defendants was the then Archbishop, Michael Tregury.

Fitzsimon was appointed precentor of St Patrick's Cathedral in 1476, and represented the Cathedral Chapter in the Parliament of 1478. He was also Vicar-General of the Diocese. He was consecrated Archbishop of Dublin in 1484. He was the first Archbishop to be consecrated in St Patrick's Cathedral. Having accepted the promotion without royal consent, he was required to obtain a pardon. He was Lord Deputy of Ireland 1492–93 and Lord Chancellor of Ireland 1496–98. He died at Finglas in 1511.

== Career ==
Like most of the Anglo-Irish nobility (except his brother-in-law, Lord Howth) he made the mistake of supporting the claim of the pretender Lambert Simnel to the English throne, and was present at his coronation as "King Edward VI" in Christchurch Cathedral, Dublin, although it is unclear if he officiated. After the crushing of Simnel's cause at the Battle of Stoke Field, Fitzsimon was pardoned and played a prominent part in the ceremony by which the Irish nobles expiated their treason. Soon afterwards he quarrelled with the Earl of Kildare, the dominant figure in Irish politics, and the moving force behind the Simnel rebellion, and with Kildare's father-in-law, Lord Portlester, whom he accused of encroaching on the temporalities of the Archdiocese. Thereafter the Archbishop was considered a reliable supporter of the Tudor dynasty. It may well have been at least partly his influence which prevented a later pretender, Perkin Warbeck, from gaining significant support in Ireland.

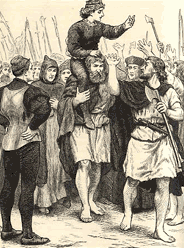
Lambert Simnel in Ireland

=== Lord Deputy ===
In 1492 he became Lord Deputy of Ireland and convened a Parliament at Dublin which was largely devoted to annulling measures previously taken against him by his principal political opponent, Baron Portlester. However, Portlester and Kildare were still very powerful, and their hostility led to Fitzsimon's resignation from the Deputyship in September 1493. He was eventually reconciled with Kildare at the King's instigation, as Henry had come to recognise that Kildare was indispensable in the Government of Ireland.

The Archbishop saw himself as a social reformer, and persuaded the King to take stern action against beggars: he argued that most of them were perfectly well able to work but preferred to live on charity: "such as live in sloth and indolence on account of the great plenty of all kinds of provisions which this land naturally produces". The King agreed, and orders were accordingly issued that no one be permitted to beg without a certificate from the appropriate local authority. Further, a workhouse was to be built in every parish for vagabonds to work in. At the same time he urged that the younger sons of the nobility, whom he denounced for their incorrigible idleness, should be encouraged to learn a useful trade rather than live off their parents.

=== Lord Chancellor ===
He was Lord Chancellor of Ireland from 1496 to 1498; there is some doubt as to whether he resumed the office at a later date. O'Flanagan states that he was a diligent Chancellor, but this did not lead him to neglect his duties as Archbishop. He held a synod in Dublin in 1494. In 1497 he granted John Alleyne, the Dean of St Patrick's Cathedral, licence to build a hospital at Kevin Street for the poor people of Dublin, who must, however, be able to satisfy the Dean that they were good Catholics of blameless life and of English origin. He made some efforts to revive the moribund Medieval University of Dublin (not to be confused with Trinity College, Dublin), by imposing a levy on the clergy to provide salaries for the lecturers.

In his later years, he spent much of his time at the English Court, and despite his previous support for Lambert Simnel he seems to have enjoyed the complete trust of King Henry VII, who was not by nature or experience a trustful man. O'Flanagan tells the story that the King asked Fitzsimon what he thought of a recent sermon preached by one of the Royal chaplains: the Archbishop said frankly that it was unduly flattering of the King. The King, highly amused, replied that this was his opinion also.

== Character ==
Early accounts call him a learned philosopher, and a man of gravity and commanding aspect. Ball describes him as a man of remarkable strength of mind and body and one of the most learned men of his time. O'Flanagan calls him a man of great gravity and learning.

== See also ==
- Symon Semeonis

Catholic Church titles
Preceded by John Walton	Archbishop of Dublin; 1484–1511	Succeeded by William Rokeby
Political offices
Preceded by Henry Deane	Lord Chancellor of Ireland; 1496–1498	Succeeded by William Rokeby
