= 1494 in Ireland =

- Centuries: 13th; 14th; 15th; 16th; 17th
- Decades: 1470s; 1480s; 1490s; 1500s; 1510s
- See also: Other events of 1494; List of years in Ireland

The following events occurred in Ireland in the year 1494.

== Incumbent ==
- Lord: Henry VII

== Events ==
- September 13 – Henry Deane appointed Lord Chancellor of Ireland under Edward Poynings
- October 13 – Edward Poynings arrives at Howth with 1,000 men.
- December 1 – Edward Poynings assembles the Parliament of Ireland in Drogheda to tell it that it is thereafter to be placed under the authority of the Privy Council of England by Poynings' Law (1495).
- Hugh Conway was created Lord Treasurer of Ireland by King Henry VII of England
