= 1513 in Ireland =

- Centuries: 14th; 15th; 16th; 17th; 18th
- Decades: 1490s; 1500s; 1510s; 1520s; 1530s
- See also: Other events of 1513; List of years in Ireland

Events from the year 1513 in Ireland.

== Incumbent ==
- Lord: Henry VIII

== Events ==
- c. September – Gerald FitzGerald, 9th Earl of Kildare becomes Earl, Lord Lieutenant of Ireland, and Lord Justice following the death of his father Gearóid Mór FitzGerald, 8th Earl of Kildare.
- Late – Irish chiefs ravage part of The Pale.
- William Rokeby, Primate of Ireland appointed Lord Chancellor of Ireland.

== Births ==
- Thomas FitzGerald, 10th Earl of Kildare (d. 1537)

== Deaths ==
- c. September – Gearóid Mór FitzGerald, 8th Earl of Kildare, peer and Lord Lieutenant of Ireland.
