= 1509 in Ireland =

- Centuries: 14th; 15th; 16th; 17th; 18th
- Decades: 1480s; 1490s; 1500s; 1510s; 1520s
- See also: Other events of 1509; List of years in Ireland

Events from the year 1509 in Ireland.

== Incumbent ==
- Lord: Henry VII (until 21 April), then Henry VIII

== Deaths ==
- Ulick Fionn Burke, 6th Lord of Clanricarde
- Clement Fitzleones, an Irish lawyer and judge
