= 1487 in Ireland =

- Centuries: 13th; 14th; 15th; 16th; 17th
- Decades: 1460s; 1470s; 1480s; 1490s; 1500s
- See also: Other events of 1487; List of years in Ireland

Events from the year 1487 in Ireland.

== Incumbent ==
- Lord: Henry VII

== Events ==
- May 24 – Lambert Simnel is crowned "King Edward VI" in Christ Church Cathedral, Dublin.

== Births ==
- Gerald FitzGerald, 9th Earl of Kildare (d. 1534)

== Deaths ==
- Sigraid Ó Maolconaire, Irish Ruler.
- James FitzGerald, 8th Earl of Desmond, murdered.
