= Tadhg Mac Cárthaigh =

Irish bishop

Blessed Tadhg Mac Cárthaigh "Thaddeus McCarthy"
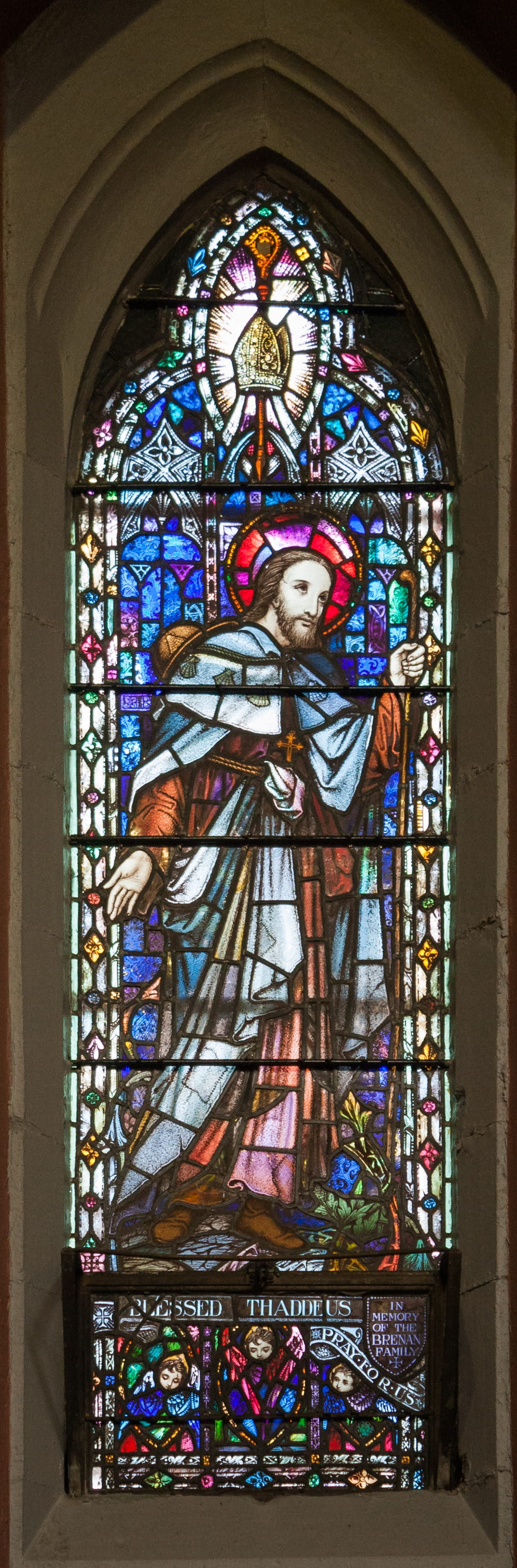
- Stained glass window of Blessed Thaddeus in Saints Peter and Paul's Church, Cork, created by Earley and Company

Bishop
- Born: c. 1455 Innishannon, County Cork
- Died: 25 October 1492 (aged 36–37) Ivrea
- Venerated in: Roman Catholic Church
- Beatified: 26 August 1895 by Pope Leo XIII
- Major shrine: Cathedral of Ivrea, Cathedral of Saint Mary and Saint Anne in Cork, Ireland, Cathedral of Saint Colman, Cobh, Ireland, Church of Saint Mary, Youghal, Ireland
- Feast: 25 October

Tadhg Mac Cárthaigh (Latinised and anglicised Thaddeus McCarthy) c. 1455 – 25 October 1492, was an Irish ecclesiastic. He was a bishop who never ruled his see, even though he was appointed to two of them: Bishop of Ross, Ireland in 1482 and Bishop of Cork and Cloyne in 1490. His feast day is 25 October.

== Early life ==
Mac Cárthaigh was born in 1455 at Innishannon in County Cork. His father was the lord of Muskerry and his mother was reputedly the daughter of Edmund Fitzmaurice, ninth Lord of Kerry. It is probably the case that he belonged to the sept of the MacCarthy Reagh of Carbery. Laurence Rehenan, Professor of Ecclesiastical History of Maynooth College, suggests that he was educated by the Franciscan Friars of Timoleague.

Mac Cárthaigh studied for the priesthood under an uncle, Canon Thady Mac Cárthaigh and continued his studies in Paris with another relative, Professor Don Raymond, at the University of Paris. He was ordained in Cork by Bishop William Roche and travelled to Rome afterwards to continue his studies. It would appear that Thaddeus, prior to nomination to Ross, occupied a position in one of the Roman tribunals.

== Bishop of Ross ==
While in Rome, his many qualities made a deep impression and although only 27 years old, Pope Sixtus IV appointed him as Bishop of Ross in Cork, which see had become vacant upon the death of Bishop Donald. On 3 May 1482 Mac Cárthaigh was consecrated archbishop by in the Church of Santo Stefano del Cacco in Rome by Stephen Teglatius (or de Taleazis), Archbishop of Antivari (the modern Bar), assisted by Daniel, Bishop of Rhosus in Cilicia, and by Julianus de Matheis (or de Maffei de Vulterris), Bishop of Bertinori.

When he returned to Munster Mac Cárthaigh discovered that the see was already in the possession of Hugh O'Driscoll, who had been appointed to the see in 1473 by the same Pope Sixtus. At this stage in Irish history there was no single political entity. There were Gaelic kings and Anglo lords. It may have happened that news had reached Rome of the death of Bishop Hugh either innocently or through political intrigue.

A lengthy dispute broke out between the Mac Cárthaigh and O'Driscoll dynasties over who was the rightful bishop of Ross, during which the O'Driscolls made many false accusations against Mac Cárthaigh. Bishop O'Driscoll assumed Thaddeus was an imposter and complained to Rome. In 1485 Henry VII became king of England and lord of Ireland, and his party wanted to have its own representative as bishop of Ross. Mac Cárthaigh was declared an intruder and excommunicated. In 1488 Pope Innocent VIII confirmed the excommunication, at which time Mac Cárthaigh appealed the decision and a commission was set up. The commission found in his favour, and the excommunication was nullified. He was then appointed Bishop of Cork and Cloyne on 21 April 1490.

== Bishop of Cork and Cloyne ==
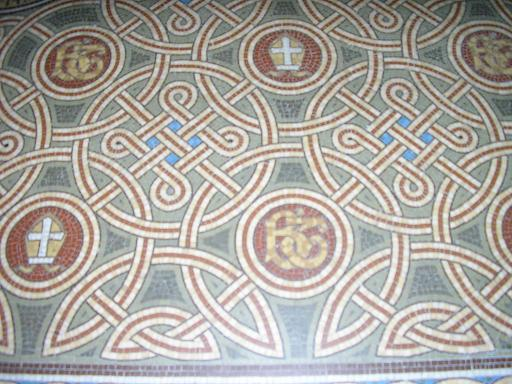
Mosaic in the Chapel of Blessed Thaddeus McCarthy, Cobh Cathedral.

Returning to Munster, Mac Cárthaigh found that Gerald FitzGerald had usurped the Diocese of Cork and Cloyne with support from local rulers. Opponents of the Mac Cárthaigh dynasty included the corporation of the City of Cork, and the Earl of Desmond. Gerald Fitzgerald had the backing of leading landowners in the county.

Armed men took possession of the cathedral preventing Mac Cárthaigh from entering. For two years, he travelled from town to village armed with the papal documents announcing his rightful appointment and absolution from any criminal charge. Having opposed any retaliation by his own lineage, they too abandoned him. Without dynastic support, status or security, Mac Cárthaigh once again set off for Rome to plead his case to the Pope. Pope Innocent XIII gave him another document dated 18 July 1492. It ordered that Gerald, Earl of Kildare, at that time, one of the most powerful figures in Ireland, should, with his army, protect and restore Mac Cárthaigh to his rightful place as Bishop of Cork and Cloyne.

Fearing danger to his life from his enemies, Mac Cárthaigh set out for Ireland as a pilgrim.

== Death ==
Fourteen weeks later, Mac Cárthaigh arrived at Ivrea having presumably walked from Rome. On the evening of 24 October 1492, a lone pilgrim arrived on foot at the hostel for pilgrims. Dressed in a coarse habit and hood and wearing the oyster shell emblem that ensured safe passage, he appeared to be very weak and worn out by fatigue. The warden of the hostel gave the exhausted traveler a hospitable welcome and a place to rest for the night. At dawn, a strange and mysterious light was observed coming from his room. On entering, the warden discovered the body of the pilgrim illuminated by a beautiful radiance of light. Tadhg Mac Cárthaigh was 37 years old.

Mac Cárthaigh would have been buried in a pauper's grave but the Bishop Nicholas Garigliatti was summoned. The bishop is said to have had an extraordinary dream during the night in which he had witnessed a man dressed in bishop's robes ascending in glory to heaven. He immediately recognised the dead man as the person he had seen in the dream. The man's belongings were examined - a wallet, a water container and a pilgrim staff were his sole possessions. However, the wallet contained some papal documents and a bishop's ring. Bishop Garigliatti ordered that the body be clothed in episcopal robes and brought to Ivrea Cathedral for solemn lying in state before burial within the cathedral. When news of the death of bishop Mac Cárthaigh traveling in disguise spread, crowds flocked to the cathedral of Ivrea for his funeral. He was buried in the Ivrea cathedral under the altar of St Andrew the Apostle.

== Veneration ==
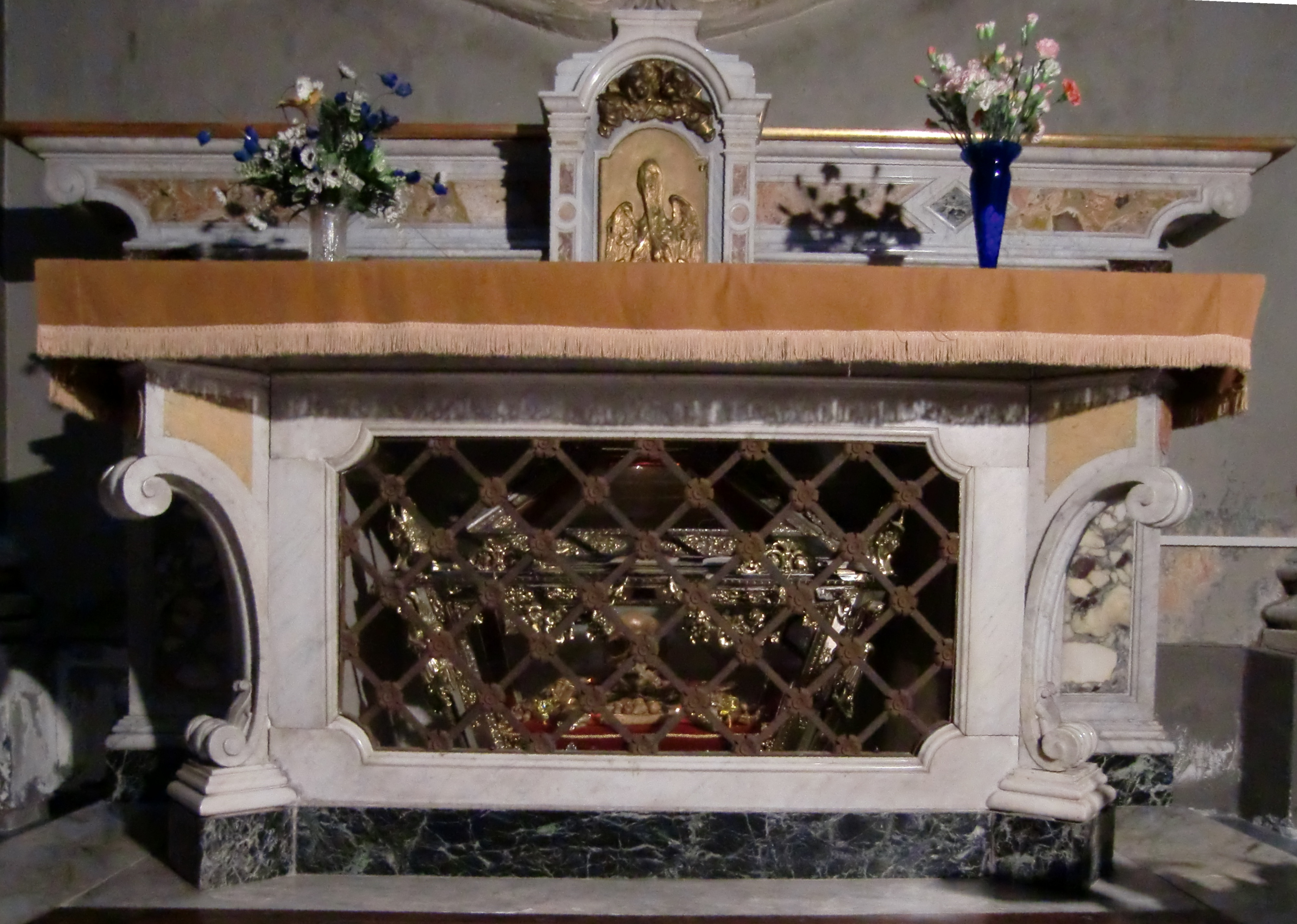
Altar with the funeral urn of Blessed Tadhg Mac Cárthaigh, Cathedral of Ivrea

His tomb became a local shrine. In 1742, when his tomb was opened, the body was found to be perfectly preserved.

During the great famine in 1847, the clergy and people of Ivrea donated a substantial sum of money for the relief of the Irish Famine victims. They also requested any information on Mac Cárthaigh, principally because of the veneration of the people of Ivrea and the many miracles attributed to his intercession. This request aroused great interest in Mac Cárthaigh and, after a long investigation into his life, it was decided to seek his beatification on behalf of the people and clergy of Ivrea and Cork.

In 1896 Pope Leo XIII confirmed the immemorial cult of the "Blessed Thaddeus". The same year (1896) clerics in Ivrea agreed to donate major relics of Mac Cárthaigh to the dioceses of Cork & Ross and Cloyne. These relics can now be found in The Church of The Immaculate Conception The Lough, Cork North Cathedral, Cobh Cathedral and St Mary's Parish Church in Youghal. His feast day of 25 October is kept in the dioceses of Ross, Cork, and Cloyne, and in Ivrea, where he was buried.

Mac Cárthaigh was honoured with the title of "White Martyr of Munster" principally because of the intense mental and physical anguish.

== Bibliography ==
- L. Lainé, Généalogie de la Maison de McCarthy, Paris 1839
- M. Brady, Episcopal Succession, Vol. II, Rome 1876
- Canon Vaudagnotti,Vita del Cardinale Richelmy, Ivrea 1896
- Giovanni Saroglia, Il Beato Taddeo Macar, Vescovo Irlandese, Ivrea
- F. Hurley, Blessed Thaddeus McCarthy in Journal of the Cork Archeological and Historical Society, 1897, pp. 94–100
- M. Kiely, Episcopal Succession in Cork and Cloyne in the Fifteenth Century, in Irish Ecclesiastical Record, 1932, pp. 124–125
- Les Pères Bénédictins de Paris, Vies des Saints et Bienhereux, Paris 1952
- A. Tommasini, Irish Saints in Italy, London 1937
- Sr. A. Bolster, History of the Diocese of Cork, Cork 1972
- J. O'Brien, The Blessed Thaddeus McCarthy, in Pobal Dé: Cloyne Diocesan Magazine, vol. 16 (1992), pp. 14–15
- A. O'Callaghan, Blessed Thaddeus McCarthy "White Martyr of Munster", Source
- L. Gaffuri, Attorno alle spoglie di un pellegrino-vescovo: il culto dell’irlandese Taddeo in Ivrea, in Scritti in onore di Girolamo Arnaldi. Offerti dalla Scuola nazionale di studi medioevali, Roma 2001 (Nuovi Studi Storici, 54), pp. 183–215.
