= 1496 in Ireland =

- Centuries: 13th; 14th; 15th; 16th; 17th
- Decades: 1470s; 1480s; 1490s; 1500s; 1510s
- See also: Other events of 1496; List of years in Ireland

Events from the year 1496 in Ireland.

== Incumbent ==
- Lord: Henry VII

== Events ==
- Garret More, the Great Earl of Kildare, returns to Ireland as Lord Deputy of Ireland. He holds the position until his death in 1513.
- St. Mel's Cathedral, Ardagh, is severely damaged in fighting and never restored.

== Births ==
- James Butler (Bocach), ninth earl of Ormond.

== Deaths ==
- Rowland Fitz Eustace, 1st Baron Portlester.
