= Domhnall Glas Ó Curnín =

Irish poet

Domhnall Glas Ó Curnín (died 1519) was an Irish poet.

Ó Curnín was a member of a brehon literary family of the Kingdom of Breifne.

The Annals of the Four Masters record his death, sub anno 1519:

- Domhnall Glas Ó Curnín ... died.

== See also ==
- Cormac Ó Curnín, died 1474
- Ruaidrí Ó Curnín, died 1496
- Conor Carragh Ó Curnín, died 1519
