= 1498 in Ireland =

- Centuries: 13th; 14th; 15th; 16th; 17th
- Decades: 1470s; 1480s; 1490s; 1500s; 1510s
- See also: Other events of 1498; List of years in Ireland

Events from the year 1498 in Ireland include:

== Incumbent ==
- Lord: Henry VI
