= 1480 in Ireland =

- Centuries: 13th; 14th; 15th; 16th; 17th
- Decades: 1460s; 1470s; 1480s; 1490s; 1500s
- See also: Other events of 1480; List of years in Ireland

Events from the year 1480 in Ireland.

== Incumbent ==
- Lord: Edward IV

== Events ==
- Ballaghmore Castle is built by the chieftain MacGiollaphadraig.
- Ballyhack Castle built by the Knights Hospitallers.

== Deaths ==
- Seán Ó Maolalaidh, Chief of the Name
