= 1501 =

1501 in various calendars
- Gregorian calendar: 1501; MDI
- Ab urbe condita: 2254
- Armenian calendar: 950; ԹՎ ՋԾ
- Assyrian calendar: 6251
- Balinese saka calendar: 1422–1423
- Bengali calendar: 907–908
- Berber calendar: 2451
- English Regnal year: 16 Hen. 7 – 17 Hen. 7
- Buddhist calendar: 2045
- Burmese calendar: 863
- Byzantine calendar: 7009–7010
- Chinese calendar: 庚申年 (Metal Monkey); 4198 or 3991 — to — 辛酉年 (Metal Rooster); 4199 or 3992
- Coptic calendar: 1217–1218
- Discordian calendar: 2667
- Ethiopian calendar: 1493–1494
- Hebrew calendar: 5261–5262
- Hindu calendars
- Vikram Samvat: 1557–1558
- Shaka Samvat: 1422–1423
- Kali Yuga: 4601–4602
- Holocene calendar: 11501
- Igbo calendar: 501–502
- Iranian calendar: 879–880
- Islamic calendar: 906–907
- Japanese calendar: Meiō 10 / Bunki 1 (文亀元年)
- Javanese calendar: 1418–1419
- Julian calendar: 1501; MDI
- Korean calendar: 3834
- Minguo calendar: 411 before ROC 民前411年
- Nanakshahi calendar: 33
- Thai solar calendar: 2043–2044
- Tibetan calendar: ལྕགས་ཕོ་སྤྲེ་ལོ་ (male Iron-Monkey); 1627 or 1246 or 474 — to — ལྕགས་མོ་བྱ་ལོ་ (female Iron-Bird); 1628 or 1247 or 475

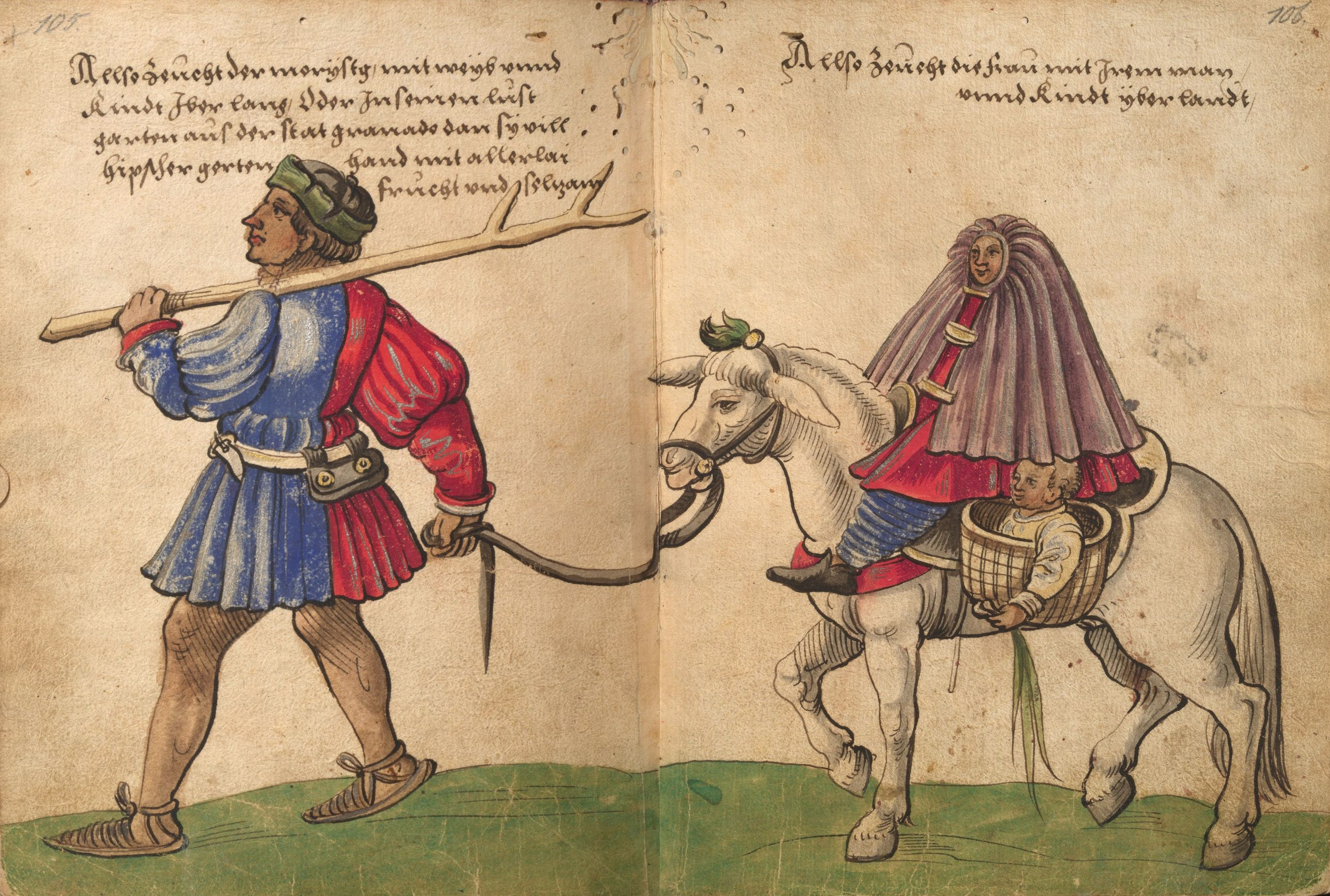
April 11: the Rebellion of the Alpujarras ends

Year 1501 (MDI) was a common year starting on Friday in the Julian calendar. It was the first year of the 16th century.

== Events ==
=== January–March ===
- January 17 – Cesar Borgia returns triumphantly to Rome, from Romagna.
- February 1 – The Duchy of Bavaria-Dachau, created in Germany in 1467 after Sigismund, Duke of Bavaria was granted his own state following his resignation from the throne of the Duchy of Bavaria-Munich, reverts to Bavaria-Munich's control upon Sigismund's death.
- March 4 – Minkhaung II becomes the sole King of Burma upon the death of his son Thihathura II, with whom he was co-ruler for 15 years. Minkhaung's reign ends five weeks later when he dies on April 7.
- March 25 – Portuguese navigator João da Nova discovers Ascension Island. It is definitely sighted and named on May 20, 1503 (Feast of the Ascension) by Afonso de Albuquerque.

=== April–June ===
- April 7 – Shwenankyawshin Narapati begins an almost 26-year reign as King of Burma upon the death of his father, King Minkhaung II.
- April 11 – The Rebellion in the Alpujarras ends in southern Spain with a treaty of surrender of the last Muslim insurgents in the Alpujarra Mountains in Andalusia on the Mediterranean Sea. The Muslims are given the choice of expulsion or conversion to Christianity.
- May 10 – The formal coronation of King Shwenankyawshin of Burma takes place at his capital in Inwa in the Mandalay Region on the 9th waning of Kason, 863 ME.
- May 13 – The Venetian Republic signs a treaty with the Kingdom of Hungary and Pope Alexander VI for troops to protect Venetian Dalmatia during the Ottoman–Venetian War (1499–1503).
- May 15 – Harmonice Musices Odhecaton, the first printed collection of polyphonic music, is published by Ottaviano Petrucci in Venice.
- June 9 – The semi-independent city of Basel joins the Swiss Confederation as the eleventh canton of Switzerland.
- June 17 – Alexander Jagiellon, Grand Duke of Lithuania since 1492, becomes the new King of Poland upon the sudden death of his older brother, Jan I Olbracht.
- June 23 – Nicolau Coelho, part of Pedro Cabral's Portuguese expedition to India, returns home with one ship, having left ahead of Cabral.
- June 24 – Cesare Borgia's French troops storm and overtake the fortress at Capua in the Kingdom of Naples, overcoming the defense of Fabrizio Colonna in the occupation of the Spanish Kingdom of Aragon in southern Italy.

=== July–September ===
- July 21 – Portuguese explorer Pedro Álvares Cabral and his surviving crew return to Lisbon at the end of a 15-month expedition to India, with only seven of their original fleet of 13 ships. The cargo from India, however, returns a profit to the Portuguese crown of nine times its investment.
- July 25 – The Kingdom of Naples, led by King Federico I, surrenders to Cesare Borgia's French and Aragonese troops.
- July 27 – Copernicus is formally installed as canon of Frauenberg Cathedral.
- August 1 – Hans, King of Denmark, Norway and Sweden is deposed from the Swedish throne after fleeing the country following the victory of Swedish rebels at Örebro during the War of Deposition against King Hans. His wife, Christina of Saxony, is left behind at Stockholm as his regent of Sweden, to command a royal garrison at Tre Kronor ("Three Crowns"), the royal castle. Returning to Denmark, King Hans then organizes Danish troops to attempt to retake Sweden in the Dano-Swedish War (1501–1512).
- August 2 – King Federico of Naples abdicates upon the conquest of the Kingdom of Naples by France, and France's King Louis XII becomes the nominal monarch as Luigi II, re di Napoli. King Louis appoints Louis d'Armagnac, Duke of Nemours as France's Viceroy of Naples.
- August 27 – Battle of the Siritsa River: The Livonian Order, supporting the Grand Duchy of Lithuania in the Second Muscovite–Lithuanian War, and commanded by Wolter von Plettenberg, defeats an army of the Grand Duchy of Moscow and Pskov Republic.
- September 3 – On complaints from Christopher Columbus, who had been replaced as Viceroy of the New World and arrested in 1500 by Francisco de Bobadilla, Queen Isabella of Spain orders that Bobadilla be recalled from Santo Domingo. Declining to allow Columbus to resume his brutal rule of the New World, the Queen appoints a friend, Nicolás de Ovando, as the new Viceroy. Although Bobadilla receives news of his firing several weeks later, he declines to step aside. Ovando will assemble a fleet of 30 ships and depart Spain on February 13 for Santo Domingo.
- September 12 – Maximilian I, Archduke of Austria, issues a decree making firearms safety tests mandatory.
- September 18 – Aleksandras Jogailaitis, Grand Duke of Lithuania, issues a decree requiring all Roman Catholic priests in the Duchy to become fluent in the Lithuanian language.
- September 27 – Queen Isabella orders New World Governor Bobadilla to return the assets confiscated from Christopher Columbus and the two other Columbus brothers.

=== October–December ===
- October 2
  - Leonardo Loredan is elected 75th doge of the Venetian Republic, taking office on October 13, and serves for almost 20 years.
  - Spanish princess Catherine of Aragon arrives in England and arrives at Plymouth. Although she will later become the wife of King Henry VIII in 1509, she initially arrives to marry Henry's older brother, Arthur, Prince of Wales.
- October 13 – Maximilian of Austria and Louis XII of France sign the Treaty of Trente with Austria recognizing all French conquests in the northern territories of Italy.
- October 30 – The Banquet of Chestnuts is purportedly held by Cesare Borgia, in the Papal Palace of Rome (this account is not historical fact, and could be attributed to enemies of Alexander VI).
- November 1 (All Saints) – Amerigo Vespucci discovers and names Baía de Todos os Santos, in Brazil.
- November 4
  - Second Muscovite–Lithuanian War: At the Battle of Mstislavl, Grand Prince Ivan's Southern Muscovite army defeats the forces of the Grand Duchy of Lithuania.
  - Philip and Joanna of Castile leave for Spain.
- November 12 – Sten Sture the Elder is elected Regent of Sweden for the second time, becoming the Scandinavian nation's chief executive after King Hans of Denmark is deposed. No replacement of the monarchy is planned by the rebel Swedish nobles.
- November 14 – Arthur, Prince of Wales, marries the Spanish princess Catherine of Aragon.
- November 24 – A large army of the Grand Duchy of Moscow overruns Livonia during the Second Muscovite–Lithuanian War.
- December 12 – Grand Duke Aleksandras Jogailaitis, Grand Duke of Lithuania becomes the King of Poland as Aleksander I Jagiellończyk.
- December 22 – (1 Jumada al-Thani 907 AH) Ismail I is enthroned as the first Shah of Iran, choosing Tabriz as his capital, founding the Safavid dynasty in northern Iran. He declares Shi'ism the official and compulsory religion, under penalty of death.
- December 31 – First Battle of Cannanore: João da Nova fleet engaged the fleet of the Zamorin in a battle outside of the Cannanore harbor, the first Portuguese naval battle in the Indian Ocean.

=== Date unknown ===
- The Swiss cantons of Basel and Schaffhausen join the Old Swiss Confederacy.
- Gaspar Corte-Real, Portuguese navigator, makes the first documented European landing in North America since c. 1000 A.D.
- Rodrigo de Bastidas, sailing westward from Venezuela in search of gold, becomes the first European to explore the Isthmus of Panama.
- Amerigo Vespucci maps the two stars Alpha Centauri and Beta Centauri, as well as the stars of the constellation Crux, which are below the horizon in Europe.
- Dhaulpur is taken by Sikandar Lodi.
- Michelangelo returns to his native Florence, to begin work on the statue David.
- Italic type (cut by Francesco Griffo) is first used by Aldus Manutius at the Aldine Press in Venice, in an edition of Virgil.
- Martin Luther enters the University of Erfurt.

== Births ==
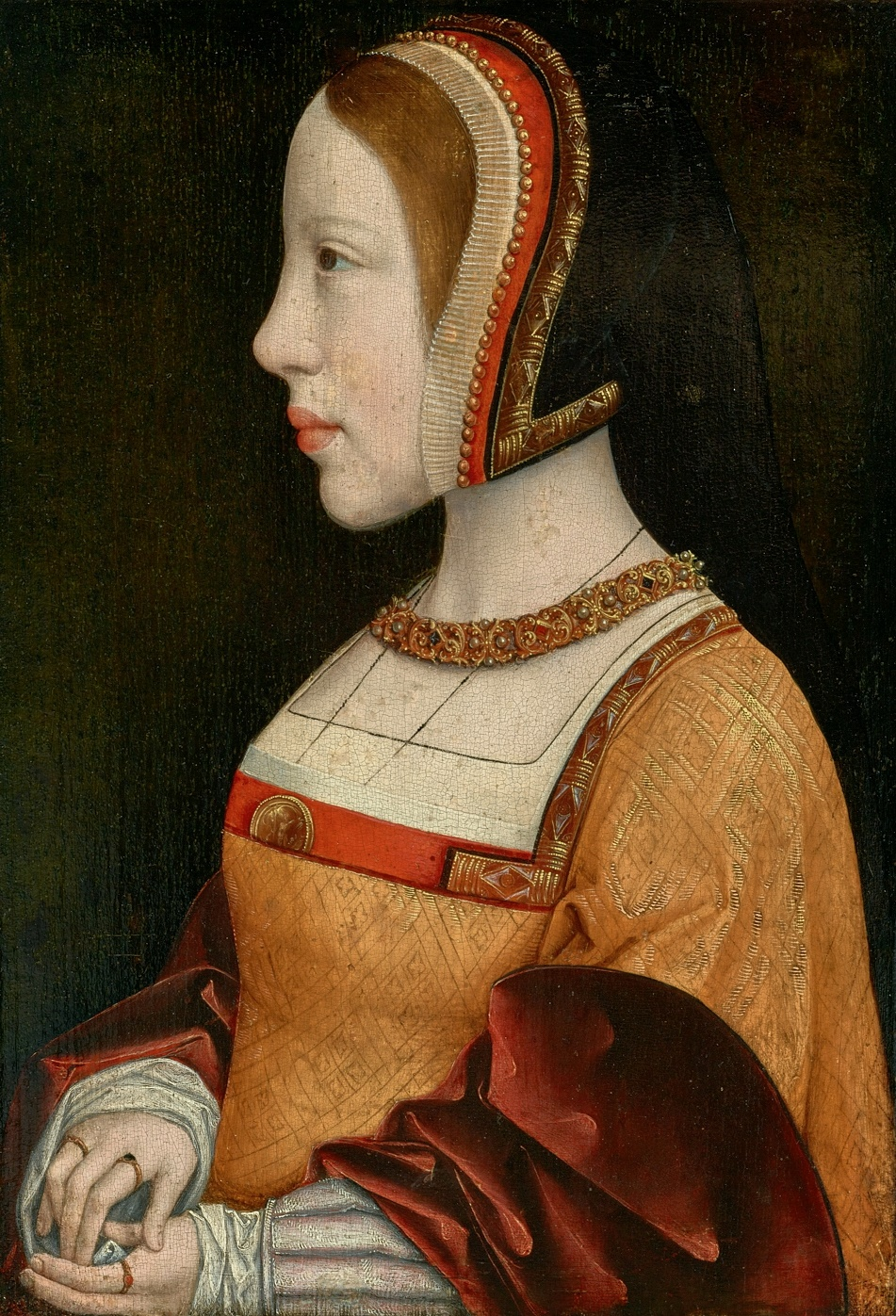
Isabella of Burgundy

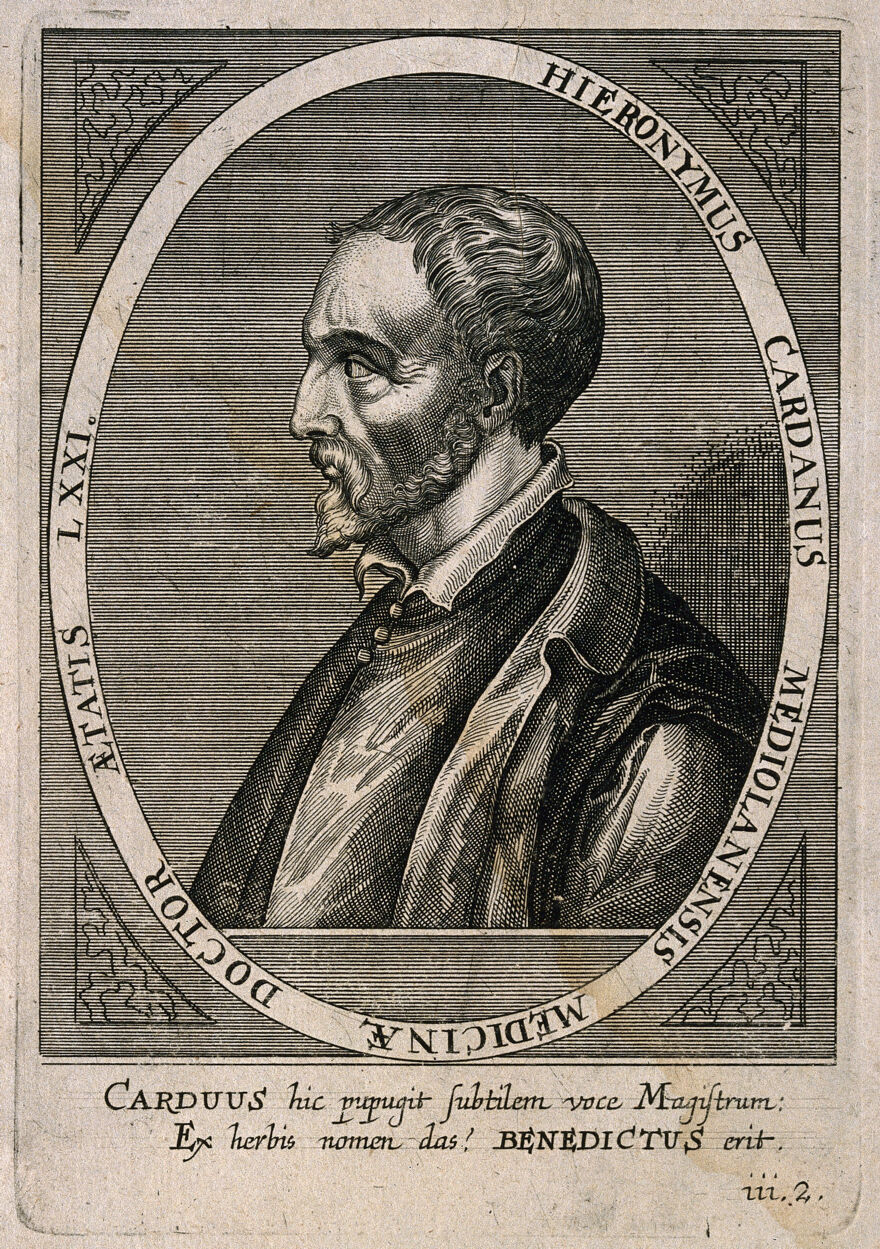
Gerolamo Cardano

- January 16 – Anthony Denny, confidant of Henry VIII of England (d. 1559)
- January 17 – Leonhart Fuchs, German physician and botanist (d. 1566)
- January 24 – Jacob Milich, German astronomer and mathematician (d. 1559)
- February 24 – Sixt Birck, German humanist (d. 1554)
- March 21 – Anne Brooke, Baroness Cobham, English noble (d. 1558)
- March 12 – Pietro Andrea Mattioli, Italian scientist (d. 1577)
- May 6 – Pope Marcellus II (d. 1555)
- May 17 – Stanisław of Masovia, Polish duke (d. 1524)
- July 10 – Cho Sik, Korean Confucian scholar and politician (d. 1572)
- July 18 – Isabella of Burgundy, queen of Christian II of Denmark (d. 1526)
- August 17 – Philipp II, Count of Hanau-Münzenberg (d. 1529)
- September 18 – Henry Stafford, 1st Baron Stafford, English baron (d. 1563)
- September 24 – Gerolamo Cardano, Italian mathematician, physician, astrologer and gambler (d. 1576)
- September 26 – Gian Gabriele I of Saluzzo, Italian abbot, Marquess of Saluzzo (d. 1548)
- November 14 – Anna of Oldenburg, Regent of East Frisia from 1540 to 1561 (d. 1575)
- December 2 – Queen Munjeong, Korean queen (d. 1565)
- date unknown
  - Girolamo da Carpi, Italian painter (d. 1556)
  - Dawit II, Emperor of Ethiopia (d. 1540)
  - Bauck Poppema, Dutch noble and heroine
  - Anne Boleyn, second queen of Henry VIII of England (b. this year or 1507; d. 1536)
  - Murakami Yoshikiyo, Japanese nobleman (d. 1573)
- probable
  - Nicholas Heath, archbishop of York and Lord Chancellor (d. 1578)
  - Garcia de Orta, Portuguese physician (d. 1568)
  - Hilaire Penet, French composer

== Deaths ==
=== January–June ===
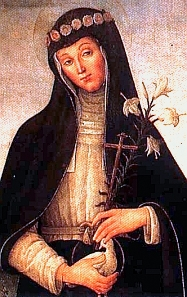
Blessed Columba of Rieti

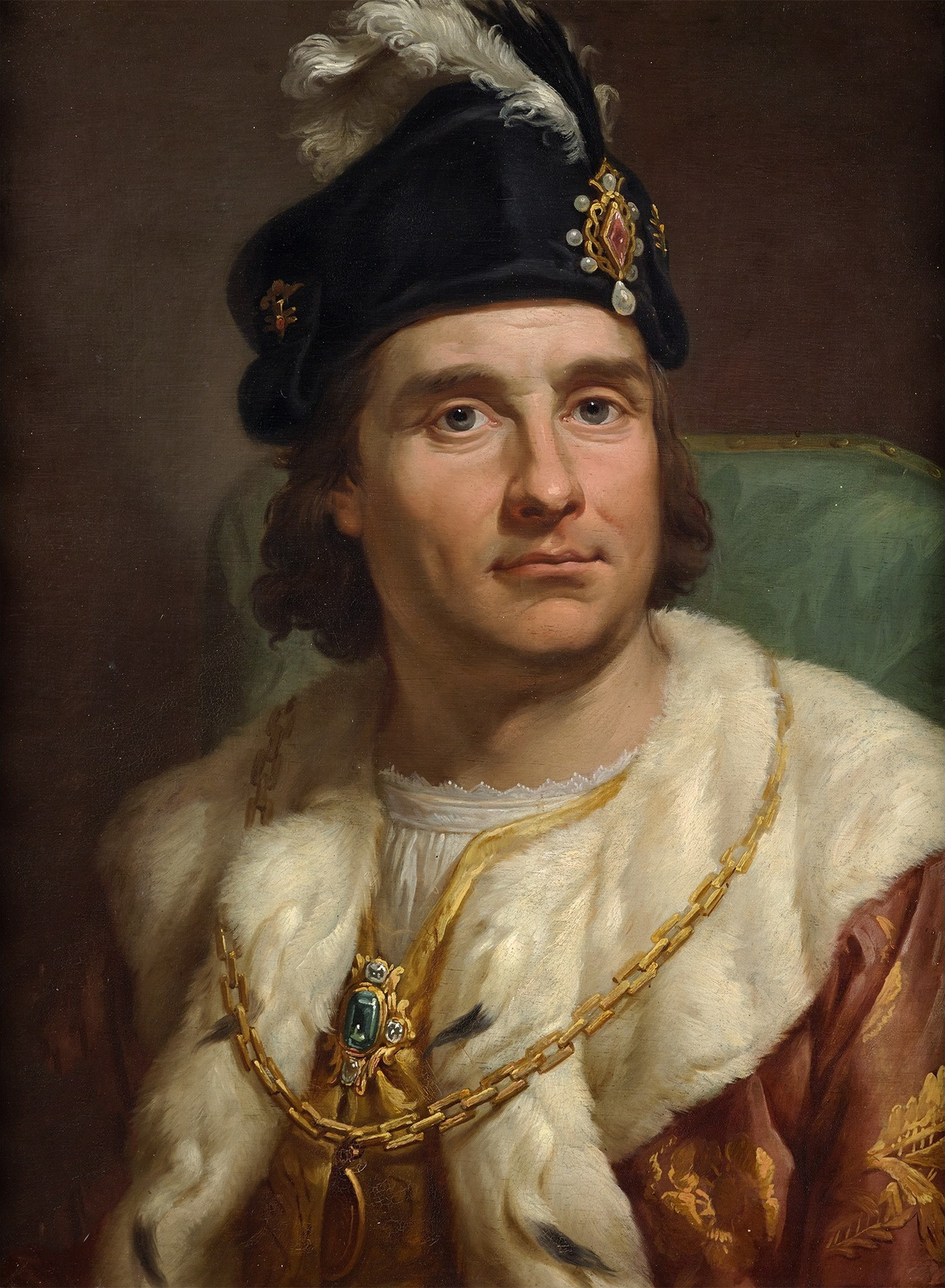
John I Albert

- January 3 – Ali-Shir Nava'i, Central Asian poet, politician and writer (b. 1441)
- January 5 – John Dynham, 1st Baron Dynham, English baron and Lord High Treasurer (b. 1433)
- January 25 – Margaret of Bavaria, Electress Palatine, Princess of Bavaria-Landshut (b. 1456)
- February 1 – Sigismund, Duke of Bavaria, German noble (b. 1439)
- March 4 – Thihathura II of Ava (b. 1474)
- April – John Doget, English diplomat
- April 7 – Minkhaung II, king of Ava (b. 1446)
- April 23 – Domenico della Rovere, Italian Catholic cardinal (b. 1442)
- May 3 – John Devereux, 9th Baron Ferrers of Chartley, English baron (b. 1463)
- May 7 – Giovanni Battista Zeno, Italian Catholic cardinal
- May 20 – Columba of Rieti, Italian Dominican tertiary Religious Sister and blessed (b. 1467)
- June 8 – George Gordon, 2nd Earl of Huntly, Earl of Huntly and Lord Chancellor of Scotland (b. 1440)
- June 17 – John I Albert of Poland (b. 1459)

=== July–December ===
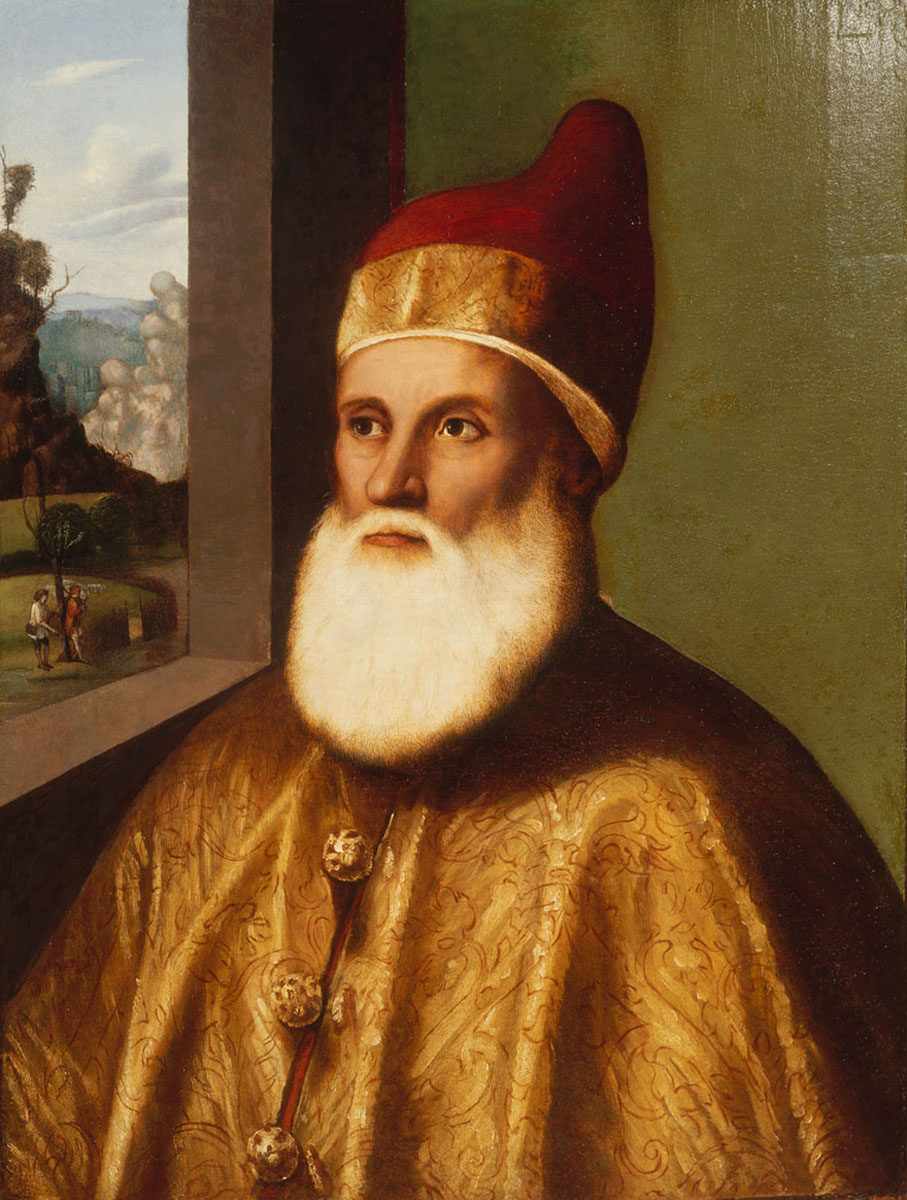
Agostino Barbarigo

- August 15 – Constantine Lascaris, Greek scholar and grammarian
- September 20
  - Agostino Barbarigo, Doge of Venice
  - Thomas Grey, 1st Marquess of Dorset, stepson of Edward IV of England (b. 1457)
- September 26 – Džore Držić, Croatian poet and playwright (b. 1461)
- September 29 – Andrew Stewart, Scottish bishop (b. 1442)
- November 19 – Amalia of Saxony, Duchess of Bavaria-Landshut (b. 1436)
- probable – Gaspar Corte-Real, Portuguese explorer (b. 1450)
