= 1409 in Ireland =

- Centuries: 13th; 14th; 15th; 16th; 17th
- Decades: 1380s; 1390s; 1400s; 1410s; 1420s
- See also: Other events of 1409; List of years in Ireland

Events from the year 1409 in Ireland.

== Incumbent ==
- Lord: Henry IV

== Events ==
- Lord Lieutenant of Ireland, Thomas of Lancaster, Duke of Clarence, left Ireland, remaining in the role until 1413.
- James Cornwalsh appointed justice of the peace in Wexford.
- Patrick Barrett appointed Justice of the Peace in Ferns
- Jenico Dartasso led a campaign in Ulster.
