= 1402 in Ireland =

- Centuries: 13th; 14th; 15th; 16th; 17th
- Decades: 1380s; 1390s; 1400s; 1410s; 1420s
- See also: Other events of 1402; List of years in Ireland

Events from the year 1402 in Ireland.

== Incumbents ==
- King of England and Lord of Ireland – Henry IV of England
- Lord Lieutenant of Ireland – James Butler, 3rd Earl of Ormond.

== Events ==
- The government of the Lordship of Ireland continued to struggle to maintain authority beyond the English-controlled region known as The Pale, which surrounded Dublin. Outside this area, Gaelic Irish lords and Anglo-Irish magnates exercised significant autonomy. Gaelic dynasties such as the O'Neill dynasty, O'Conor dynasty, and O'Brien dynasty maintaining regional power.
- Gaelic Resurgence continued across much of the island. Powerful dynasties in regions such as Ulster and Connacht maintained effective independence from the English administrative.
- The authority of the English Crown in Irelandremained tied to the reign of Henry IV of England, whose government faced political instability in England and Wales during the early 15th century. These pressures limited England’s ability to reinforce its rule in Ireland.
- Local conflicts between Gaelic chieftains and Anglo-Irish lords continued throughout the year, particularly in frontier areas bordering The Pale and in parts of Leinster and Munster.
- The foundation of the Franciscan Quin Friary in County Clare was founded by the Gaelic chieftain Síoda Cam MacNamara on the site of a former Anglo-Normans castle of the de Clare family. The establishment became one of the earliest Franciscan foundations in Gaelic-controlled Ireland.

== Deaths ==
- Murder of the Sheriff of Louth: The sheriff of County Louth, John Dowdall, was killed by local settlers during a period of political instability in the Anglo-Irish frontier region.
