= 1407 in Ireland =

- Centuries: 13th; 14th; 15th; 16th; 17th
- Decades: 1380s; 1390s; 1400s; 1410s; 1420s
- See also: Other events of 1407; List of years in Ireland

Events from the year 1407 in Ireland.

== Incumbent ==
- Lord: Henry IV

== Deaths ==
- Alibhe Tadhg, King of Élie
