= 1386 in Ireland =

- Centuries: 12th; 13th; 14th; 15th; 16th
- Decades: 1360s; 1370s; 1380s; 1390s; 1400s
- See also: Other events of 1386; List of years in Ireland

Events from the year 1386 in Ireland.

== Incumbent ==
- Lord: Richard II

== Events ==
- 8 March – King Richard II of England grants John of Gaunt, 1st Duke of Lancaster, control of all royal lands in Ireland.

== Births ==
- Thomas FitzGerald, 5th Earl of Desmond, born circa 1386
