= 1412 in Ireland =

- Centuries: 13th; 14th; 15th; 16th; 17th
- Decades: 1390s; 1400s; 1410s; 1420s; 1430s
- See also: Other events of 1412; List of years in Ireland

Events from the year 1412 in Ireland.

== Incumbent ==
- Lord: Henry IV

== Events ==
- Drogheda-in-Meath (for which a charter was granted in 1194) and Drogheda-in-Oriel (or 'Uriel') as County Louth was then known, were united and Drogheda became a 'County Corporate', styled as 'the County of the Town of Drogheda'.
