= 1394 in Ireland =

- Centuries: 12th; 13th; 14th; 15th; 16th
- Decades: 1370s; 1380s; 1390s; 1400s; 1410s
- See also: Other events of 1394; List of years in Ireland

Events from the year 1394 in Ireland.

== Incumbent ==
- Lord: Richard II

== Events ==
- 2 October – King Richard II of England leads his first expedition to Ireland to enforce his rule. However, in the Battle of Ros-Mhic-Thriúin, the King of Leinster, Art Óg Mac Murchadha Caomhánach, defeats the forces of the Norman Lordship of Ireland led by Richard and Roger Mortimer, 4th Earl of March.
- 25 December – Richard defines the borders of English rule in Ireland; later to become known as the English Pale.

== Deaths ==
- Thomas le Reve - the first Bishop of Waterford and Lismore following the unification of the two sees
