= 1392 in Ireland =

- Centuries: 12th; 13th; 14th; 15th; 16th
- Decades: 1370s; 1380s; 1390s; 1400s; 1410s
- See also: Other events of 1392; List of years in Ireland

Events from the year 1392 in Ireland.

== Incumbent ==
- Lord: Richard II

== Events ==
- By April – Thomas of Woodstock, 1st Duke of Gloucester, is created Lieutenant of Ireland by his nephew King Richard but forbidden to travel there.

== Births ==
- James Butler, 4th Earl of Ormonde (d. 1452)
