= 1390 in Ireland =

- Centuries: 12th; 13th; 14th; 15th; 16th
- Decades: 1370s; 1380s; 1390s; 1400s; 1410s
- See also: Other events of 1390; List of years in Ireland

Events from the year 1390 in Ireland.

== Incumbent ==
- Lord: Richard II

== Events ==
- The town of Ballinrobe in County Mayo is founded.
- 1390 or 1391 – the Book of Ballymote is written.
