= 1393 in Ireland =

- Centuries: 12th; 13th; 14th; 15th; 16th
- Decades: 1370s; 1380s; 1390s; 1400s; 1410s
- See also: Other events of 1393; List of years in Ireland

Events from the year 1393 in Ireland.

== Incumbent ==
- Lord: Richard II

== Events ==
- Richard Northalis, Bishop of Ossory is appointed Lord Chancellor of Ireland
- Maelruanaidh MacDermot succeeds Aedh MacDermot, as King of Magh Luirg in north-central Ireland

== Deaths ==
- James Butler, 4th Earl of Ormond
