= 1418 in Ireland =

- Centuries: 13th; 14th; 15th; 16th; 17th
- Decades: 1390s; 1400s; 1410s; 1420s; 1430s
- See also: Other events of 1418; List of years in Ireland

Events from the year 1418 in Ireland.

== Incumbent ==
- Lord: Henry V

== Events ==
- The Great Book of Lecan is completed at Enniscrone. (Started in 1397).
- James FitzGerald, 6th Earl of Desmond deprived Thomas FitzGerald, 5th Earl of Desmond of his earldom and dispossess him for marrying far below his station. Catherine was the daughter of one of Thomas's dependants, William MacCormac, known as "the Monk of Feale." The marriage between a man of Norman ancestry and a woman of Gaelic blood was in violation of the Statutes of Kilkenny.

== Births ==
- James Ormonde, Lord Treasurer of Ireland, Earl of Ormonde

== Deaths ==
- Gilla Isa Mor mac Donnchadh MacFhirbhisigh, historian, scribe and poet.
