= 1419 in Ireland =

- Centuries: 13th; 14th; 15th; 16th; 17th
- Decades: 1390s; 1400s; 1410s; 1420s; 1430s
- See also: Other events of 1419; List of years in Ireland

Events from the year 1419 in Ireland.

== Incumbent ==
- Lord: Henry V

== Deaths ==
- Murchad mac Brian Ó Flaithbheartaigh, Taoiseach of Iar Connacht and Chief of the Name
- Dauid mac Tanaide Ó Maolconaire
- Fercert Ó hUiginn, an Irish poet.
- John Fitzadam, an Irish judge.
