= 1411 in Ireland =

- Centuries: 13th; 14th; 15th; 16th; 17th
- Decades: 1390s; 1400s; 1410s; 1420s; 1430s
- See also: Other events of 1411; List of years in Ireland

Events from the year 1411 in Ireland.

== Incumbent ==
- Lord: Henry IV

== Events ==
Completion of the Leabhar Breac, Great Book of Duniry.

== Births ==
- Richard of York, lieutenant of Ireland.

== Deaths ==
- Murchadh Ó Cuindlis, scribe.
