= 1395 in Ireland =

- Centuries: 12th; 13th; 14th; 15th; 16th
- Decades: 1370s; 1380s; 1390s; 1400s; 1410s
- See also: Other events of 1395; List of years in Ireland

Events from the year 1395 in Ireland.

== Incumbent ==
- Lord: Richard II

== Events ==
- Defeat of Leinster Irish under Art Mór Mac Murchadha Caomhánach, King of Leinster and submission of nearly all Irish and rebel English chiefs to King Richard II of England.
- 15 May – Richard leaves Ireland, having achieved his objectives.
