= 1404 in Ireland =

- Centuries: 13th; 14th; 15th; 16th; 17th
- Decades: 1380s; 1390s; 1400s; 1410s; 1420s
- See also: Other events of 1404; List of years in Ireland

Events from the year 1404 in Ireland.

== Incumbent ==
- Lord: Henry IV

== Deaths ==
- Flann Óc mac Séoan Ó Domhnalláin was Ollamh Síol Muireadaigh
- John Colton, Archbishop of Armagh
- John Keppock, a judge of the late fourteenth century, who held the offices of Lord Chief Justice of Ireland and Chief Baron of the Irish Exchequer.
