= 1420 in Ireland =

- Centuries: 13th; 14th; 15th; 16th; 17th
- Decades: 1400s; 1410s; 1420s; 1430s; 1440s
- See also: Other events of 1420; List of years in Ireland

Events from the year 1420 in Ireland.

== Incumbent ==
- Lord: Henry V

== Events ==
- Luttrellstown Castle was completed.

== Births ==
- 24 November – James Butler, 5th Earl of Ormonde, Lord Lieutenant (d. 1461)

== Deaths ==
- Giolla na Naomh O hUidhrin, Irish historian and poet
- Thomas FitzGerald, 5th Earl of Desmond
