= 1396 in Ireland =

- Centuries: 12th; 13th; 14th; 15th; 16th
- Decades: 1370s; 1380s; 1390s; 1400s; 1410s
- See also: Other events of 1396; List of years in Ireland

Events from the year 1396 in Ireland.

== Incumbent ==
- Lord: Richard II

== Events ==
- 27 January – Thomas Sparkford, previously a priest of the Diocese of Exeter in England, is appointed Bishop of Waterford and Lismore, but dies in office before July 1397
- The town of Galway seeks a murage charter (authority to build a defensive wall) from the Crown
