= 1414 in Ireland =

- Centuries: 13th; 14th; 15th; 16th; 17th
- Decades: 1390s; 1400s; 1410s; 1420s; 1430s
- See also: Other events of 1414; List of years in Ireland

Events from the year 1414 in Ireland.

== Incumbent ==
- Lord: Henry V

== Events ==
- A prolonged struggle begins between the factions of James Butler, 4th Earl of Ormonde, and John Talbot, 2nd Earl of Shrewsbury, for control of royal government in Ireland (lasted until 1447).
