= 1399 in Ireland =

- Centuries: 12th; 13th; 14th; 15th; 16th
- Decades: 1370s; 1380s; 1390s; 1400s; 1410s
- See also: Other events of 1399; List of years in Ireland

Events from the year 1399 in Ireland.

== Incumbent ==
- Lord: Richard II (until 29 September), then Henry IV

== Events ==
- 29 May–August: Richard II of England’s second expedition to Ireland, with inconclusive results. Henry Bolingbroke uses his absence to invade England and claim the throne.
- December: Henry IV orders implementation of the Absentee Act of 1380. This demands that all who held lands, benefices, or offices in Ireland should go to reside there and defend the land against 'Irish rebels'.
- Battle of Tragh-Bhaile: forces of the Norman Lordship of Ireland defeat those of Henry O Neill's sons.

== Deaths ==
- 4 March – John FitzGerald, 4th Earl of Desmond, drowned.
- Gilla na Naemh Mac Aodhagáin, a professor of Judiciary.
