= 1400 in Ireland =

- Centuries: 12th; 13th; 14th; 15th; 16th
- Decades: 1380s; 1390s; 1400s; 1410s; 1420s
- See also: Other events of 1400; List of years in Ireland

Events from the year 1400 in Ireland.

== Incumbent ==
- Lord: Henry IV

== Events ==
- O'Conor dynasty captured the Donamon Castle from House of Burgh.
- Founding of a Dominican priory in Longford.

== Deaths ==
- Alexander de Balscot, Irish clergy
- Brian Sreamhach Ua Briain, King of Thomond
- Seoan, King of Breifne O'Reilly
