= 1401 in Ireland =

- Centuries: 13th; 14th; 15th; 16th; 17th
- Decades: 1380s; 1390s; 1400s; 1410s; 1420s
- See also: Other events of 1401; List of years in Ireland

Events from the year 1401 in Ireland.

== Incumbent ==
- Lord: Henry IV

== Events ==
- Thomas Cranley, Primate of Ireland appointed Lord Chancellor of Ireland
