= 1398 in Ireland =

- Centuries: 12th; 13th; 14th; 15th; 16th
- Decades: 1370s; 1380s; 1390s; 1400s; 1410s
- See also: Other events of 1398; List of years in Ireland

Events from the year 1398 in Ireland.

== Incumbent ==
- Lord: Richard II

== Events ==
- Glendalough monastery in Wicklow is destroyed by English troops.
