= 1397 in Ireland =

- Centuries: 12th; 13th; 14th; 15th; 16th
- Decades: 1370s; 1380s; 1390s; 1400s; 1410s
- See also: Other events of 1397; List of years in Ireland

Events from the year 1397 in Ireland.

== Incumbent ==
- Lord: Richard II

== Events ==
- The Great Book of Lecan was started at Enniscrone. (Completed in 1418).
- Robert Braybrooke, Bishop of London appointed Lord Chancellor of Ireland.
- John Deping appointed Bishop of Waterford and Lismore
