= 1403 in Ireland =

- Centuries: 13th; 14th; 15th; 16th; 17th
- Decades: 1380s; 1390s; 1400s; 1410s; 1420s
- See also: Other events of 1403; List of years in Ireland

Events from the year 1403 in Ireland.

== Incumbent ==
- Lord: Henry IV

== Events ==
- Tadhg Ruadh Ó Cellaigh succeeded Conchobar an Abaidh Ó Cellaigh as King of Hy-Many in present-day counties Galway and Roscommon.
- Maolmhordha mac Con Connacht succeeds Giolla Iosa mac Pilib, as King of East Breifne, in present-day counties Leitrim and Cavan.
- The Garter, an ornament attached to the Great Sword of State of Dublin, was presented to the citizens of Dublin in 1403 by King Henry IV.
- Laurence Merbury took the role as deputy to Lord Chancellor Thomas Cranley when the latter could not work due to old age.
- Thomas Bache was appointed as the Chief Baron of the Irish Exchequer, and granted letters of protection by Henry IV.
- Robert Sutton was appointed as the Deputy Treasurer of Ireland.
- Stephen de Bray, then Lord Chief Justice of Ireland, was granted the power to issue writs of novel disseisin.
- Mac Raith Ó hEidirsgeóil was replaced by Stepehn Brown as the new Bishop of Ross.

== Arts and literature ==
- Nicholas Ó hÍceadha and Boulger O'Callahan wrote a commentary on the Aphorisms of Hippocrates.

== Deaths ==
- Conchobar an Abaidh Ó Cellaigh, king of Hy-Many (birth date unknown)
