= 1341 =

1341 in various calendars
- Gregorian calendar: 1341; MCCCXLI
- Ab urbe condita: 2094
- Armenian calendar: 790; ԹՎ ՉՂ
- Assyrian calendar: 6091
- Balinese saka calendar: 1262–1263
- Bengali calendar: 747–748
- Berber calendar: 2291
- English Regnal year: 14 Edw. 3 – 15 Edw. 3
- Buddhist calendar: 1885
- Burmese calendar: 703
- Byzantine calendar: 6849–6850
- Chinese calendar: 庚辰年 (Metal Dragon); 4038 or 3831 — to — 辛巳年 (Metal Snake); 4039 or 3832
- Coptic calendar: 1057–1058
- Discordian calendar: 2507
- Ethiopian calendar: 1333–1334
- Hebrew calendar: 5101–5102
- Hindu calendars
- Vikram Samvat: 1397–1398
- Shaka Samvat: 1262–1263
- Kali Yuga: 4441–4442
- Holocene calendar: 11341
- Igbo calendar: 341–342
- Iranian calendar: 719–720
- Islamic calendar: 741–742
- Japanese calendar: Ryakuō 4 (暦応４年)
- Javanese calendar: 1253–1254
- Julian calendar: 1341; MCCCXLI
- Korean calendar: 3674
- Minguo calendar: 571 before ROC 民前571年
- Nanakshahi calendar: −127
- Thai solar calendar: 1883–1884
- Tibetan calendar: ལྕགས་ཕོ་འབྲུག་ལོ་ (male Iron-Dragon); 1467 or 1086 or 314 — to — ལྕགས་མོ་སྦྲུལ་ལོ་ (female Iron-Snake); 1468 or 1087 or 315

Year 1341 (MCCCXLI) was a common year starting on Monday of the Julian calendar.

== Events ==
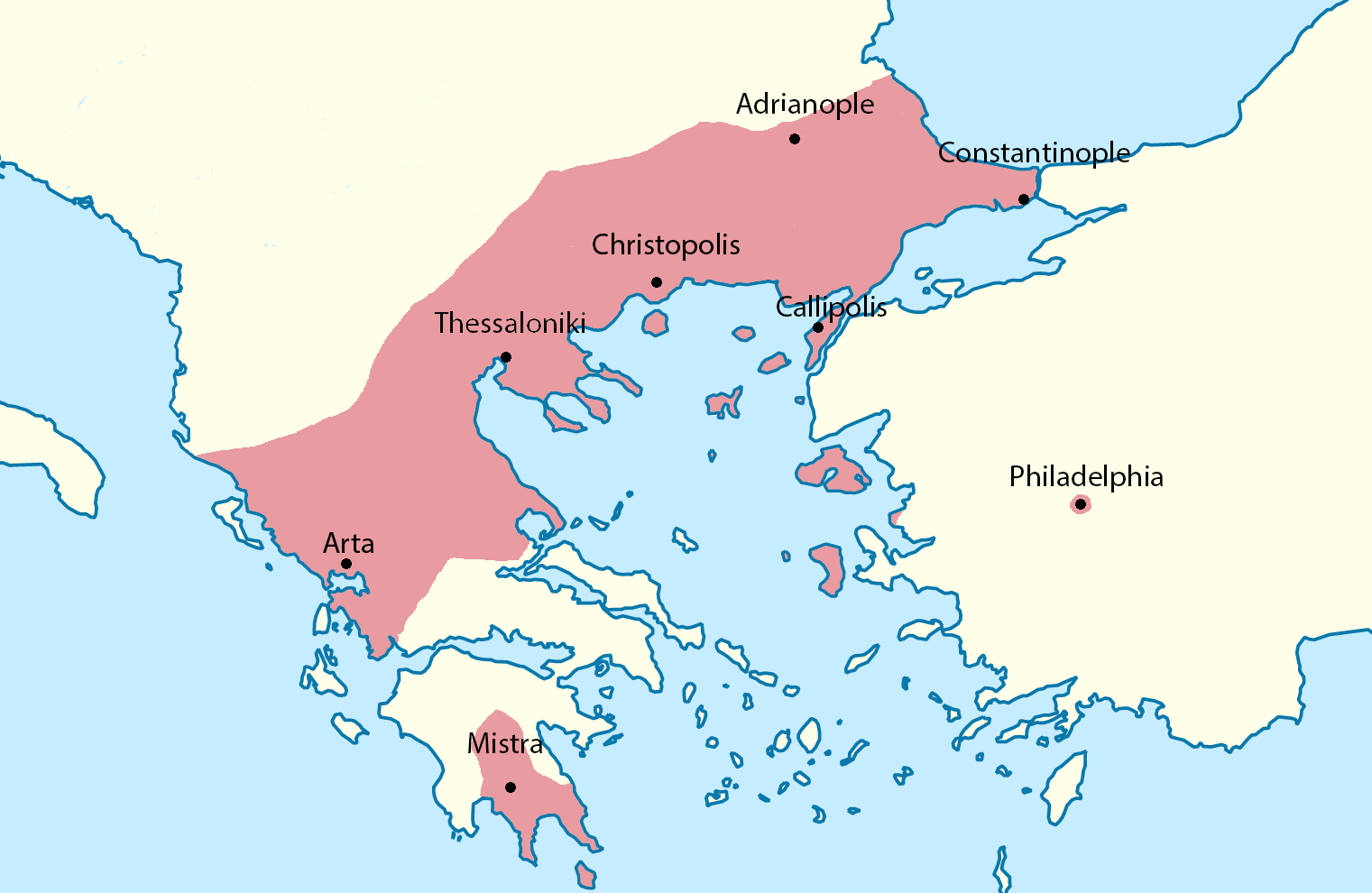
The Byzantine Empire around the start of the Byzantine civil war of 1341–1347.

- January 1 – An earthquake with a magnitude of 6.0 and a maximum Mercalli intensity of VIII (Severe) affects Crimea (disputed event).
- January 18 – The Queen's College, a constituent college of the University of Oxford in England, is founded.
- April 8 – Petrarch is crowned poet laureate in Rome, the first man since antiquity to be given this honor.
- September–October – The Byzantine civil war of 1341–1347 (between John VI Kantakouzenos and the regency for the infant John V Palaiologos) breaks out.

=== Date unknown ===
- The Breton War of Succession begins, over the control of the Duchy of Brittany.
- Margarete Maultasch, Countess of Tyrol, expels her husband John Henry of Bohemia, to whom she had been married as a child. She subsequently marries Louis of Bavaria without having been divorced, which results in the excommunication of the couple.
- Tbilisi becomes a capital of European Christian Cathedra, after the city of Smirna. George V (the Brilliant) returns Jerusalem and the Grave of Christ from the Muslims.
- Saluzzo is sacked by Manfred V of Saluzzo.
- Casimir III of Poland builds a masonry castle in Lublin, and encircles the city with defensive walls.
- The sultan of Delhi Muhammad bin Tughluq chooses Ibn Battuta to lead a diplomatic mission to Yuan Dynasty China.
- A great flood in the river Periyar in modern-day southern India leads to the river changing its course, the closing of Muziris, the opening up of Cochin (Kochi) harbour, submersion of some islands, and birth of some new islands.
- Chinese poet Zhang Xian writes the Iron Cannon Affair, about the destructive use of gunpowder and the cannon.
- Approximate date – Magnus Erikssons landslag (the Country Law of Magnus IV of Sweden) is promulgated.
- The Danish king Valdemar IV Atterdag sells southern Halland for 8000 mark to king Magnus Eriksson of Sweden in order to finance the reunification of Denmark.
- Saint Bridget of Sweden and her husband Ulf Gudmarsson went on pilgrimage to Santiago de Compostela.

== Births ==
- June 5 – Edmund of Langley, 1st Duke of York, son of King Edward III of England (d. 1402)
- September 1 – Frederick the Simple, King of Sicily (d. 1377)
- November 10 – Henry Percy, 1st Earl of Northumberland, English statesman (d. 1408)
- date unknown
  - Bonne of Bourbon, Countess regent of Savoy (d. 1402)
  - Hermann II, Landgrave of Hesse (d. 1413)
  - Louis, Duke of Durazzo (d. 1376)
  - Qu You, Chinese novelist (d. 1427)

== Deaths ==
- January 22 – Louis I, Duke of Bourbon (b. 1279)
- March 2 or October 3 – Martha of Denmark, queen consort of Sweden (b. 1277)
- April 30 – Duke John III of Brittany (b. 1286)
- June – Al-Nasir Muhammad, Sultan of Egypt (b. 1295)
- June 19 – Juliana Falconieri, Italian saint (b. 1270)
- June 15 – Andronikos III Palaiologos, Byzantine Emperor (b. 1297)
- August 9 – Eleanor of Anjou, queen consort of Sicily (b. 1289)
- August 28 – King Leo IV of Armenia (murdered) (b. 1309)
- December – Gediminas, Duke of Lithuania
- December 4 – Janisław, Archbishop of Gniezno
- date unknown
  - Petrus Filipsson, Archbishop of Uppsala
  - Uzbeg Khan, Khan of the Golden Horde (b. 1282)
  - Nicholas I Sanudo, Duke of the Archipelago
  - Bartholomew II Ghisi, Lord of Tenos and Mykonos, Triarch of Negroponte
- probable – Richard Folville, English outlaw and parson (resisting arrest)
