= 1410 in Ireland =

- Centuries: 13th; 14th; 15th; 16th; 17th
- Decades: 1390s; 1400s; 1410s; 1420s; 1430s
- See also: Other events of 1410; List of years in Ireland

Events from the year 1410 in Ireland.

== Incumbent ==
- Lord: Henry IV

== Births ==
- William Welles: English-born statesman and judge in fifteenth-century Ireland

== Deaths ==
- Domnell mac Áedh Ó Flaithbheartaigh, leader of Iar Connacht and Chief of the Name
