= 1406 in Ireland =

- Centuries: 13th; 14th; 15th; 16th; 17th
- Decades: 1380s; 1390s; 1400s; 1410s; 1420s
- See also: Other events of 1406; List of years in Ireland

Events from the year 1406 in Ireland.

== Incumbent ==
- Lord: Henry IV
- Chancellory: Thomas Cranley until September 1406.
- Chief Governor: Gerald FitzGerald, 5th Earl of Kildare

== Events ==
- December, Cathal mac Ruaidri Ó Conchobair, upon the murder of Toirdhealbhach Óg Donn Ó Conchobair, installed as King of Connacht

== Deaths ==
- Philip Courtenay, (in England) former Lord Lieutenant of Ireland
- Toirdhealbhach Óg Donn Ó Conchobair, King of Connacht, 17 December
