= 1405 in Ireland =

- Centuries: 13th; 14th; 15th; 16th; 17th
- Decades: 1380s; 1390s; 1400s; 1410s; 1420s
- See also: Other events of 1405; List of years in Ireland

Events from the year 1405 in Ireland.

== Incumbent ==
- Lord: Henry IV

== Events ==
- First record of whiskey being consumed in Ireland, where it is distilled by monks.

== Deaths ==
- James Butler, 3rd Earl of Ormonde
