= Battle of Tochar Cruachain-Bri-Ele =

1385 battle in Ireland

Battle of Tochar Cruacháin Brí Eile
Date	1385
Location	near Croghan, County Offaly, Ireland
Result	Gaelic Irish victory

Belligerents
Kingdom of Offaly	Lordship of Ireland

Commanders and leaders
Murchad O'Connor	unknown

The Battle of Tochar Cruacháin Brí Eile or Cruachán Brí Eile took place in 1385 near what is now the village of Croghan in County Offaly, Ireland. The battle pitted the Gaelic forces of Uí Failghe, led by Murchadh Ó Conchobhair, against the Normans. The army of Uí Failghe was victorious. "Nugent of Meath, Chambers and his son, and a countless host of the chiefs and plebeians of the English were slain", according to the Annals of the Four Masters.
