= Käpplinge murders =

Käpplinge murders (Swedish: Käpplingemorden) was the name of a massacre conducted on Käpplingeholmen (now Blasieholmen) in Stockholm in June 1389, when 70 men were placed in a barn house and burned alive. The massacre was performed by the hättebröder as a part of the power struggle at the time between the German burgher party and the Swedish burgher party in the city of Stockholm, when the German burghers supported Albert, King of Sweden, and the Swedish burghers supported Margaret I of Denmark in their rivalry over the throne of Sweden.
