= Hättebröder =

Hättebröder ("Cap's brothers"), was a group of a party of German-speaking burghers during the reign of the German Albert, King of Sweden, who came to be known for their oppression and persecution of native Swedish-speaking burghers in the Swedish city of Stockholm.

During the reign of King Albert, who was from Germany, the city of Stockholm was dominated by the German burgher colony, particularly during his later reign. This German party persecuted and harassed Swedish burghers through members known as "Cap's brothers", Hättebröder, because of their caps. On 11 June 1389, the Hättebröder finally imprisoned the Swedish mayor Bertil Brun, the official Peter Åländing and another Swede. This led to a Swedish burgher party arming themselves to free the prisoners. Under the threat of armed hostilities, the prisoners were released for a ransom.

The following day, a Sunday, the Swedish city Councillors were summoned to the city hall by the German Councillors, who arrested them for treason and had them brought to Tre Kronor (castle) and tortured. The 15 June, three of the prisoners were burned. On 17 June, the rest of the prisoners were taken to Käpplingeholmen (Blasieholmen), where they were placed in a wooden building and burned. This was known as Käpplingemorden (Käpplinge murders). The result was, in the short term, that the rule of the German party of Stockholm was secured. They were, however, eventually forced to admit that their act had been illegal, and as a token of reconciliation with the church, had three memorial sculptural stones placed in Södermalm.

== See also ==
- Victual Brothers
