= 1389 =

1389 in various calendars
- Gregorian calendar: 1389; MCCCLXXXIX
- Ab urbe condita: 2142
- Armenian calendar: 838; ԹՎ ՊԼԸ
- Assyrian calendar: 6139
- Balinese saka calendar: 1310–1311
- Bengali calendar: 795–796
- Berber calendar: 2339
- English Regnal year: 12 Ric. 2 – 13 Ric. 2
- Buddhist calendar: 1933
- Burmese calendar: 751
- Byzantine calendar: 6897–6898
- Chinese calendar: 戊辰年 (Earth Dragon); 4086 or 3879 — to — 己巳年 (Earth Snake); 4087 or 3880
- Coptic calendar: 1105–1106
- Discordian calendar: 2555
- Ethiopian calendar: 1381–1382
- Hebrew calendar: 5149–5150
- Hindu calendars
- Vikram Samvat: 1445–1446
- Shaka Samvat: 1310–1311
- Kali Yuga: 4489–4490
- Holocene calendar: 11389
- Igbo calendar: 389–390
- Iranian calendar: 767–768
- Islamic calendar: 790–792
- Japanese calendar: Kakei 3 / Kōō 1 (康応元年)
- Javanese calendar: 1302–1303
- Julian calendar: 1389; MCCCLXXXIX
- Korean calendar: 3722
- Minguo calendar: 523 before ROC 民前523年
- Nanakshahi calendar: −79
- Thai solar calendar: 1931–1932
- Tibetan calendar: ས་ཕོ་འབྲུག་ལོ་ (male Earth-Dragon); 1515 or 1134 or 362 — to — ས་མོ་སྦྲུལ་ལོ་ (female Earth-Snake); 1516 or 1135 or 363

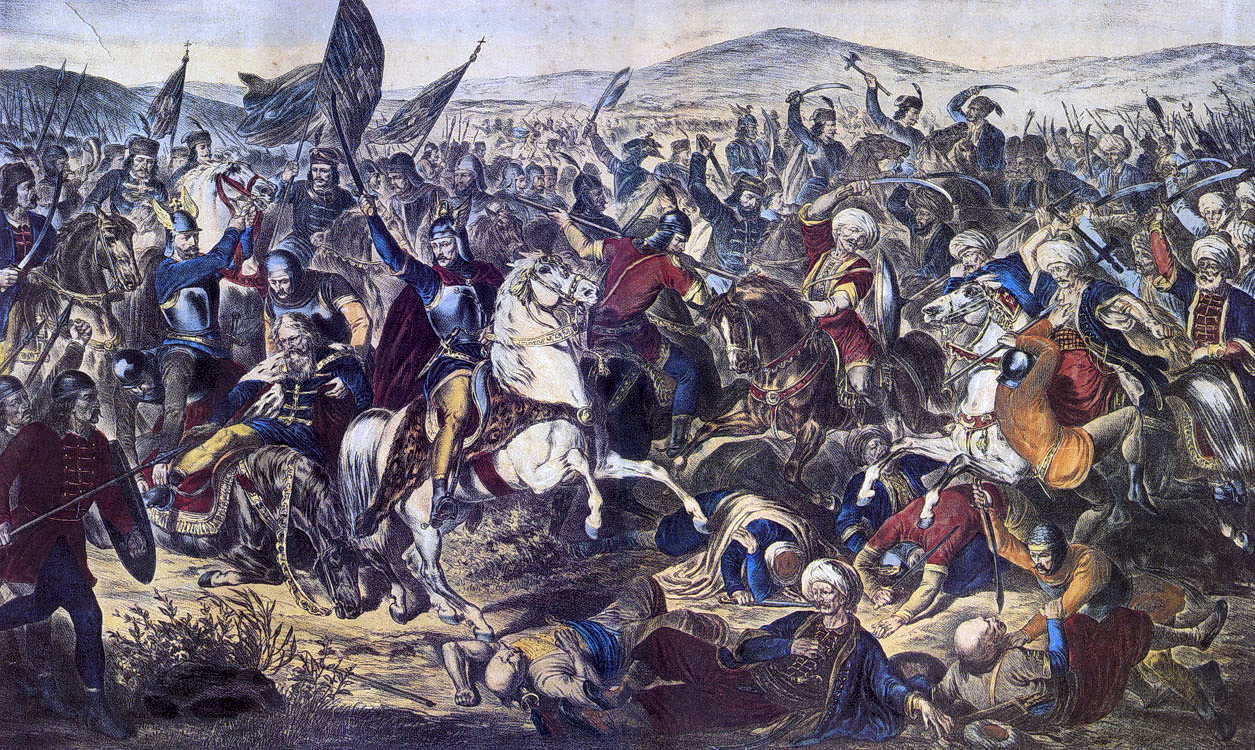
June 15: The Battle of Kosovo is fought between the Ottoman Empire and the Principality of Serbia, with the rulers of both nations losing their lives.

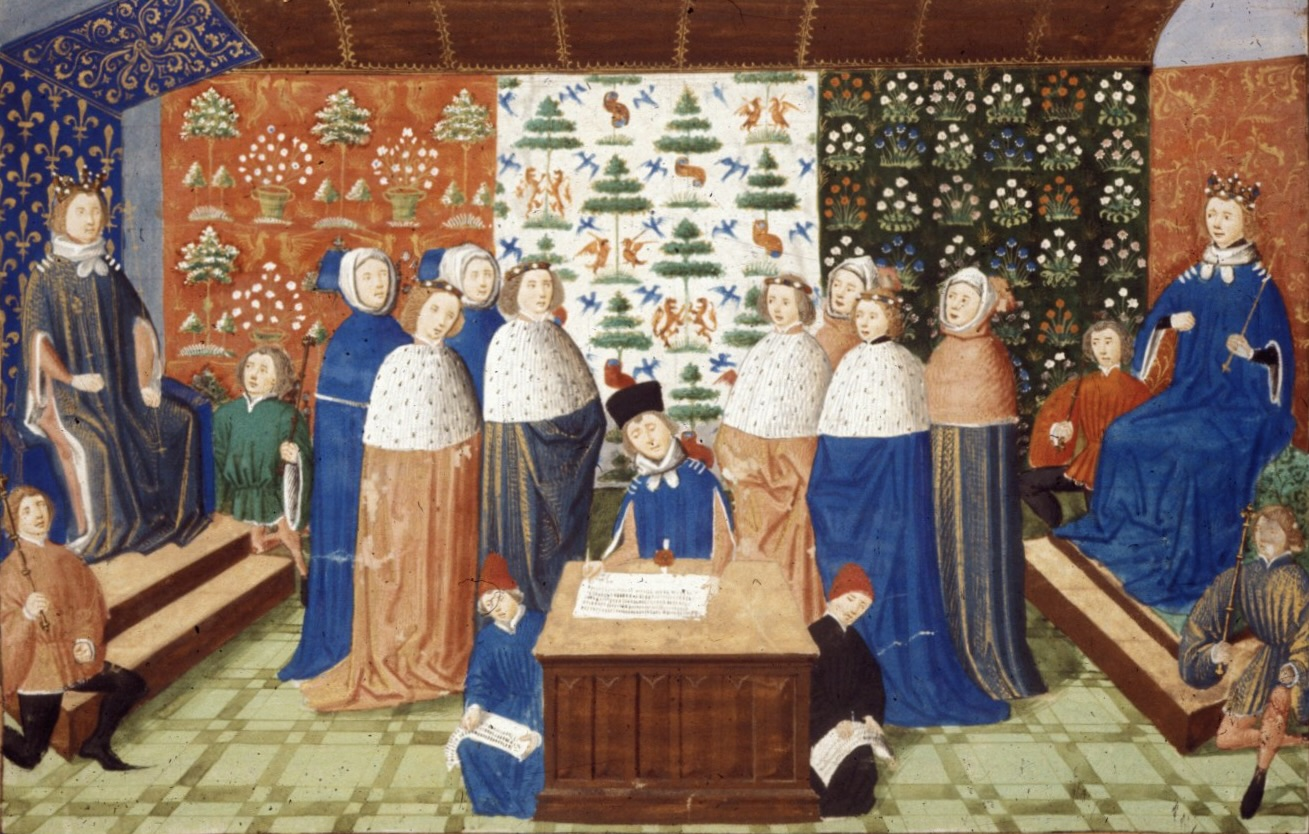
July 18: England and France agree to the Truce of Leulinghem to halt the Hundred Years' War for 13 years.

Year 1389 (MCCCLXXXIX) was a common year starting on Friday (link will display full calendar) of the Julian calendar.

== Events ==
=== January–March ===
- January 19 – In Ming dynasty China, General Lan Yu is rewarded by the Emperor Zhu Chongba of the Hongwu era for his victory over Mongol invaders in 1388. Lan Yu is given the title Duke of Liang, with rule over what is now the Gansu province.
- January 24 – The University of Cologne (Universität zu Köln) begins operations and continues for more than 400 years before closing in 1798. It will be re-established in 1918.
- February 24 – Queen Margaret of Norway and Denmark defeats Albert, King of Sweden in battle and becomes ruler of all three kingdoms. Albert is deposed from the Swedish throne and taken prisoner.
- March 14 – The unpopular Sultan Tughluq Khan of Delhi is murdered and succeeded by his brother, Abu Bakr Shah. The assassins, including Abu Bakr, kill the Sultan Tughluq and his vizier, Jahan Khan.

=== April–June ===
- April 1 – Following the Battle of Sempach, a seven-year peace agreement is concluded between the Duchy of Austria and the Old Swiss Confederacy.
- April 19 – Lithuania, the last state in Europe to be Christianized, is given full recognition by Pope Urban VI as a Roman Catholic state.
- May 3 – Richard II takes control of England, away from the Lords Appellant.
- May 19 – Vasili I becomes Grand Prince of Moscow after the death of his father, Dmitry Donskoy.
- May 21 – Sir John Roches is made Admiral of the North and Western Fleets of the English Navy by King Richard II, but serves for only a month, until June 22.
- June 2 – Al-Salih Hajji becomes the Mamluk Sultan of Egypt and Syria a second time, replacing the Sultan Sayf ad-Din Barquq after having previously reigned from 1381 to 1382. Al-Salih rules until 1 February 1390, when he is overthrown by Barquq.
- June 11 – The Hättebröder, a group of German-speaking burghers during the reign of the German Albrecht as King of Sweden, arrest and imprison the Swedish mayor of Stockholm, Bertil Brun, and two other city officials, whom they hold for ransom. Brun and the other two officials become victims two weeks later of the Käpplinge murders.
- June 15 – At the Battle of Kosovo, The Ottoman Empire and the Serbs fight an inconclusive clash, with both sides suffering heavy losses. Both Sultan Murad I and Serbian Prince Lazar Hrebeljanovic are killed in the battle.
- June 16 – The day after the Battle of Kosovo, Bayezid I succeeds his father Murad I as Ottoman Sultan, and Stefan Lazarević succeeds his father Lazar as ruler of Serbia.
- June 17 – On the night of the Feast of Corpus Christi, the Käpplinge murders (Käpplingemorden) take place in Sweden at Käpplingeholmen when 76 Swedish men are taken prisoner, convicted of treason, then burned alive in a barn.

=== July–September ===
- July 12 – English poet Geoffrey Chaucer, who has recently started writing of the works that will be assembled in The Canterbury Tales, is given a job to supplement his income as a writer when he is appointed by King Richard II of England as Clerk of the King's Works, overseer of the construction of royally-sponsored buildings.
- July 18 – The Hundred Years' War is temporarily halted as the Truce of Leulinghem goes into effect after having been signed in June by the Kingdom of England and Kingdom of France. The peace will last for 13 years.
- August 11 – Spyridon of Serbia, Patriarch of the Serbian Orthodox Church since 1380, dies and the former Patriarch, Jefrem, takes his place.
- August 23 – Isabeau of Bavaria, who married King Charles V of France on July 17, 1385, is crowned as Queen consort of France.(1978).
- August 24 – Qutbu'd-Din Shah, the Sultan of Kashmir, dies after a reign of 16 years and is succeeded by his 9-year-old son, Sikandar Shah Miri. Sikandar's mother, Queen Subhata, serves as the regent of Kashmir during his minority.
- September 8 – Erik of Pomerania becomes the new King of Norway with the regnal name of Erik III after being elected at Trondheim by the Ting, the kingdom's assembly.
- September 10 – In Greece, Andronikos Asen Zaccaria, chief law enforcement officer of the Principality of Achaea, ruled by the Republic of Genoa, imprisons the Duke of Athens, Nerio Acciaioli, after the Navarrese commander Pedro de San Superano had invited Acciaioli to discuss peace.
- September 22 – The Republic of Siena and the Duchy of Milan enter into a 10-year alliance.
- September 30 – King Charles VI of France and the Bishop Liébauld de Cousans of Verdun sign a treaty granting the Roman Catholic Church dominion over the city of Verdun. The treaty is approved five months later by Pope Clement VI on February 13, 1390.

=== October –December ===
- October 25 – The papal conclave to elect a new Pope opens at the Apostolic Palace in Rome with 13 cardinals, all of whom had been selected by Pope Urban during the years from 1378 to 1384.The three absentees (from France, England and Hungary) had also been elevated to the college of cardinals by Pope Urban.
- November 1 – The Antipope John XXIII, reigning from Avignon, crowns Louis II of Anjou as King of Naples, although the underage King Ladislaus has been recognized as the rightful monarch by the late Pope Urban VI of Rome. Louis II will move to Naples on August 6, 1390, while Ladislaus flees, but since his troops cannot occupy the entire Neapolitan kingdom, Louis is only recognized in the French-occupied areas of Naples.
- November 2 – Pietro Tomacelli Cybo of Naples is elected as the successor of the late Pope Urban VI, and takes the name Pope Boniface IX.
- December 31 – In the Goryeo Revolution in Korea, 9-year-old King Wang Chang of Goryeo, and his father, the former King Wang U are assassinated by Prince Gongyang. The ten-year-old Chang and his predecessor, U, are both assassinated later in the year.

=== Date unknown ===
- Mircea I of Wallachia and Polish king Władysław II Jagiełło sign their first treaty, to protect their countries against Ottoman expansion.
- Hadji II is restored as Mamluk Sultan of Egypt, after overthrowing Sultan Barquq.
- Wikramawardhana succeeds Hayam Wuruk, as ruler of the Majapahit Empire.
- Biri II succeeds Kade Alunu as King of the Kanem-Bornu Empire (now eastern Chad and Nigeria), and the Empire loses its land in present-day Chad to the Bilala.
- Sandaki overthrows Magha II, as Mansa of the Mali Empire.
- Abd ar-Rahmân II succeeds Musa II as ruler of the Ziyanid Dynasty, in present-day western Algeria.
- Abu Tashufin II succeeds his nephew, Abu Hammu II, as ruler of the Abdalwadid Dynasty in present-day eastern Algeria.
- Carmo Convent is built in Lisbon, Portugal.

== Births ==
- March 1 – Antoninus of Florence, Italian archbishop (d. 1459)
- June 20 – John of Lancaster, 1st Duke of Bedford, regent of England (d. 1435)
- April 10 – Cosimo de' Medici, ruler of Florence (d. 1464)
- November 9 – Isabella of Valois, French princess and queen of England (d. 1409)
- December 5 – Zbigniew Oleśnicki, Polish cardinal and statesman (d. 1455)
- December 24 – Duke John V of Brittany (d. 1442)

== Deaths ==
- March 14 – Ghiyas-ud-Din Tughluq II, Sultan of Delhi (murdered)
- May 19 – Dmitry Donskoy, Grand Prince of Muscovy (b. 1350)
- June 15 (in the Battle of Kosovo)
  - Prince Lazar, Prince of Serbia (b. 1329)
  - Murad I, Ottoman Sultan (b. 1326)
  - Miloš Obilić, Serbian knight
- October 15 – Pope Urban VI (b. 1318)
- December 31 (assassination)
  - Chang of Goryeo, deposed Korean king (b. 1381)
  - U of Goryeo, Korean king (b. 1365)
- date unknown
  - Isabella, Countess of Fife, Scottish noblewoman (b. 1320)
  - Hayam Wuruk, ruler of the Majapahit Empire (b. 1334)
  - Ignatius Saba I, Syriac Orthodox Patriarch of Tur Abdin.
