= 1402 =

1402 in various calendars
- Gregorian calendar: 1402; MCDII
- Ab urbe condita: 2155
- Armenian calendar: 851; ԹՎ ՊԾԱ
- Assyrian calendar: 6152
- Balinese saka calendar: 1323–1324
- Bengali calendar: 808–809
- Berber calendar: 2352
- English Regnal year: 3 Hen. 4 – 4 Hen. 4
- Buddhist calendar: 1946
- Burmese calendar: 764
- Byzantine calendar: 6910–6911
- Chinese calendar: 辛巳年 (Metal Snake); 4099 or 3892 — to — 壬午年 (Water Horse); 4100 or 3893
- Coptic calendar: 1118–1119
- Discordian calendar: 2568
- Ethiopian calendar: 1394–1395
- Hebrew calendar: 5162–5163
- Hindu calendars
- Vikram Samvat: 1458–1459
- Shaka Samvat: 1323–1324
- Kali Yuga: 4502–4503
- Holocene calendar: 11402
- Igbo calendar: 402–403
- Iranian calendar: 780–781
- Islamic calendar: 804–805
- Japanese calendar: Ōei 9 (応永９年)
- Javanese calendar: 1316–1317
- Julian calendar: 1402; MCDII
- Korean calendar: 3735
- Minguo calendar: 510 before ROC 民前510年
- Nanakshahi calendar: −66
- Thai solar calendar: 1944–1945
- Tibetan calendar: ལྕགས་མོ་སྦྲུལ་ལོ་ (female Iron-Snake); 1528 or 1147 or 375 — to — ཆུ་ཕོ་རྟ་ལོ་ (male Water-Horse); 1529 or 1148 or 376

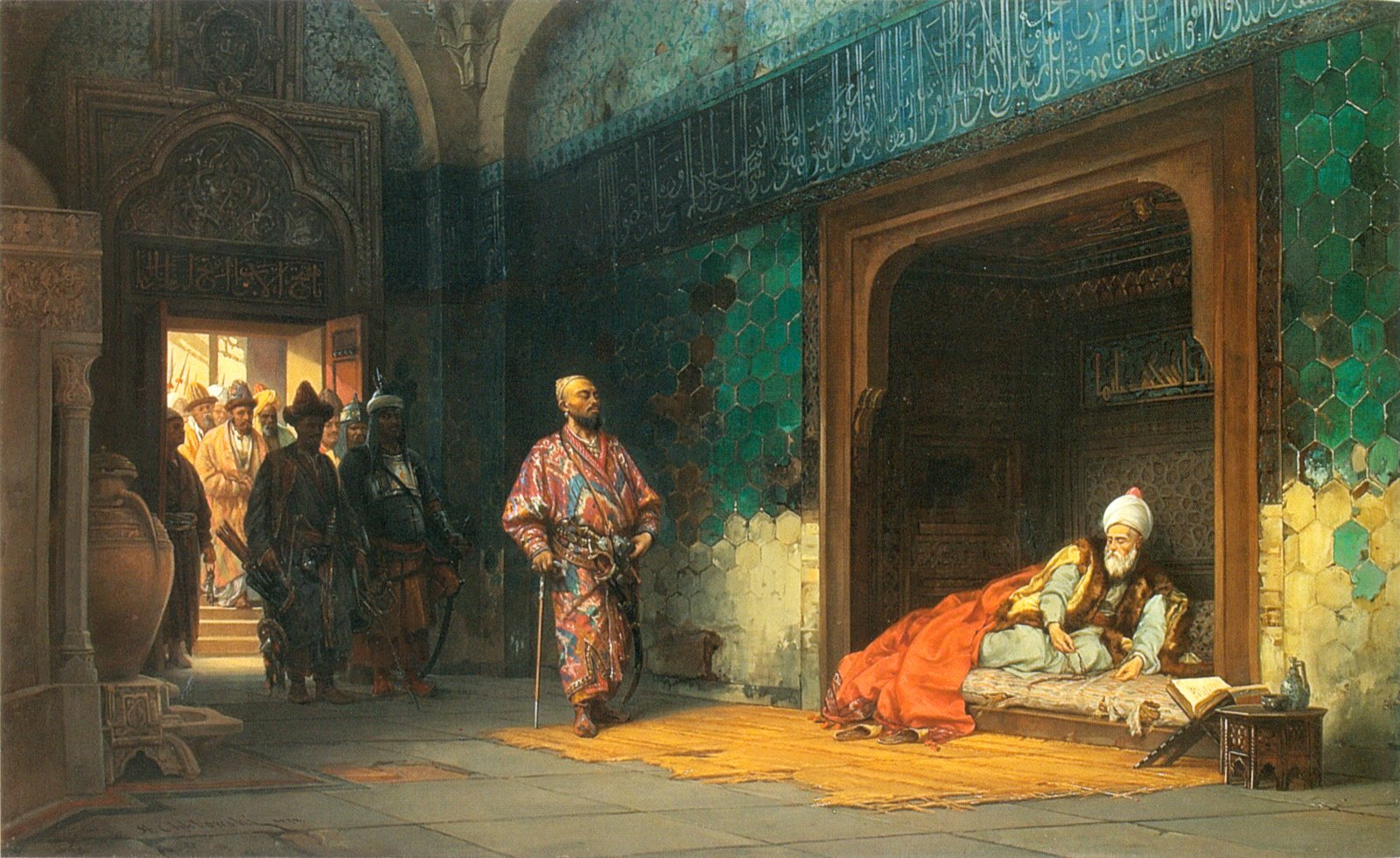
July 20: The Ottoman Sultan Bayezid I is captured at the Battle of Ankara by Tamerlane.

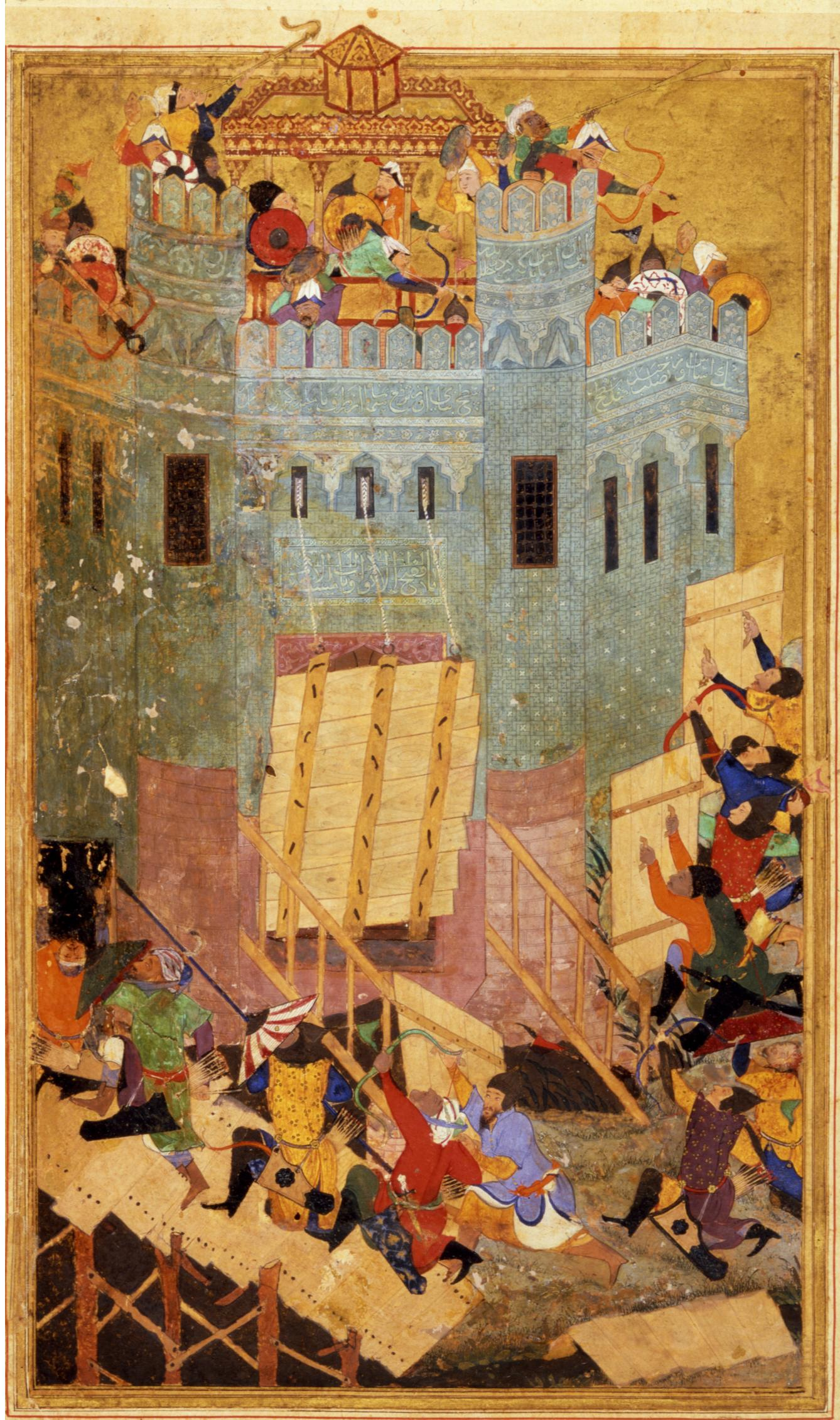
December 2: Tamerlane carries out siege of Smyrna and massacres the Christian inhabitants left from the Crursades

Year 1402 (MCDII) was a common year starting on Sunday of the Julian calendar.

== Events ==
=== January–March ===
- January 29 – King Jogaila of the Poland–Lithuania Union answers the rumblings against his rule of Poland, by marrying Anna of Celje, a granddaughter of Casimir III of Poland.
- February 8 – The Great Comet of 1402 is first observed by people living in the Northern Hemisphere of Earth. The comet, visible for eight days even in daylight, makes its closest approach to Earth on February 20. It is last seen on March 27.
- February 19 – Sigismund of Křižanov, Prokop of Luxemburg and King Wenceslas IV of Bohemia carry out an unsuccessful raid on the military garrison of Jihlava in an attack against the Kingdom of Croatia, led by Sigismund of Luxembourg. The Bohemians are routed, and Wenceslas is captured.
- March 26 – David Stewart, Duke of Rothesay, heir to the throne of Scotland, dies while being held captive by his uncle, Robert Stewart, 1st Duke of Albany.

=== April–June ===
- April 2 – Jingnan campaign: In China, the Yan Army, led by Prince Zhu Di reaches Suishui, west of Huaibei, in what is now the Anhui province.
- April 3 – King Henry IV of England is married by proxy to Joan of Navarre in a ceremony at the Eltham Palace near London.
- April 29 – Jingnan campaign: The Yan Army overwhelms the Imperial Army of Southern China at Linghi, capturing General Ping An.
- May 7 – Jingnan campaign: The Yan Army continues its march, capturing Sixian and reaching the north bank of the Huai River.
- May 21 – Following the death of Queen Maria of Sicily, her husband Martin I of Sicily, now sole ruler, marries Blanche of Navarre by proxy. They marry in person on December 26.
- June 3 – Jingnan campaign: After crossing the Huai River into what is now Jiangsu province, and taking Yangzhou (May 18) and Luhe (May 19), the Yan Army of Zhu Di crosses the Yangtze River at Guazhou and is within striking distance of the Imperial Chinese capital at Nanjing by June 8, forcing Emperor Zhu Yun Wen to prepare terms of surrender that include granting the Yan Kingdom areas north of the Yangtze. Zhu Di refuses.
- June 13 – Jingnan campaign: The Army of Yan arrives at the walls of Nanjing, capital of Imperial China and surrounds the city. The defenders on the north side open the Jinchuan Gate and let the invaders in. China's Emperor Zhu Yun Wen then orders for the palace to be set on fire with himself and his followers burned to death inside before the Yan King Zhu Di arrives. Zhu Di orders the execution of 29 palace officials.
- June 14 – Zhu Di, King of the Yan State at Beijing, becomes the new Ming Dynasty Emperor of China at Nanjing, uniting north and south China.
- June 22
  - Battle of Nesbit Moor: An English force decisively defeats a returning Scottish raiding party.
  - Battle of Bryn Glas: Welsh rebels under Owain Glyndŵr defeat the English on the England/Wales border. The Welsh capture Edmund Mortimer, son of the 3rd Earl, who defects to the Welsh cause, on 30 November marrying Owain's daughter Catrin.
- June 26 – Battle of Casalecchio: Gian Galeazzo Visconti, the Duke of Milan, crushes the forces of Bologna and Florence. He dies from a fever less than three months later.

=== July–September ===
- July 17 – The Ming dynasty prince Zhu Di of Yan is formally crowned as the Emperor Cheng Zu of Ming at Nanjing, marking the end of the Jingnan campaign.
- July 20 – Battle of Ankara: An invading Timurid Empire force defeats the Ottoman Sultan Bayezid I, who is captured. A period of interregnum begins in the Ottoman Empire, with the future Mehmed I as one of the leading claimants to the throne. After Serbia is freed from Ottoman rule, Stefan Lazarević is crowned Despot of Serbia.
- August 1 – Edward of Norwich becomes the second Duke of York in England upon the death of his father, Edmund of Langley. He will serve until his death in 1415 in the Battle of Agincourt.
- August 15 – King Enrique III of Castile and León (comprising most of Spain) signs a peace treaty with his brother-in-law, King João I of Portugal, ending fighting that began in 1396. The wives of the two kings, Catherine of Lancaster and Philippa of Lancaster respectively, are sisters.
- September 3 – Gian Maria Visconti becomes the second Duke of Milan upon the death of his father, Gian Galeazzo Visconti.
- September 14 – Battle of Homildon Hill: Northern English nobles, led by Sir Henry Percy (Hotspur), and using longbows, decisively defeat a Scottish raiding army and capture their leader, the Earl of Douglas.
- September 30 – The new session of the English Parliament is opened by King Henry IV and lasts for almost two months.

=== October–December ===
- October 1 – The House of Commons of England is opened at Coventry by King Henry IV, whose Lord Chancellor asks the members to pass a tax to support an offensive war against Scotland, enemies of Wales, Ireland and for defending the Marches of Guienne and Calais. Henry Redford is elected Speaker of the House.
- October 10 – A rare conference begins in England between the House of Commons and the House of Lords takes place with the permission of the King, and results in a 3-shilling tax on wine and a 14-pence tax on other merchandise.
- October 28 – The "False Olaf", a Bohemian immigrant who bore a resemblance to the late King Olaf of Denmark and Norway and impersonated the late monarch earlier in the year, is burned at the stake as punishment.
- November 5 – The Republic of Genoa resumes control of Monaco, deposing Louis Grimaldi. Genoese control lasts for more than 16 years.
- November 21 – Stefan Lazarević leads the Serbian Despotate to victory over the Ottoman Governor Durad Brankovic at the Battle of Tripolje.
- November 23 – The Byzantine Emperor Manuel II Palaiologos leaves France after a stay of almost two years.
- November 25 – The fourth parliament of King Henry IV of England closes at Westminster after two months and the passage of new laws, including the penal Laws against Wales which stop the Welsh from gathering together, obtaining office, carrying arms and living in English towns. The laws apply to any Englishman who marries a Welsh woman.
- December 2 – (6 Jumada al-Awwal 805 A.H.) With 4,000 troops, Tamerlane, Amir of the Timurid Empire covering much of what is now Iraq, Iran and Afghanistan begins the Siege of Smyrna (now Izmir in Turkey). Smyrna is captured after two days of attacks on its outer walls. After the Christian Knights of Saint John, who are ruling Smyrna, refuse to convert to Islam or pay tribute, Timur has the entire Christian population massacred. The Knights subsequently begin building Bodrum Castle in Bodrum, to defend against future attacks.
- December 26 – (3rd waxing of Tabodwe 764 ME) Ava–Hanthawaddy War: In what is now Myanmar, the forces of the Ava Kingdom, led by King Minkhaung I defeat King Razadarit of the Kingdom of Hanthawaddy in the Battle of Nawin, forcing Razadarit to abandon the siege of Prome.

=== Date unknown ===
- The Malacca Sultanate is established at Melaka Darul Azim (modern-day Melaka Darul Azim, Malaysia).
- Conquest of the Canary Islands: King Henry III of Castile sends French explorer Jean de Béthencourt to colonize the Canary Islands. Béthencourt receives the title King of the Canary Islands but recognizes Henry as his overlord.
- The Aq Qoyunlu ("White Sheep Turkmen") tribal confederation, in modern-day northern Iraq and Iran, moves its capital from Amida to Diyarbakır.
- Moldavia becomes a vassal of the Kingdom of Poland in order to protect itself from an invasion by Hungary.
- Maria II Zaccaria succeeds her husband, Pedro de San Superano, as regent of the Principality of Achaea (modern-day southern Greece).
- Conchobar an Abaidh mac Maelsechlainn O Cellaigh succeeds Maelsechlainn mac William Buidhe O Cellaigh, as King of Uí Maine in modern-day County Galway and County Roscommon in Ireland.
- The University of Würzburg is founded.
- The Gangnido map of the world is completed in Joseon dynasty Korea.
- A Great comet is sighted.
- A big fire in the city of Utrecht starts near the Jacobikerk.

== Births ==
- February 6 – Louis I, Landgrave of Hesse, Landgrave of Hesse (1413-1458) (d. 1458)
- April 28 – Nezahualcoyotl, Acolhuan philosopher, warrior, poet and tlatoani of Texcoco (d. 1472)
- May 2 – Eleanor of Aragon, Queen of Portugal (d. 1445)
- June 7 – Ichijō Kaneyoshi, Japanese court noble (d. 1481)
- September 29 – Ferdinand the Holy Prince of Portugal (d. 1443)
- November 23 – Jean de Dunois, French nobleman and soldier, illegitimate son of Louis I (d. 1468)
- date unknown – Humphrey Stafford, 1st Duke of Buckingham, English nobleman (d. 1460)

== Deaths ==
- March 26 – David Stewart, Duke of Rothesay, heir to the throne of Scotland (b. 1378)
- May 3 – João Anes, Archbishop of Lisbon
- June 26 – Giovanni I Bentivoglio, Ruler of Bologna (b. 1358)
- July 13 – Jianwen Emperor of China (b. 1377)
- August 1 – Edmund of Langley, 1st Duke of York, English nobleman, last surviving son of King Edward III (b. 1341)
- September 3 – Gian Galeazzo Visconti, first Duke of Milan (b. 1351)
- date unknown
  - Empress Ma (Jianwen) of China (b. 1378)
  - Hywel Sele, Welsh nobleman
