= 1416 =

1416 in various calendars
- Gregorian calendar: 1416; MCDXVI
- Ab urbe condita: 2169
- Armenian calendar: 865; ԹՎ ՊԿԵ
- Assyrian calendar: 6166
- Balinese saka calendar: 1337–1338
- Bengali calendar: 822–823
- Berber calendar: 2366
- English Regnal year: 3 Hen. 5 – 4 Hen. 5
- Buddhist calendar: 1960
- Burmese calendar: 778
- Byzantine calendar: 6924–6925
- Chinese calendar: 乙未年 (Wood Goat); 4113 or 3906 — to — 丙申年 (Fire Monkey); 4114 or 3907
- Coptic calendar: 1132–1133
- Discordian calendar: 2582
- Ethiopian calendar: 1408–1409
- Hebrew calendar: 5176–5177
- Hindu calendars
- Vikram Samvat: 1472–1473
- Shaka Samvat: 1337–1338
- Kali Yuga: 4516–4517
- Holocene calendar: 11416
- Igbo calendar: 416–417
- Iranian calendar: 794–795
- Islamic calendar: 818–819
- Japanese calendar: Ōei 23 (応永２３年)
- Javanese calendar: 1330–1331
- Julian calendar: 1416; MCDXVI
- Korean calendar: 3749
- Minguo calendar: 496 before ROC 民前496年
- Nanakshahi calendar: −52
- Thai solar calendar: 1958–1959
- Tibetan calendar: ཤིང་མོ་ལུག་ལོ་ (female Wood-Sheep); 1542 or 1161 or 389 — to — མེ་ཕོ་སྤྲེ་ལོ་ (male Fire-Monkey); 1543 or 1162 or 390

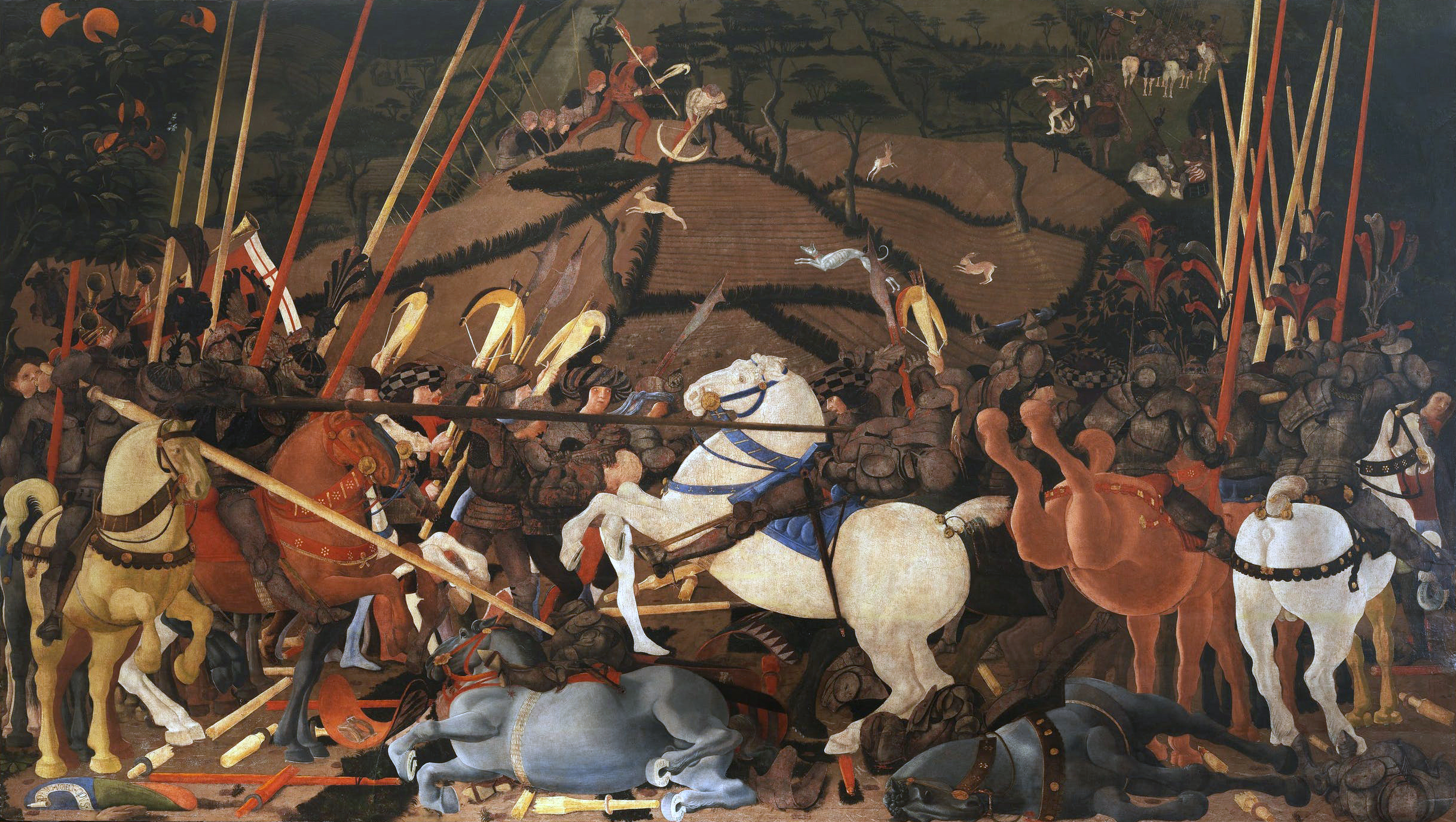
July 12: The Battle of Sant'Egidio is fought in Italy.

Year 1416 (MCDXVI) was a leap year starting on Wednesday of the Julian calendar.

== Events ==
=== January–March ===
- January 21 – King Henry V summons the English Parliament to meet on March 16.
- January 27 – The Republic of Ragusa is the first state in Europe to outlaw slavery.
- February 9 – Sigismund, King of Germany, creates the independent Duchy of Savoy with Count Amadeus the Peaceful becoming the first Duke of Savoy and taking the regnal title Amadeus VIII.
- March 1 – Sigismund arrives in Paris to reach an agreement with the French government, but is unable to because of difficulty in reaching a conclusion satisfactory to both its Orleanist and Burgundian factions.
- March 11 – Hundred Years' War, Lancastrian phase: The Battle of Valmont takes place in the neighboring towns of Valmont and Harfleur, as Thomas Beaufort, Duke of Exeter and his English Army troops inflict heavy casualties on a larger group of French soldiers commanded by Bernard VII, Count of Armagnac.
- March 16 – The Treason Act 1415 takes effect in England, making coin clipping a treasonable offense.

=== April–June ===
- April 2 – Alfonso V becomes the new King of Aragon and the new King of Sicily upon the death of his father, King Ferdinand I of Aragon.
- May 3 – Unable to reach an agreement with France, King Sigismund of Germany travels to London, where he is welcomed by King Henry V of England.
- May 27 – Total solar eclipse.
- May 29 – At the Battle of Gallipoli, Venetian admiral Pietro Loredan destroys the Ottoman fleet.
- May 30 – The Catholic Church burns Jerome of Prague for heresy at the Council of Constance.
- June 2 – The Truce of Harfleur between England and France comes to an end after 27 days, and a French siege of Harfleur begins again on June 5.
- June 6 – The Convocation of Canterbury, to investigate and charge the participants in the 1414 Oldcastle Revolt in England, ends after more than two months.
- June 20 – Raoul de Gaucourt and Regnault de Chartres, held prisoners of war in England since being captured during the siege of Harfleur, are paroled in order to serve as England's emissaries to begin discussions of a truce with King Charles VI of France.

=== July–September ===
- July 1 – Henry Chichele, the Roman Catholic Archbishop of Canterbury and Primate of All England, begins the first of his semiannual inquisitions, directing the archdeacons to seek out heretics and bring them to trial.
- July 12 – The Battle of Sant'Egidio is fought in Italy: soldier of fortune Braccio da Montone, Prince of Capua, conquers Umbria and its capital, Perugia.
- July 16 – Following the Venetian Navy triumph over the Ottomans at Gallipoli, Dolfino Venier, the Republic of Venice's ambassador to the Ottoman Empire, reaches an agreement with the Ottoman Sultan Mehmed I to begin discussing a treaty.
- August 15
  - Sigismund, King of Germany, and King Henry V of England conclude the Treaty of Canterbury, an alliance of the two nations against France.
  - Harfleur relieved, following a naval battle in the estuary of the Seine.
- September 3 – King Henry V summons the English Parliament for the third time in less than a year, directing the MPs to assemble on October 19.

=== October–December ===
- October 19 – The English Parliament is opened by King Henry V. The House of Commons elects Roger Flower as its Speaker.
- November 8 – Admiral Pietro Loredan is hailed as a hero upon his return to Venice after the Battle of Gallipoli.
- November 14 – China's Emperor Cheng Zu and his fleet return to Nanjing from his fourth expedition for treasure after having been away since 1413.
- November 19 – At Nanjing, China's Emperor Cheng Zu bestows gifts at a grand ceremony to princes, civil officials, military officers, and the ambassadors of 18 countries.
- December 16 (26 Shawwal 819 AH) – Hasan ibn Ajlan, the Vice Sultan of the Hejaz, becomes the Emir of Mecca again upon the surrender of Rumaythah ibn Muhammad, who usurped the Emirate in February.
- December 2 – Through the Council of Constance and diplomatic treaties during late 1416, Sigismund, King of Germany unifies the fractured Catholic Church and isolates the Bohemian reformers, providing him with the necessary authority to later initiate the Hussite Wars against Jan Žižka.
- December 28 – China's Emperor Cheng Zu announces a fifth treasure voyage.
- December 30 (10 Dhu al-Qadah 819 AH) – Hamsa Bhat, the Vizier for Ali Shah, the Sultan of Kashmir, is assassinated and Zayn al-Abidin is appointed to replace him.

=== Date unknown ===
- The Trezzo sull'Adda Bridge (the longest arch bridge in the world at this time) is destroyed.
- The Hussite Bible is completed by Tamás Pécsi and Bálint Újlaki.

== Births ==
- February 26 – Christopher of Bavaria (d. 1448)
- March 27 – Antonio Squarcialupi, Italian organist and composer (d. 1480)
- March 28 – Jodha of Mandore, Ruler of Marwar (d. 1489)
- May 25 – Jakobus, nobleman from Lichtenberg in the northern part of Alsace (d. 1480)
- October 26 – Edmund Grey, 1st Earl of Kent (d. 1490)
- date unknown
  - Benedetto Cotrugli, Ragusan/Croatian merchant, economist, scientist, diplomat and humanist (d. 1469)
  - Pal Engjëlli, Albanian Catholic clergyman (d. 1470)
  - Francis of Paola, founder of the Order of the Minims (d. 1507)
  - Piero di Cosimo de' Medici, ruler of Florence (d. 1469)
- probable – Jacquetta of Luxembourg, English duchess and countess (d. 1472)

== Deaths ==
- February 2 – Racek Kobyla of Dvorce, Bohemian Hetman and Burgrave.
- February 27 – Eleanor of Castile, queen consort of Navarre (b. c. 1363)
- April 2 – King Ferdinand I of Aragon (b. 1379)
- May 21 – Anna of Celje, queen consort of Poland (b. c. 1381)
- May 30 – Jerome of Prague, Czech theologian (executed) (b. 1379)
- June 15 – John, Duke of Berry, son of John II of France (b. 1340)
- September 4 – John I, Count of Nassau-Siegen, German count
- October 1 – Yaqub Spata, lord of Arta
- October 14 – Henry the Mild, Duke of Brunswick-Lüneburg
- December 29 – Mathew Swetenham, bowbearer of Henry IV
- date unknown – The Limbourg brothers, painters of the Très Riches Heures du Duc de Berry.
- probable
  - Owain Glyndŵr, Welsh prince and leader of the Welsh Revolt
  - Julian of Norwich, English anchoress, mystic and author
