= 1391 =

1391 in various calendars
- Gregorian calendar: 1391; MCCCXCI
- Ab urbe condita: 2144
- Armenian calendar: 840; ԹՎ ՊԽ
- Assyrian calendar: 6141
- Balinese saka calendar: 1312–1313
- Bengali calendar: 797–798
- Berber calendar: 2341
- English Regnal year: 14 Ric. 2 – 15 Ric. 2
- Buddhist calendar: 1935
- Burmese calendar: 753
- Byzantine calendar: 6899–6900
- Chinese calendar: 庚午年 (Metal Horse); 4088 or 3881 — to — 辛未年 (Metal Goat); 4089 or 3882
- Coptic calendar: 1107–1108
- Discordian calendar: 2557
- Ethiopian calendar: 1383–1384
- Hebrew calendar: 5151–5152
- Hindu calendars
- Vikram Samvat: 1447–1448
- Shaka Samvat: 1312–1313
- Kali Yuga: 4491–4492
- Holocene calendar: 11391
- Igbo calendar: 391–392
- Iranian calendar: 769–770
- Islamic calendar: 793–794
- Japanese calendar: Meitoku 2 (明徳２年)
- Javanese calendar: 1304–1305
- Julian calendar: 1391; MCCCXCI
- Korean calendar: 3724
- Minguo calendar: 521 before ROC 民前521年
- Nanakshahi calendar: −77
- Thai solar calendar: 1933–1934
- Tibetan calendar: ལྕགས་ཕོ་རྟ་ལོ་ (male Iron-Horse); 1517 or 1136 or 364 — to — ལྕགས་མོ་ལུག་ལོ་ (female Iron-Sheep); 1518 or 1137 or 365

June 6: Massacre of Jews in Spain begins in Seville

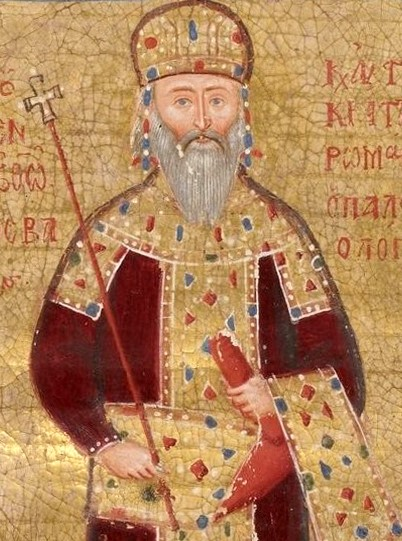
Manuel II Palaiologos becomes the new Emperor of Byzantium

Year 1391 (MCCCXCI) was a common year starting on Sunday of the Julian calendar.

== Events ==
=== January–March ===
- January 16 – Yusuf II succeeds Muhammad V, as Nasrid Sultan of Granada (now southern Spain).
- January 21 – Vytautas the Great, claimant to the throne of Lithuania, forges an alliance with the Grand Duchy of Moscow as his daughter, Sophia marries Vasily, Grand Prince of Muscovy.
- February 16 –Manuel II Palaiologos becomes Byzantine emperor after his father, John V Palaiologos, dies from a nervous breakdown, due to his continued humiliation by the Ottoman Empire.
- March 4– The University of Ferrara is founded on the Italian Peninsula.
- March 10 – Stephen Dabiša succeeds Stephen Tvrtko I, as King of Bosnia.
- March 12 – Konrad von Wallenrode succeeds Konrad Zöllner von Rotenstein, as Grand Master of the Teutonic Knights.

=== April–June ===
- April 1 – Rebelling against the rule of King Martin of Sicily, the rebel Brancaleone Doria begins the takeover of the island of Sardinia by laying siege to the Castel di Cagliari.
- April 6 – Antoniotto Adorno returns to office as Doge of the Republic of Genoa after persuading Doge Giacomo Fregoso (who had replaced him eight months earlier) to resign.
- May 27 – Dominique de Flourence, Bishop of Saint-Pons-de-Thomières, helps conclude a peace agreement between the Kingdom of France and the Crown of Castile, based on his influence as France's legate to King Juan I of Castile.
- June 6 – Massacre of 1391: Anti-Jewish pogroms erupt in Seville, Spain. Many thousands of Jews are massacred, and the violence spreads throughout Spain and Portugal, especially to Toledo, Barcelona and Mallorca. This event marks a turning-point in the history of the Spanish Jews, with most of the survivors leaving the Iberian Peninsula or being forced to convert.

=== July–September ===
- July 18 – Tokhtamysh–Timur war – Battle of the Kondurcha River: Timur defeats Tokhtamysh of the Golden Horde, in present day southeast Russia.
- August 16 – Brancaleone Doria takes control of Sassari and Osilo as he gains further power in Sardinia.
- September 7 – King Richard II summons the English Parliament and directs the members to assemble at Winchester on November 3.

=== October–December ===
- October 3 – Brancaleone Doria captures Villa di Chiesa in Sardinia.
- October 7 – Bridget of Sweden is canonized by Pope Boniface IX.
- November 2 – At Chambéry (now in France), Amadeus the Peaceful becomes the new Count of Savoy at the age of 8 upon the death from tetanus of his 31-year-old father, Amadeus VII, the Red Count, who was injured in a hunting accident. Bonne of Bourbon, the mother of the older Amadeus, serves as regent for her grandson until 1397.
- November 2 – Al-Nasir Muhammad Salah al-Din, Imam of the Zaydi sect of Shia Islam in Yemen, dies at Sanaa from injuries sustained from being thrown off of his mule. Nasir's death is not announced for two months while his son Al-Mansur Ali bin Salah ad-Din becomes the new Imam but three other claimants attempt to claim the office as well.
- November 3 – King Richard II opens the new session of Parliament at Westminster.
- December 3 – The Parliament ends its session after passing numerous acts, and King Richard gives royal assent to multiple acts, including the Forcible Entry Act 1391 and the Admiralty Jurisdiction Act 1391.
- December 29 – Representatives of Prince Amadeo of Savoy meet with Nerio I Acciaioli, Duke of Athens at the Acropolis in a pact against the Navarrese Company. The parties agree to oppose the Navarrese control of Morea and Nerio agrees to recognize Amadeo as Prince of Achaea.
- December 25 – Jean II Le Maingre is named as the Marshal of France by King Charles V in a ceremony at the cathedral of St. Martin at Tours.
- December – At Suceava, Roman I succeeds Petru Mușat, as Prince of Moldavia (now Moldova and northeastern Romania).

=== Date unknown ===
- Shah Mansur becomes leader of the Timurid-occupied Muzaffarid Empire, in central Persia.
- A group of Muzaffarids under Zafar Khan Muzaffar establish a new Sultanate at Gujarat, in western India.
- Ushkuinik pirates from Novgorod sack the Muscovy towns of Zhukotin and Kazan.
- Henry I Sinclair, Earl of Orkney, takes control of the Shetland Islands and the Faroe Islands.

== Births ==
- June 24 – Joan of France, Duchess of Brittany (d. 1433)
- July 31 – Cyriacus of Ancona, Italian merchant, "father of archaeology" (d. 1453/5)
- October 31 – Edward, King of Portugal (d. 1438)
- November 6 – Edmund Mortimer, 5th Earl of March, English politician (d. 1425)
- Gedun Drub, 1st Dalai Lama (d. 1474)
- Thomas West, 2nd Baron West, English soldier (d. 1415)

== Deaths ==
- January 16 – Emir Muhammad V of Granada (b. 1338)
- February 16 – John V Palaiologos, Byzantine emperor (b. 1332)
- March 10 – King Tvrtko I of Bosnia (b. 1338)
- August 1 - Gaston III of Foix, co-prince of Andorra
- November 1 – Amadeus VII, Count of Savoy (b. 1360)
- date unknown
  - Petru II, Prince of Moldavia
  - Margaret, Countess of Mar (approximate date)
