= 1408 =

1408 in various calendars
- Gregorian calendar: 1408; MCDVIII
- Ab urbe condita: 2161
- Armenian calendar: 857; ԹՎ ՊԾԷ
- Assyrian calendar: 6158
- Balinese saka calendar: 1329–1330
- Bengali calendar: 814–815
- Berber calendar: 2358
- English Regnal year: 9 Hen. 4 – 10 Hen. 4
- Buddhist calendar: 1952
- Burmese calendar: 770
- Byzantine calendar: 6916–6917
- Chinese calendar: 丁亥年 (Fire Pig); 4105 or 3898 — to — 戊子年 (Earth Rat); 4106 or 3899
- Coptic calendar: 1124–1125
- Discordian calendar: 2574
- Ethiopian calendar: 1400–1401
- Hebrew calendar: 5168–5169
- Hindu calendars
- Vikram Samvat: 1464–1465
- Shaka Samvat: 1329–1330
- Kali Yuga: 4508–4509
- Holocene calendar: 11408
- Igbo calendar: 408–409
- Iranian calendar: 786–787
- Islamic calendar: 810–811
- Japanese calendar: Ōei 15 (応永１５年)
- Javanese calendar: 1322–1323
- Julian calendar: 1408; MCDVIII
- Korean calendar: 3741
- Minguo calendar: 504 before ROC 民前504年
- Nanakshahi calendar: −60
- Thai solar calendar: 1950–1951
- Tibetan calendar: མེ་མོ་ཕག་ལོ་ (female Fire-Boar); 1534 or 1153 or 381 — to — ས་ཕོ་བྱི་བ་ལོ་ (male Earth-Rat); 1535 or 1154 or 382

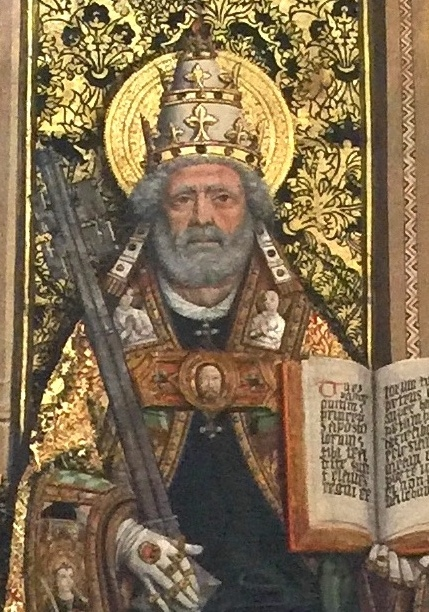
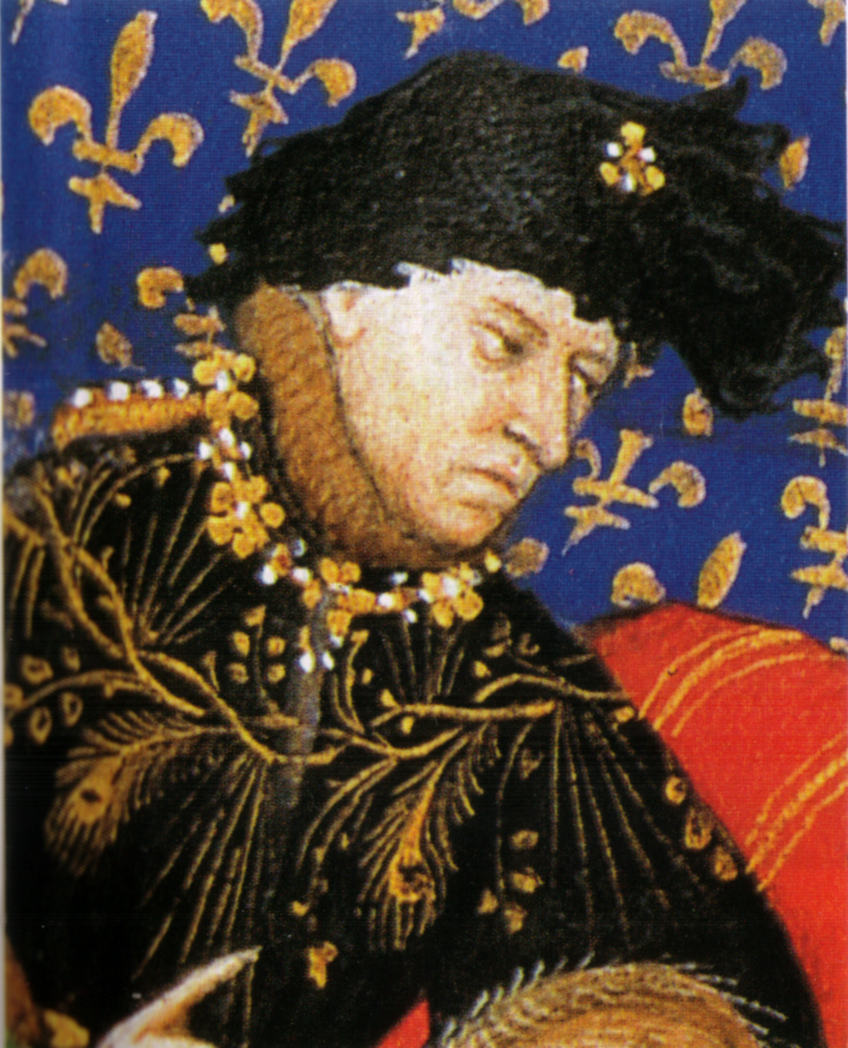
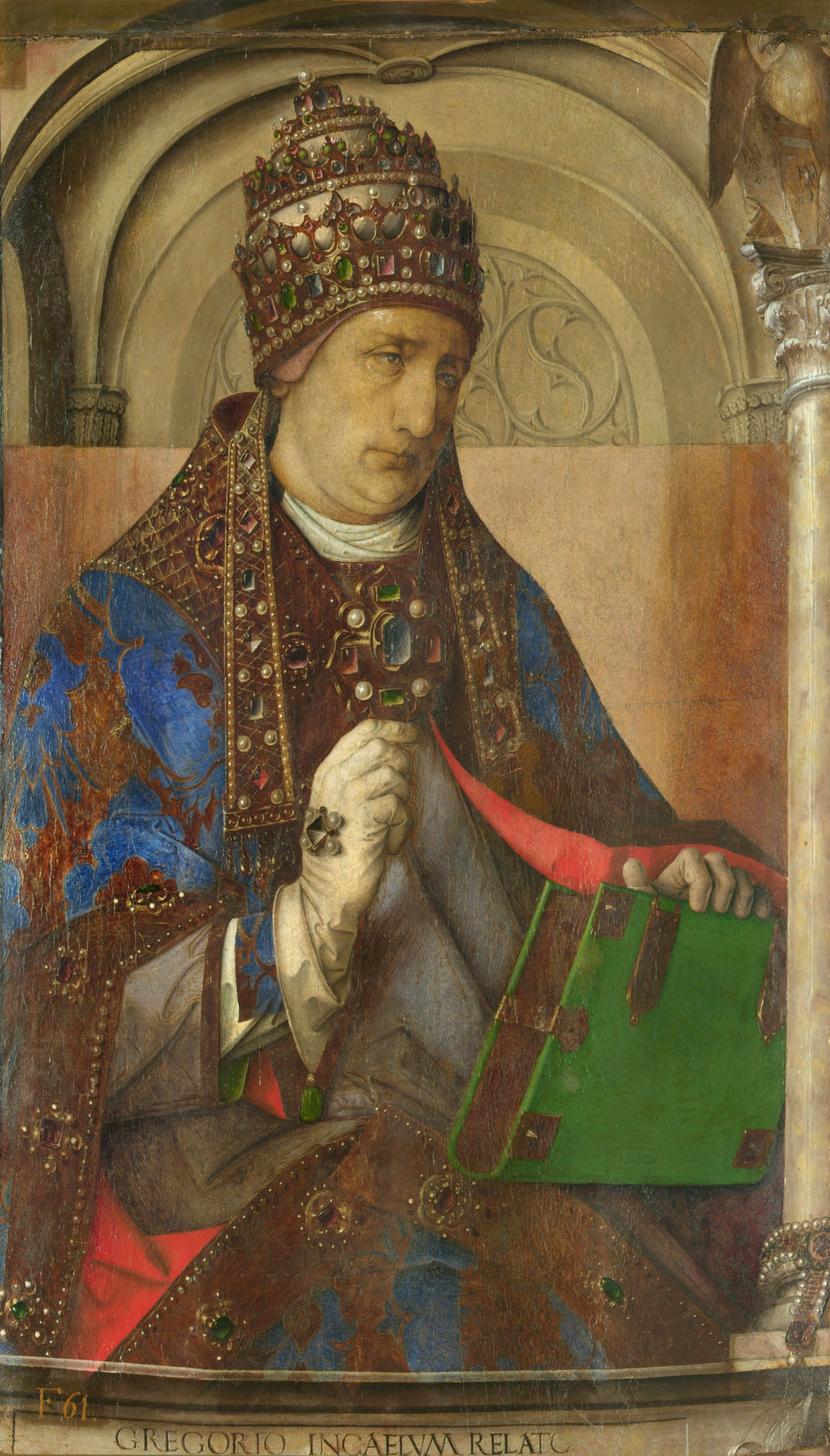
May 18: Antipope Benedict XIII threatens France's King Charles VI, who turns his support to Pope Gregory XII

Year 1408 (MCDVIII) was a leap year starting on Sunday of the Julian calendar.

== Events ==
=== January–March ===
- January 12 – Western Schism: King Charles VI of France sends a letter to the Antipope Benedict XIII at Avignon, giving an ultimatum to Benedict and the other Avignon Papacy proponents to end the schism in the Roman Catholic Church against the Roman Obedience, headed by Pope Gregory XII. King Charles VI threatens that unless the schism ends by Ascension Day, 40 days after Easter (in 1408, April 24, with Ascension Day on June 3), France will end its support of the Avignon Obedience.
- January 13 – Appenzell Wars: In the Appenzell region of Switzerland, the alliance of the region with St. Gallen, the Bund ob dem See "alliance over the lake", referring to the nearby Lake Constance fails in its attempt to liberate the city of Bregenz from Austrian rule. The Bund is dissolved less than three months later.
- February 19 – Battle of Bramham Moor: A royalist army defeats the last remnants of the Percy Rebellion.
- March 14 – John of Bourbon, son of Louis II, Duke of Bourbon, is appointed as the Grand Chamberlain of France by King Charles VI.
- March – (late in the month of Tagu, which ended March 28, 769 ME) Ava–Hanthawaddy War: In Burma (now Myanmar), King Razdarit leads the invasion of the Kingdom of North Arakan and overthrows its ruler, Anawrahta of Launggyet, then has him executed.

=== April–June ===
- April 8 – Appenzell Wars: In the Appenzell region of Switzerland, the alliance of the region with St. Gallen, the ("alliance over the lake", referring to the nearby Lake Constance fails in its attempt to liberate the city of Bregenz from Austrian rule. From the Holy Roman Empire, King Rupert of Germany orders the dissolution of the Bund ob dem See.
- May 18 – Western Schism: In response to the January 12 ultimatum by France, the antipope Benedict publishes a bull directing the excommunication of anyone, including King Charles VI, who attempted to withdraw obedience to the Avignon Papacy. The bull, "a major tactical mistake" by Benedict, gives the leaders of the University of Paris a pretext to declare those who had carried the bull to be guilty of high treason, and to accuse Benedict to be guilty of an attack on the royal dignity and national honor. King Charles then withdraws further support of Pope Benedict and proclaims the neutrality of France in the schism between Avignon and Rome.
- May 28 – A representative of Burma's Kingdom of Ava apologizes to the Ming dynasty Emperor of China for the kingdom's occupation of China's vassals, the Shan States, particularly the Mongyang State, whose monarch was killed in 1406.
- June 15 – After receiving the news that France will no longer support his Avignon Obedience, the Antipope Benedict XIII issues the Bull Celestis altitudo, summoning the a council to meet on November 1 at the French city of Perpignan, and then flees from the French-controlled Italian region of Genoa to avoid arrest.

=== July–December ===
- July 2 – From Livorno, a group of 13 Roman Catholic Cardinals allied with Pope Gregory begins sending encyclical letters "to the princes and prelates of the Christian world" summoning them to the Council of Pisa, to take place on March 25, 1409, in order to end the Western Schism.
- August 20 – Abdul Majid Hassan, the Sultan of Brunei, sets off on a voyage to China at the invitation of the Emperor Cheng Zu and arrives in the capital, Nanjing, by September, becoming the first foreign monarch to make a peaceful visit to the Chinese Empire. While visiting, the Sultan becomes ill and dies on October 19.
- September 16 – Thorstein Olafssøn marries Sigrid Bjørnsdatter in Hvalsey Church, in the last recorded event of the Norse history of Greenland.
- September 22 – Andronikos Palaiologos becomes the new Byzantine Emperor of Thessalonica after the death of his brother, John VIII Palaiologos.
- September 23
  - Henry, Prince of Wales (later Henry V of England) retakes Aberystwyth from Owain Glyndŵr.
  - The Battle of Othée is fought between the citizens of Liège and a professional army under command of John the Fearless. The militia of Liège suffers a heavy defeat.
- October 19 – Awang Pateh Berbai, in Nanjing in China as part of the family accompanying his nephew, the Sultan Abdul Majid Hassan, becomes the new Sultan of Brunei when Abdul dies from an illness.
- November 15 – The Antipope Benedict XIII convenes the Council of Perpignan.
- December – Lithuanian Grand Duke Vytautas meet with Polish King Wladyslaw Jagiello in Navahrudak Castle, where they agree to support the Samogitians uprising to provoke the Teutonic Knights into declaring war against Poland.
- December 5 – Emir Edigu of the Golden Horde reaches Moscow.
- December 13 – The Order of the Dragon is founded under King Sigismund of Hungary.

=== Date unknown ===
- The Moldavian town of Iaşi is first mentioned.
- The Yongle Encyclopedia is completed.
- Gotland passes under Danish rule.
- Zheng He delivers 300 virgins from Korea to the Chinese Emperor Cheng Zu.
- Mihail I becomes co-ruler of Wallachia, with his father Mircea cel Bătrân.

== Births ==
- January 25 – Katharina of Hanau, German countess regent (d. 1460)
- February 14 – John FitzAlan, 14th Earl of Arundel (d. 1435)
- March 25 – Agnes of Baden, Countess of Holstein-Rendsburg, German noble (d. 1473)
- April 8 – Jadwiga of Lithuania, Polish princess (d. 1431)
- April 23 – John de Vere, 12th Earl of Oxford, English noble (d. 1462)
- May 22 – Annamacharya, Indian mystic saint composer (d. 1503)
- October 1 or 1409 – Karl Knutsson, King of Sweden (d. 1470)

== Deaths ==
- January 13 – Coptic Pope Matthew I of Alexandria
- February 19 – Thomas Bardolf, 5th Baron Bardolf, English rebel (in battle)
- February 20 – Henry Percy, 1st Earl of Northumberland, English rebel (in battle) (b. 1341)
- April – Miran Shah, son of Timur the Lame (b. 1366)
- April 10 or April 11 – Elizabeth le Despenser, English noblewoman
- May 24 – Taejo of Joseon, ruler of Korea (b. 1335)
- May 31 – Ashikaga Yoshimitsu, Japanese shōgun (b. 1358)
- September 15 – Edmund Holland, 4th Earl of Kent (b. 1384)
- September 22 – John VII Palaiologos, Byzantine Emperor (b. 1370)
- December 4 – Valentina Visconti, Duchess of Orléans by marriage to Louis I, Duke of Orléans
