= 1409 =

1409 in various calendars
- Gregorian calendar: 1409; MCDIX
- Ab urbe condita: 2162
- Armenian calendar: 858; ԹՎ ՊԾԸ
- Assyrian calendar: 6159
- Balinese saka calendar: 1330–1331
- Bengali calendar: 815–816
- Berber calendar: 2359
- English Regnal year: 10 Hen. 4 – 11 Hen. 4
- Buddhist calendar: 1953
- Burmese calendar: 771
- Byzantine calendar: 6917–6918
- Chinese calendar: 戊子年 (Earth Rat); 4106 or 3899 — to — 己丑年 (Earth Ox); 4107 or 3900
- Coptic calendar: 1125–1126
- Discordian calendar: 2575
- Ethiopian calendar: 1401–1402
- Hebrew calendar: 5169–5170
- Hindu calendars
- Vikram Samvat: 1465–1466
- Shaka Samvat: 1330–1331
- Kali Yuga: 4509–4510
- Holocene calendar: 11409
- Igbo calendar: 409–410
- Iranian calendar: 787–788
- Islamic calendar: 811–812
- Japanese calendar: Ōei 16 (応永１６年)
- Javanese calendar: 1323–1324
- Julian calendar: 1409; MCDIX
- Korean calendar: 3742
- Minguo calendar: 503 before ROC 民前503年
- Nanakshahi calendar: −59
- Thai solar calendar: 1951–1952
- Tibetan calendar: ས་ཕོ་བྱི་བ་ལོ་ (male Earth-Rat); 1535 or 1154 or 382 — to — ས་མོ་གླང་ལོ་ (female Earth-Ox); 1536 or 1155 or 383

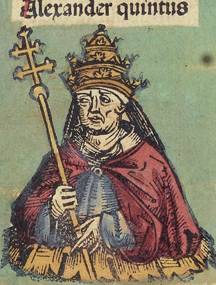
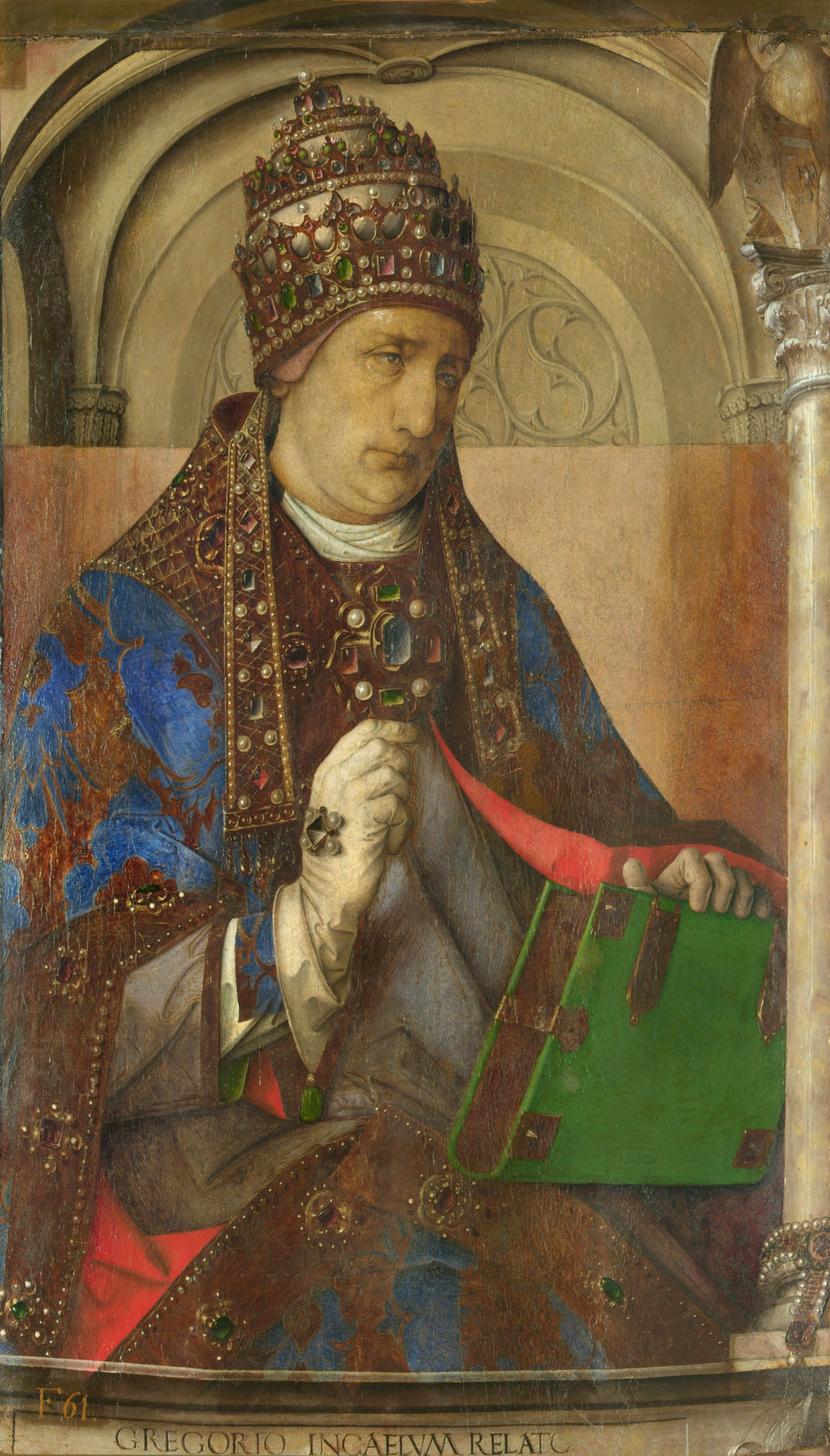
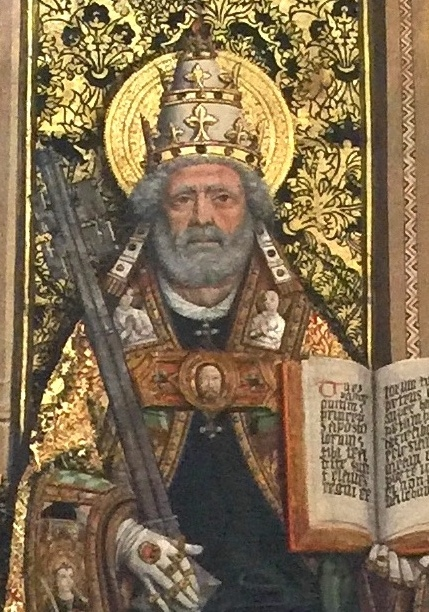
June 26: Council of Pisa crowns a third Pope, Alexander V, to rival Pope Gregory XIII and Rome's Pope Benedict XIII and Avignon's Pope Benedict XIII

Year 1409 (MCDIX) was a common year starting on Tuesday of the Julian calendar.

== Events ==
=== January–March ===
- January 1 – The Welsh surrender Harlech Castle to the English.
- January 18 – The Decree of Kutná Hora strengthens the Bohemian nation at the cost of foreign, mostly German speaking students at the University of Prague. Over a thousand students leave Prague as a consequence, choosing instead the universities of Heidelberg and the new University of Leipzig established later in the year.
- February 15 – The Galle Trilingual Inscription, with inscriptions in three languages (Chinese, Tamil and Persian) is installed by the Chinese admiral Zheng He at Galle in Sri Lanka, where he has stopped while on his way home during the second of his treasure voyages.
- February 24 – Traveling in Valencia in Aragon, Father Joan Gilabert Jofré, known as "Padre Jofré", witnesses a mentally ill man being beaten by two young attackers. After rescuing the victim, Jofré resolves to create the Hospital dels Ignoscents, the world's first psychiatric hospital.
- March 25 – On the day of the Feast of the Annunciation, the Council of Pisa opens at the Cathedral of Pisa with 22 cardinals, four patriarchs and 80 bishops to seek an end to the Western Schism and resolve the conflict between Pope Gregory XII of the Rome and Antipope Benedict XIII of Avignon.

=== April–June ===
- April 25 – Hussite Wars: King Wenceslaus IV of Bohemia decides to stop fighting the war against the rebel Jan Žižka in Budějovice.
- May 10 – The Council of Pisa votes on the matter of whether to remove the warring popes Gregory XII and Benedict XIII. All but two of the clerics present vote for them to be deposed, with the exception of Cardinal Gui de Maillesec and Cardinal Niccolò Brancaccio, who ask for more time to consider.
- May 13 – The Timurid War of Succession comes to an end as Khalil Sultan surrenders Samarkand to Shah Rukh, ruler of the Timurid Empire since 1405. Shah Rukh installs his son Ulugh Beg as Governor of Transoxiana. Shah Rukh then appoints Khalil as Governor of Shahr-e Rey in modern-day Iran.
- May 18 – The Timurid prince Pir Muhammad is assassinated by his own soldiers.
- May 26 – The second Samogitian Uprising begins in modern-day Lithuania against the Teutonic Knights who had been granted the rights to the Duchy of Samogita by the Peace of Raciążek in 1402.
- June 5 – The Council of Pisa issues the order deposing both Gregory XII and Benedict XIII who are responsible for the Western Schism.
- June 26 – By order of the Council of Pisa, Pietro Filargo is crowned as Pope Alexander V, producing the anomaly of three different popes of the Roman Catholic church.
- June 27 – Bohemia's King Wenceslaus pardons rebel leader Jan Zizka, and orders the city of Budejovice to do so as well.

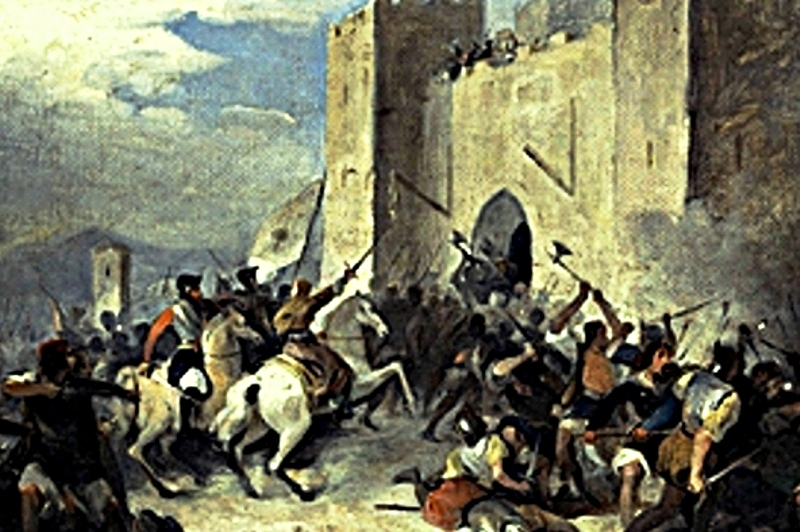
The Battle of Sanluri

- June 30 – The Battle of Sanluri is fought at Sardinia between the Kingdom of Sicily and the Judicate of Arborea.

=== July–September ===
- July 9 – The Republic of Venice, led by the Doge Michele Steno, gains control of both sides of the Adriatic Sea by purchasing the Dalmatian coast (bordered in modern times by Slovenia and Croatia) from King Ladislaus the Magnanimous, ruler of the Kingdom of Naples for 100,000 ducats, or 350 kilograms of gold.
- July 25 – Martin I, King of Aragon, becomes King Martin II of Sicily upon the death of his son, Martin I of Sicily.
- August 6 – The Polish–Lithuanian–Teutonic War breaks out between the Teutonic Knights and the allied Kingdom of Poland and Grand Duchy of Lithuania.
- August 7 – The Council of Pisa closes.
- September 9 – The new Pope Alexander V issues a papal bull granting a charter to the University of Leipzig.

=== October–December ===
- October 7 – Jean de Montagu, Grand Master of France and a leading advisor to the mentally unstable King Charles VI of France, is arrested on orders of John the Fearless, Duke of Burgundy. Montagu is publicly beheaded 10 days later at the Gibbet of Montfaucon in Paris.
- October 26 –
  - Representatives of the Venetian Republic (in modern-day Italy) and the Principality of Zeta (part of modern-day Serbia) sign a peace treaty to halt the First Scutari War for one year.
  - King Henry IV of England summons the English Parliament to assemble, starting on January 27.
- November 23 – King Henry IV of England sends a letter to all leading nobles, including a warning to them to have no further communication or entreaty with the Welsh rebel Owain Glyndŵr.
- December 2 – The University of Leipzig opens.
- December 9 – Louis II of Anjou founds the University of Aix-en-Provence.

=== Date unknown ===
- Ulugh Beg becomes governor of Samarkand.
- The Republic of Venice purchases the port of Zadar from Hungary.
- Grand Master Ulrich von Jungingen of the Teutonic Knights guarantees peace with the Kalmar Union of Scandinavia by selling the Baltic Sea island of Gotland to Queen Margaret of Denmark, Norway and Sweden.
- Cheng Ho (or Zheng He), admiral of the Ming empire fleet, deposes the king of Sri Lanka.
- Mircea cel Bătrân of Wallachia successfully defends Silistra against the Ottomans

== Births ==
- January 16 – René of Anjou, king of Naples (d. 1480)
- March 2 – John II, Duke of Alençon, son of John I of Alençon and Marie of Brittany (d. 1476)
- March 12 – Isabella of Urgell, Duchess of Coimbra, Portuguese Duchess (d. 1459)
- September 13 – Joan of Valois, Duchess of Alençon, French duchess (d. 1432)
- October 1 – Karl Knutsson Bonde, King of Sweden (d. 1470)
- October 7 – Elizabeth of Luxembourg (d. 1442)
- October 21 – Alessandro Sforza, Italian condottiero (d. 1473)
- date unknown – Bernardo Rossellino, Florentine sculptor and architect

== Deaths ==
- May 13 – Jan of Tarnów, Polish nobleman
- May 22 – Blanche of England, sister of King Henry V (b. 1392)
- July 25 – King Martin I of Sicily (b. 1374)
- September 13 – Isabella of Valois, French princess and queen of England (b. 1387)
- date unknown – Thomas Merke, English bishop
- probable – Edmund Mortimer, English rebel (b. 1376)
