= 1520s =

Decade

The 1520s decade ran from January 1, 1520, to December 31, 1529.

== Events ==
=== 1520 ===
==== January–March ====
- January 19 – King Christian II of Denmark and Norway defeats the Swedes, at Lake Åsunden in Sweden. The Swedish regent Sten Sture the Younger is mortally wounded in the Battle of Bogesund. He is rushed towards Stockholm, in order to lead the fight against the Danes from there.
- February 3 – Swedish regent Sten Sture dies from his wounds leaving a vacancy on the throne that allows King Christian II of Denmark to conquer Sweden within eight months.
- February 6 – The Swabian League sells the Duchy of Württemberg to the Holy Roman Emperor, Charles V, for 220,000 florins and payment of the Duchy's debt of 1,100,000 Goldgulden
- March 10 – Thomas Howard, 3rd Duke of Norfolk becomes England's new Lord Deputy of Ireland
- March 31 – The Magellan expedition, led by Portuguese explorer Ferdinand Magellan (Fernão de Magalhães), pauses in its attempt to sail aroundthe world, stopping at Puerto San Julian on the lower east coast of what is now Patagonia in Argentina. His fleet consists of Magellan's flagship, Trinidad, and four other vessels, Concepción, Victoria, San Antonio and Santiago.

==== April–June ====
- April 2 – Juan de Cartagena, formerly captain of the largest ship on the Magellan expedition, San Antonio, escapes captivity from the Victoria and begins a mutiny against Ferdinand Magellan. He is joined by Gaspar de Quesada, captain of the Concepción, and Luis de Mendoza, captain of the Victoria. On the first day of the rebellion, under the pretense of delivering Magellan's letter of surrender to the Victoria, several crew from the Magellan's flagship Trinidad stab Mendoza to death, and the rest of the Victoria crew seizes the mutineers.
- April 3 – The crew of the San Antonio surrenders to Magellan after being unable to stop drifting in strong winds and being fired at by a cannon, and Gaspar de Quesada surrenders the Concepcion. Four days later, Quesada is beheaded along with other mutineers, while Cartagena is left on an island by Magellan in August.
- April 16 – Revolt of the Comuneros: Citizens of Toledo, Castile opposed to the rule of the Flemish-born Charles V, Holy Roman Emperor, rise up when the royal government attempts to unseat radical city councilors.
- May 7 – The semi-independent Duchy of Mecklenburg, in what is now Germany, is partitioned into two duchies, Mecklenburg-Schwerin and Mecklenburg-Strelitz.
- May 22 –
  - The Massacre in the Great Temple of Tenochtitlan takes place in Mexico after the Aztec Emperor Moctezuma II is allowed by the Deputy Governor of New Spain, Pedro de Alvarado, to host Aztec nobles at the Great Temple at Tenochtitlan to celebrate the Feat of Toxcatl in honor of the god Tezcatlipoca. Alvarado uses the opportunity to kill more than 600 Aztec warriors and commanders, but spares Moctezuma.
  - The Magellan expedition loses its first ship as the caravel Santiago is wrecked in a storm while sailing inland on Argentina's Santa Cruz River
- June 7 – King Henry VIII of England and King Francis I of France meet at the famous Field of the Cloth of Gold.
- June 10 – Revolt of the Comuneros: Segovia is blockaded.
- June 15 – Pope Leo X issues the bull Exsurge Domine (Arise O Lord), threatening Martin Luther with excommunication, if he does not recant his position on indulgences and other Catholic doctrines.
- June 29 – Moctezuma II, Aztec ruler of Tenochtitlan, is assassinated by other Aztec leaders as he attempts to address his people. His brother Cuitláhuac rises to the throne.

==== July–September ====
- July 1 – La Noche Triste (Night of Sorrow): The forces of Cuitláhuac, Aztec ruler of Tenochtitlan, gain a major victory against the forces of conquistador Hernán Cortés. This results in the death of about 400 conquistadors, and some 2,000 of their Native American allies. However, Cortés and the most skilled of his men manage to escape and later regroup.
- July 7 – Otumba near Lake Texcaco: The Spaniards defeat the Aztecs.
- August 11 – Ferdinand Magellan maroons the two surviving people who had attempted a mutiny against him, Captain Juan de Cartagena and Father Pedro Sánchez de la Reina, placing them on an island off of the coast of Argentina and providing them with a small supply of ship's biscuits and drinking water. Cartagena and Sanchez are never heard from again.
- August 21 – After wintering in Patagonia in Argentina, the Magellan expedition resumes its attempt to become the first crew to sail around the world.
- August 24 – The French warrior René of Savoy departs from Marseille on his flagship, Sainte Marie de Bonaventure on a four-month mission to protect the Knights Hospitaller against an attack by the Ottoman Turks.
- August – Martin Luther publishes To the Christian Nobility of the German Nation.
- September 7 – Christian II makes his triumphant entry into Stockholm, which had surrendered to him a few days earlier. Sten Sture's widow Christina Gyllenstierna, who has led the fight after Sten's death, and all other persons in the resistance against the Danes, are granted amnesty and are pardoned for their involvement in the resistance.
- September 22 – Suleiman I succeeds his father Selim I as Sultan of the Ottoman Empire. He is officially crowned on September 30.

==== October–December ====
- October 21 (Feast of St. Ursula) – The islands of Saint Pierre and Miquelon are discovered by Portuguese explorer João Álvares Fagundes, off Newfoundland. He names them Islands of the 11,000 Virgins, in honour of Saint Ursula.
- October 23 – Charles V is crowned King of Germany in Aachen.
- October 21 – The four remaining ships of the Magellan expedition and their crews confirm that they have found the passage that will be named the Strait of Magellan, the passage between the Atlantic and Pacific Oceans. The crew of the San Antonio, led by Estêvão Gomes elects not to sail into strait and begins journeying back to Spain.
- November 1 – Christian II is crowned king of Sweden in Nikolai Church. The coronation is followed by a three-day feast in Stockholm.
- November 7 – At the end of the third day of Christian's coronation feast, several leading figures of the Swedish resistance against the Danish invasion are imprisoned, and tried for high treason.
- November 9– Stockholm Bloodbath: The execution of 82 Swedish noblemen and clergymen, having been sentenced to death for their involvement in the Swedish resistance against the Danish invasion, is completed after two days of beheading.
- November 25 – Cuauhtémoc becomes the last Aztec Emperor after the death from smallpox of the Emperor Cuitláhuac, who reigned for only 80 days.Orozco y Berra, Manuel (1880). Historia antigua y de la conquista de México (Ancient history of the conquest of Mexico). Tipografía de Gonzalo A. Esteva. p. 493.
- November 28 – After navigating through the strait at the southern end of South America, three ships under the command of Portuguese explorer Ferdinand Magellan reach the Pacific Ocean. Magellan thankful to find a peaceful sea after the dangerous trip through the strait, names the body of water "El Mar Pacifico" because of its pacifying waters. becoming the first Europeans to sail from the Atlantic Ocean to the Pacific (the strait is later named the Strait of Magellan).
- December 10 – Martin Luther burns a copy of The Book of Canon Law (see Canon Law), and his copy of the Papal bull Exsurge Domine.

==== Date unknown ====
- The Franciscan friar Matteo Bassi is inspired to return to the primitive life of solitude and penance, as practiced by St. Francis, giving rise to the Order of Friars Minor Capuchin.
- Duarte Barbosa returns to Cananor.
- Aleksandra Lisowska (Roxelana) is given as a gift to Suleiman I on the occasion of his accession to the throne.
- King Manuel I creates the public mail service of Portugal, the Correio Público.

=== 1521 ===
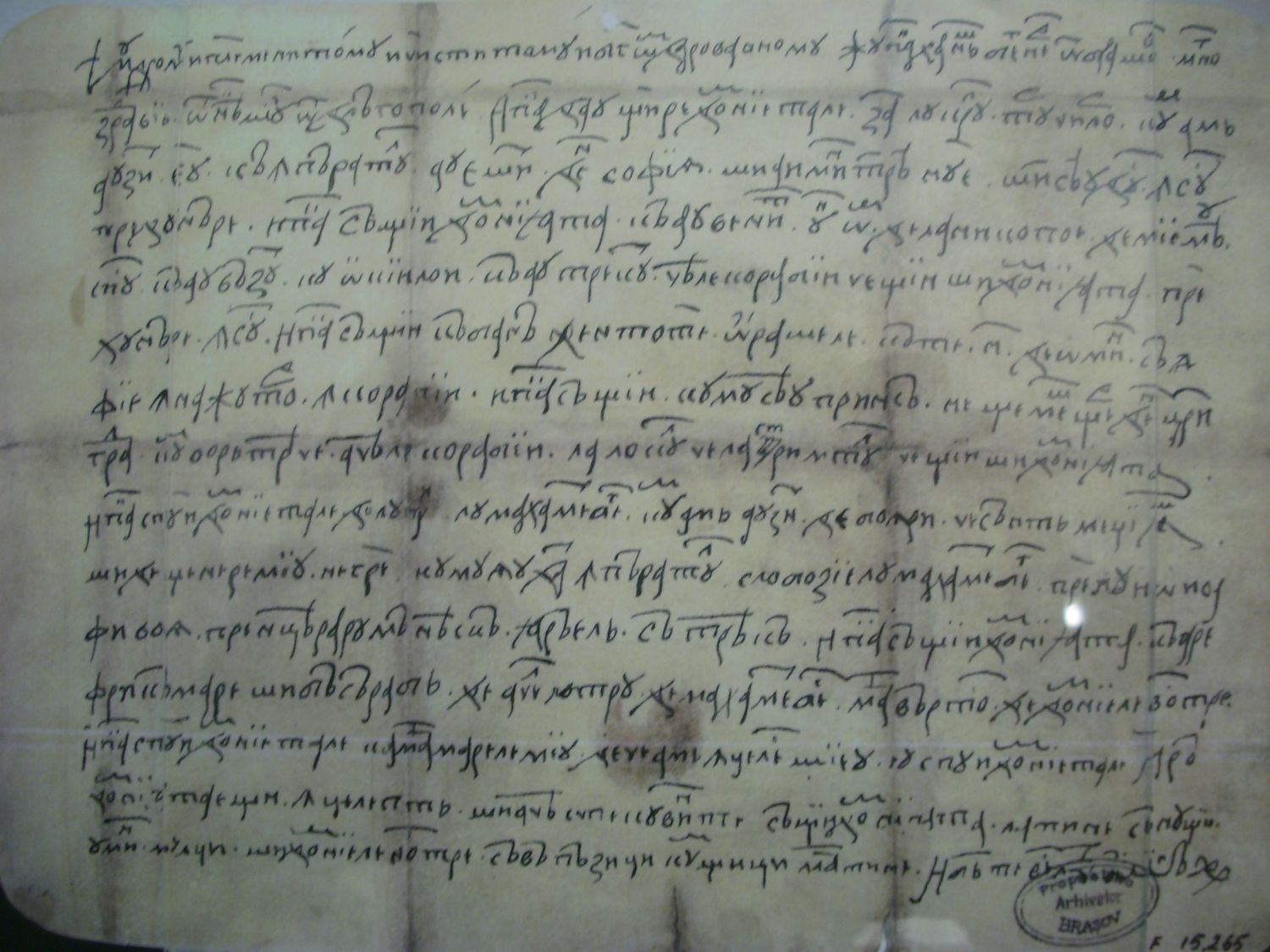
Neacșu's letter, the oldest surviving document written in Romanian has the oldest appearance of the word "Rumanian"

==== January–March ====
- January 3 – Pope Leo X excommunicates Martin Luther, in the papal bull Decet Romanum Pontificem.
- January 22 – Charles V, Holy Roman Emperor, opens the Diet of Worms in Worms, Germany.
- January 27 – Suleiman the Magnificent suppresses a revolt by the ruler of Damascus, Janbirdi al-Ghazali.
- February 2 – The Nydala Abbey Bloodbath takes place at Nydala Abbey, Sweden; the abbot and many monks are murdered by Danes.
- March 6
  - Ferdinand Magellan makes the first European contact with Guam, most likely landing in Tumon.
  - Martin Luther is summoned to appear before the Diet of Worms.
- March 16 – Ferdinand Magellan reaches the Philippines, in eastern Samar.
- March 31 – The First Mass in the Philippines is held.

==== April–June ====
- April 7
  - Ferdinand Magellan arrives at Cebu.
  - Martin Luther preaches an inflammatory sermon to students at Erfurt, while on his way to Worms.
- April 16–18 – Martin Luther is examined before Emperor Charles V and the Diet of Worms, where he refuses to recant his writings and allegedly proclaims, "Here I stand", regarding his belief in the Bible alone, as the standard of Christian doctrine.
- April 23 – Revolt of the Comuneros – Battle of Villalar: Castilian royalists defeat the rebels. Juan López de Padilla, Francisco Maldonado, and Juan Bravo are executed the following day as the leaders of the rebels.
- April 26 – Martin Luther leaves Worms and disappears for around a year – he is rumored to be murdered, but is actually in hiding at the Wartburg castle.
- April 27 – Battle of Mactan: Ferdinand Magellan is killed in the Philippines when he confronts Lapulapu, the chief of the island.
- April or May – Battle of Tunmen in Tuen Mun (present-day Hong Kong): The Ming Dynasty navy defeats the Portuguese navy (arguably the first Sino-European battle in world history).
- May 17 – Edward Stafford, 3rd Duke of Buckingham, is executed for treason in Tower Hill.
- May 20 – At the Battle of Pampeluna in Italy, and alliance of forces from French and the Kingdom of Navarre forces defeat those of Spain.
- May 25 – The Diet of Worms ends when Charles V, Holy Roman Emperor issues the Edict of Worms, declaring Martin Luther an outlaw and banning his literature.
- May 27 – After death of his cousin, Jiajing, Prince Zhu Houcong became the new Ming dynasty Emperor of China, taking the imperial name of the Emperor Jiajing becomes the new.
- June 25 – Suleiman the Magnificent begins the siege of Belgrade.
- June 29 or 30 – The oldest surviving dateable document written primarily in the Romanian language: Neacșu's letter, written by a trader from Câmpulung, to Johannes Benkner, the mayor of Brașov, warning that the Ottoman Empire is preparing its troops to cross into Wallachia and Transylvania; the script used is Romanian Cyrillic.
- June 30 – Battle of Esquiroz: French forces under André de Foix, fighting for the exiled King of Navarre Henri d'Albret, are defeated by the Spanish, and forced to abandon their attempt to recover Henri's kingdom.

==== July–September ====
- July 15 — San Juan Bautista is founded as the new capital of the archipelago of Puerto Rico.
- August 13 – Fall of Tenochtitlan: Cuauhtémoc surrenders to Cortés, thus incorporating the Aztec Empire into the Spanish Empire and ending the Late Postclassic period in Mesoamerica.
- August 20 – The Italian War of 1521–1526 breaks out between Charles V, Holy Roman Emperor, and Francis I of France as Henry III of Nassau-Breda leads Imperial troops on an invasion of northeastern France.
- August 29 – Belgrade is captured by the Ottoman army of Suleiman the Magnificent.

==== October–December ====
- October 25 – The Revolt of the Comuneros, an uprising by citizens of the Kingdom of Castile against the rule of Spain's King Carlos I, ends as the comuneros surrender Toledo.
- November 23 – Spanish–German–Papal forces under Prospero Colonna force French Marshal Odet de Lautrec to abandon Milan.
- December 27 – The Zwickau prophets arrive in Wittenberg, disturbing the peace and spreading the idea of rejecting infant baptism.

==== Date unknown ====
- Jacopo Berengario da Carpi publishes Commentaria cum amplissimus additionibus super anatomiam Mundini in Bologna, including observation of the vermiform appendix.
- The Grand Duchy of Ryazan is annexed by the Grand Duchy of Moscow.

=== 1522 ===
==== January–March ====
- January 9 – The papal conclave to elect a successor to the late Pope Leo X is concluded as Adriaan Florensz Boeyens of the Netherlands, Bishop of Utrecht, is selected as a compromise candidate despite being absent from the proceedings. Bishop Boeyens is proclaimed as Pope Adrian VI, the 218th pope and the last non-Italian pontiff for the next 450 years.
- January 26 – Spanish conquistador Gil González Dávila sets out from the gulf of Panama to explore the Pacific coast of Central America. He explores Nicaragua and names Costa Rica when he finds copious quantities of gold in Pacific beaches.
- February 5 – In Castile in Spain, the Revolt of the Comuneros is re-ignited when King Carlos V reneges on a promised amnesty to participants in a 1520 uprising, and threatens to execute revolt leader María Pacheco. Calm is restored by the intervention of Maria de Mendoza, and while many of the rebels are punished, Pacheco is able to escape to Portugal.
- February 7 – The Pact of Brussels is signed between Charles V, Holy Roman Emperor and his younger brother Archduke Ferdinand, guaranteeing Charles's support of Ferdiand to become the King of the Romans.
- February 10 – The Grünwald Conference takes place in the Duchy of Bavaria in Germany, as the co-rulers, Duke Wilhelm IV and Duke Ludwig X agreed to retain the traditional Roman Catholic Church but to make their own reformation of the church within the Duchy, beginning what will eventually become the Counter-Reformation.
- February 27 – Daniil of Volotsk is appointed by the Grand Duke of Moscow as the new Metropolitan of Moscow, becoming the leader of the Russian Orthodox Church.
- February 28 – The Viscount of Lautrec, leader of the French Army, spares the Italian residents of Treviglio from his plan of vengeance for their earlier resistance to the French troops, apparently after witnessing a miracle of seeing a fresco of the Virgin Mary shed tears.
- March 5 – In what is now the Karnataka state of India, Waliullah Shah is installed as the new ruler of Bahmani by the Sultan of Bidar, Amir Barid I.
- March 6 – Protestant reformer Martin Luther returns to Wittenberg in Germany after getting cleared to return home by his protector, Frederick the Wise, Elector of Saxony.
- March 9 –
  - In Zurich in Switzerland, the Affair of the Sausages begins as Pastor Huldrych Zwingli of Grossmünster publicly speaks out against the food restrictions during the Roman Catholic period of fasting during Lent, and advocating that followers of Martin Luther eat sausage, one of the prohibited foods. Zwingli defends his action in the sermon Von Erkiesen und Freiheit der Speisen ("Regarding the freedom of Choice of Foods"), in that the Bible does not prohibit the eating of meat during Lent. The public declaration sparks the Reformation in Zürich.
  - In Wittenberg, as the first day of Lent arrives, Martin Luther begins preaching the first of his eight "Invocavit sermons", stressing the primacy of core Christian values, such as love, patience, charity, and freedom, and reminding his followers to trust God's word rather than violence to bring about necessary change.
- March 31 – Charles V, Holy Roman Emperor, turns over control of the Duchy of Württemberg from the Duke Ulrich to the Emperor's brother, the Archduke Ferdiand of Austria

==== April–June ====
- April 27 – In the Battle of Bicocca, French and Swiss forces under Odet de Lautrec are defeated by the Spanish in their attempt to retake Milan, and are forced to withdraw into Venetian territory.
- May 10 –Pope Adrian VI, at the request of Spanish Emperor Carlos V, promulgates the papal bull Exponi nobis, allowing members of mendicant orders in the New World to exercise "almost all episcopal authority" when the closest Roman Catholic diocesan bishop is more than two days of travel away.
- May 15 – At Coyoacán in Mexico (at the time, the colony of New Spain) Spanish conquistador Hernán Cortés sends his third report to the Emperor Carlos V, describing the events of the last two years, including the conquest of Tenochtitlan, capital of the Aztec Empire.
- May 28 – The Ottoman Empire's siege of Knin in the Kingdom of Croatia is successful as Mihajlo Vojković surrenders to Gazi Husrev Bey and most of the Croatian inhabitants are allowed to leave. Inhabitants of Bosnia then move in.
- May 29 – England formally declares war on France and Scotland.
- May 30 – In Italy, the siege of Genoa, defended by France against the Holy Roman Imperial armies of General Fernando d'Avalos, ends after 10 days as the Imperial troops overrun the city. Since Genoa had refused to surrender, the Imperial troops are permitted to pillage the fallen city.
- June 19 – Charles V, Holy Roman Emperor visits King Henry VIII of England, and signs the Treaty of Windsor, pledging a joint invasion of France, bringing England into the Italian War of 1521–1526.

==== July–September ====
- July 4 – Brought on ships across the English Channel, an English fleet and army under the command of Thomas Howard, Earl of Surrey, attacks Brittany and Picardy after landing at Le Dourduff-en-Mer, near Calais, and burns and loots the countryside.
- July 23 – A counter-attack by local peasants and the French Army defeats the English Army in the first Battle of Morlaix, the day after the English pillage the town of Morlaix and begin loading their treasure on to their ships. When the French Army, commanded by Guy XVI de Laval, arrives, it finds that most of the English soldiers are either sleeping or drunk after having celebrated a conquest, and about 700 English soldiers are massacred.
- July 28 – Ottoman Sultan Suleiman I begins his siege to expel the Knights of St. John in Rhodes.
- August 3 – Lord Erskine is appointed by Margaret Tudor, regent of Scotland, to be the "keeper" of Margaret's 10-year-old son, King James V, who is to remain within the confines of Erskine's home at Stirling Castle.
- August 15 – Ottoman General Mehmed-Bey of Nikopol enters Târgoviște and takes control of the Principality of Wallachia, now part of Romania, as Radu of Afumați is forced to flee.
- August 27 – The Knights' War erupts within the Holy Roman Empire as Franz von Sickingen leads a revolt against the Prince-Bishop of Trier and to seize the church properties within the Electorate of Trier
- August 31 – Pope Adrian VI is crowned at St. Peter's Basilica in Rome.
- September 6 – A group of 18 men, commanded by Captain Juan Sebastián Elcano, and including Antonio Pigafetta, Maestre Anes and Juan de Zubileta become the first people to have traveled around the world. Arriving on the ship Victoria, they had set off as part of 270 sailors on five ships on the Magellan expedition almost three years earlier. They return to the Spanish port of Sanlúcar de Barrameda, from where they had departed on September 20, 1519.
- September 21 – Luther Bible: Martin Luther's translation of the Bible's New Testament into Early New High German from Greek, Das newe Testament Deutzsch, is published in Germany, selling thousands in the first few weeks.
- September 22 – A 6.8 magnitude earthquake kills more than 2,500 people in the Spanish city of Almería, near Alhama de Almería. It has a maximum felt intensity of X–XI (extreme), making it the most destructive earthquake in Spanish history, and destroys the city, as well as damaging 80 other towns; in Granada, large cracks are observed in various walls and towers.

==== October–December ====
- October 22 – An EMS-X intensity earthquake kills more than 4,000 people on the Azores Islands as its strikes Vila Franca do Campo, the provincial capital, located on São Miguel Island.
- November 17 – The second Diet of Nuremberg opens to discuss various matters of the Holy Roman Empire, including the Protestant Reformation.
- December 18 – The Ottomans finally break into Rhodes, but the Knights continue fierce resistance in the streets.
- December 20 – Suleiman the Magnificent accepts the surrender of the surviving Knights in Rhodes, who are allowed to evacuate. They eventually re-settle on Malta, and become known as the Knights of Malta.

==== Date unknown ====
- The third edition of Erasmus's Greek Textus Receptus of the New Testament, Novum Testamentum (with parallel Latin text), is published in Basel.
- Chinese Ming dynasty War Ministry official He Ru is the first to acquire the Portuguese breech-loading culverin, while copies of them are made by two Westernized Chinese at Beijing, Yang San (Pedro Yang) and Dai Ming.
- Australia is sighted by a Portuguese expedition led by Cristóvão de Mendonça, who maps the continent and names it Jave la Grande ("The Greater Java"), according to the theory of the Portuguese discovery of Australia.
- The Portuguese ally with the Sultanate of Ternate and begin the construction of Fort Kastela.
- The Portuguese, allied with King Ilato of the Goratalo kingdom, construct the Otanaha Fortress.

=== 1523 ===
==== January–March ====
- January 20 – Christian II is forced to abdicate as King of Denmark and Norway after the nobles of the herredag at Viborg have renounced their allegiance in favor of his uncle, Frederick, Duke of Holstein. Christian is exiled to the Netherlands in April.
- February 15 – Construction of Fort Kastela by Portuguese invaders, on what is now the island of Ternate in Indonesia, is completed as Portugal claims the Spice Islands (now the Maluku Islands).
- February 25 – Battle of al-Shihr on the Arabian Peninsula (in what is now Yemen): Troops from Portugal fight against the Kathiri Sultanate, ruled by the Emir Mutran bin Mansur. After a battle of one day, the Portuguese sack the capital, Al-Shihr, and establish a port on the Indian Ocean.
- February 27 – Captain Antón Mayor formally claims for Spain what is now Nicaragua, after he arrives with Andrés Niño and other Spanish troops on the Central American coast at El Realejo.
- March 8 – In Spain's Kingdom of Valencia, a rebellion by the Brotherhoods of Mallorca is suppressed after two years, as the rebels surrender their capital, Palma de Mallorca, to Spanish and German troops.
- March 26 – Frederick I is provisionally declared as King of Denmark by Danish nobles at Viborg, although loyalists at Copenhagen refuse to recognize his claim to the throne. Christian II, 1481-1559, regent 1513-1523.

==== April–June ====
- April 4 – Under a plan organized by Sister Katharina von Bora and Protestant reformer Martin Luther, fish merchant Leonhard Köppe helps carry out the rescue of Von Bora and other Cistercian Catholic nuns from the Nimbschen Abbey in Germany near Grimma and Leipzig. On the day before Easter, Köppe arrives at the convent under the pretext of bringing delivering herring and other foods to the Abbey, then uses empty barrels to smuggle the nuns to Wittenberg. Von Bora will later become Luther's wife.
- April 12 – The Spanish conquest of Nicaragua continues as Gil González Dávila and 17 other soldiers arrive at Lake Nicaragua and claim it for the Spanish crown, calling the freshwater source the Mar Dulce. Gonzalez and 100 men with him have been welcomed by Macuilmiquiztli Nicarao, leader of the friendly Nicarao people, to explore the area.
- April 14 – Mirza Shah Hossein, Grand Vizier of Persia since 1514, is assassinated in Qazvin (now in Iran) by Shia nobles of the Qizilbash sect, and replaced by Jalal al-Din Mohammad Tabrizi.
- April 15 – Sir Thomas More, noted for being a Catholic social philosopher and author of the 1516 novel Utopia, is appointed by King Henry VIII as the Speaker of the English House of Commons for the first parliamentary session since 1515. He serves until the Parliament adjourns on August 15.
- April 17 – In Nicaragua, Diriangén, ruler of the Chorotega speakers, stages an attack on the Spanish invaders led by González Dávila. Having been warned by one of the Nicarao natives of the intended surprise attack, Spanish defenders on horses rout the Chorotega, but several of the Spaniards are wounded. The Spanish then decide to proceed no further inland.
- April 23 – Charles V, Holy Roman Emperor, brings the Spanish Inquisition to the Netherlands with the appointment of Frans Van der Hulst as the inquisitor general of the Seventeen Provinces, which will later become parts of the Belgium, France, Luxembourg and the southern Netherlands.
- April 24 – The Diet of Hungary, parliament for the Kingdom of Hungary under King Lajos II, passes a decree ordering the confiscation of property and execution of all followers of Martin Luther within the Kingdom.
- May 6 – In the Rhineland in Germany, the Knights' War, led by Franz von Sickingen since August 27, is finally put down at Landstuhl by troops of the Holy Roman Empire as the Nanstein Castle falls. Sickingen, mortally wounded in the final battle, dies of his wounds the next day.
- May 5 – An assassination attempt is made against King Sigismund of Poland, who is shot at while walking outside his residence at Wawel Castle overlooking Kraków.
- May 20 – Andrea Gritti is elected as the new Doge of the Republic of Venice, 13 days after the death of Antonio Grimani.
- May 27 – Swedish War of Liberation: The city of Kalmar in Sweden, occupied by troops of Denmark, falls to a Swedish Army force led by Arvid Västgöte after the city's magistrates agree to leave the northern gate of the city open. Kalmar Castle surrenders on June 4. With the fall of Kalmar, only Stockholm remains as a site of the Danish occupation.
- May 31 – Following the Battle of Sincouwaan at sea between the ships of the Chinese Empire and the Kingdom of Portugal, the Malay ambassador to China reluctantly departs from Guangzhou to present letters to the Portuguese governors of the occupied Malacca Sultanate, demanding the restoration of the deposed Sultan. Though fearing execution by the Portuguese, the messengers are allowed to leave. They return in September with a plea for help from the Malay Sultan, whose territory is under attack from the Europeans.
- May – The Ningbo incident: Two rival trade delegations from Japan feud in the Chinese city of Ningbo, resulting in the pillage and plunder of the city.
- June 3 – Santhome Church is established by Portuguese explorers over the tomb of Saint Thomas the Apostle at Madras (now Chennai) in India.
- June 6 – Gustav Vasa is elected king of Sweden, finally establishing the full independence of Sweden from Denmark, which marks the end of the Kalmar Union. This event is also traditionally considered to be the establishment of the modern Swedish nation.
- June 10 – Frederick begins the 8-day siege of Copenhagen, the capital of Denmark. The city surrenders on 6 January 1524.
- June 12–July 19 – Franconian War: The Swabian League destroys 23 robber baron castles.
- June 17 – Swedish War of Liberation: The surrender of Stockholm by Denmark is accepted by Sweden's King Gustav Vasa. In return, the city's defenders are allowed safe passage out of Sweden. King Gustav then makes his triumphant entry to the city on June 24.
- June 23 – The Spanish expedition into Nicaragua ends as the Europeans arrive back in Panama in canoes, having been forced to abandon their ships.
- June 27 – Pargali Ibrahim Pasha is appointed as Grand Vizier of the Ottoman Empire by Suleiman the Magnificent. He will serve as the Ottoman administrator for almost 13 years until his sudden arrest and execution in 1536.

==== July–September ====
- July 1 – Jan van Essen and Hendrik Vos become the first Lutheran martyrs, burned at the stake in Brussels at the Grote Markt. In response to the executions, Martin Luther composed a hymn called "A New Song Be By Us Begun".
- July 7 – Wijerd Jelckama, a Frisian warlord and military commander, is executed in Leeuwarden, ending the Frisian rebellion fought by the Arumer Black Heap.
- July 25 – In what is now Mexico, the conquistador Gonzalo de Sandoval founds the city of Colima.
- July 29 – The Republic of Venice and the Holy Roman Empire conclude the Treaty of Worms to remove Venice from the Italian War that has gone for two years.
- c. July – Martin Luther's translation of the Pentateuch into German (Das allte Testament Deutsch) is published by Melchior Lotter Jr. in Wittenberg.
- August 22 – Lucien Grimaldi, Lord of Monaco, is assassinated by his nephew at the Prince's Palace. Bartolomeo Doria di Dolceaqua, the son of Lucien's sister Francesca, kills his uncle and then has his men drag the monarch's body down the palace stairs in front of a horrified crowd, who drive the Doria family out of the small principality. Lucien had become the ruler in 1505 after stabbing to death his brother, Jean II. Lucien's heir is his 8-month-old son, Honoré; Lucien's brother Augustine Grimaldi becomes the regent during Honoré's minority.
- September 14 – Pope Adrian VI, the last Dutch person to serve as head of the Roman Catholic Church, dies at age 64 after a reign of 21 months. For the next 455 years, all Popes elected will be Italian-born until the election of Karol Wojtyla of Poland in 1978 as Pope John Paul II.
- September 22 – Spanish conquest of Nicaragua: An agreement is made for an expedition by conquistadores into Nicaragua organized by Pedrarias Dávila.
- September 23 – After receiving word from Malaya that Portuguese forces were attacking the Sultanate of Patani and the Malacca Sultanate on the Malaysian peninsula, the China's Emperor Zhengde orders extermination of all persons from Portugal, 23 envoys from Portugal are executed and mutilated.

==== October–December ====
- October 1 – A conclave of 32 cardinals begins deliberations in Rome to elect a successor to the late Pope Adrian VI. Three other cardinals arrive on October 6 and balloting begins for a new Pope. Niccolò Fieschi and Bernardino López de Carvajal y Sande fail to receive the necessary majority in initial balloting, and Gianmaria del Monte comes within one vote (26 votes) of being elected. Voting continues for seven weeks before Cardinal Giulio de Medici wins 27 votes.
- October 27 – Hürrem Pasha, the Ottoman Empire's Governor-General of the Damascus Eyalet (which includes parts of what will become Syria, Israel, Jordan and Palestine) begins a punitive expedition through Lebanon against the Druze of Chouf. During the first campaign, Hürrem's troops burn 43 villages and kill at least 400 Druze.
- November 19 – Following the September 14 death of Pope Adrian VI, Cardinal Giulio de' Medici is elected 219th pope as Clement VII. The election of Cardinal Medici begins an unbroken reign of 44 consecutive Italian Popes over the next 455 years.
- November 26 – At Santa Maria in Via Lata, Cardinal Marco Cornaro carries out the coronation of Pope Clement at the church of Santa Maria in Via Lata in Rome.
- December 6 – Setting off from the Mexican Aztec capital of Tenochtitlan with an army of 550 Spanish soldiers and 120 horses, Pedro de Alvarado y Contreras begins the Spanish conquest of Guatemala.

==== Date unknown ====
- The Ming dynasty Chinese navy captures two Western ships with Portuguese breech–loading culverins aboard, which the Chinese call a fo–lang–ji (Frankish culverin). According to the Ming Shi, these cannons are soon presented to the Jiajing Emperor by Wang Hong, and their design is copied in 1529.
- In northern Italy, a French army under Guillaume Gouffier tries to recover Milan but fails due to an offensive by Spanish, Imperial and English troops and they retreat in mid-November.

=== 1524 ===
==== January–March ====
- January 17 – Florentine explorer Giovanni da Verrazzano, on board La Dauphine in the service of Francis I of France, sets out from Madeira for the New World, to seek out a western sea route to the Pacific Ocean.
- February 20 – Tecun Uman, the K'iche' Maya ruler of Guatemala's highlands, is killed in a battle near Quetzaltenango between the K'iche' Maya people and the invading Spanish conquistadors led by Pedro Alvarado.
- March 7 – Spanish conquistador Pedro de Alvarado destroys the Kʼicheʼ kingdom of Qʼumarkaj, taking the capital, Quiché.
- March 21 – da Verrazzano's expedition makes landfall at Cape Fear at what is later the U.S. state of North Carolina.

==== April–June ====
- April 17 – Verrazzano's expedition makes the first European entry into New York Bay, and sights the island of Manhattan.
- April 30 – Battle of the Sesia: Spanish forces under Charles de Lannoy defeat the French army in Italy, under William de Bonnivet. The French, now commanded by François de St. Pol, withdraw from the Italian Peninsula.
- May 23 – Tahmasp I becomes the ruler of the Safavid Empire, following the death of his father, Shah Ismail I.
- May 26 – Atiquipaque, the most important city of the Xinca people, is conquered by the Spanish, resulting in a significant reduction in the Xinca population.
- June 8 – Battle of Acajutla: Spanish conquistador Pedro de Alvarado defeats a battalion of Pipiles, in the neighborhoods of present day Acajutla, El Salvador.

==== July–September ====
- July 8 – Verrazzano's expedition returns to Dieppe.
- August 5 – Two days before his coronation in Denmark, Frederick I is elected King of Norway.
- August 7 – The coronation of Frederick I of Denmark takes place in Copenhagen.
- August 20 – The French city of Marseille is besieged by Holy Roman Empire forces commanded by the Charles III, Duke of Bourbon and lasts until September 26.
- August 22 – Protestant theologians Martin Luther and Andreas Karlstadt dispute at Jena.
- September 1 – By the Treaty of Malmö signed on Sweden withdraws from the Kalmar Union with Denmark and Sweden.
- September 5 – Portuguese explorer Vasco da Gama arrives on the island of Goa to become the new Viceroy of Portuguese India but dies three months later.
- September 13 – Spanish conquistador Francisco Pizarro, Hernando de Luque and Diego de Almagro all set off on the first of three expeditions to conquer Peru, taking along 80 men and 40 horses, but the venture is halted in Colombia.
- September 23 – The Bundesbrief is adopted by the members of the Three Leagues of Switzerland (the League of God's House, the League of the Ten Jurisdictions, and the Grey League) as a common constitution.

==== October–December ====
- October 28 – A French army invading Italy, under King Francis, besieges Pavia, months before the Battle of Pavia.
- November 1 – John Fleming, 2nd Lord Fleming, Lord Chancellor of Scotland since 1517, is assassinated by John Tweedie of Drummelzier (chief of Clan Tweedie) and others.
- November 15 – The Treaty of Tordesillas is signed between representatives of Honoré I, Lord of Monaco and of King Charles of Spain, and places Monaco under the protection of Spain.
- December 8 – Francisco Hernandez de Cordoba founds the city of Granada, Nicaragua, the oldest Hispanic city in the mainland America.

=== 1525 ===
==== January–March ====
- January 21 – The Anabaptist Movement is born when Conrad Grebel, Felix Manz, George Blaurock, and about a dozen others baptize each other in the home of Manz's mother on Neustadt-Gasse, Zürich, breaking a thousand-year tradition of church-state union.
- February 24 – Battle of Pavia: German and Spanish forces under Charles de Lannoy and the Marquis of Pescara defeat the French army, and capture Francis I of France, after his horse is wounded by Cesare Hercolani. While Francis is imprisoned in Lombardy and then transferred to Madrid, the first attempts to form a Franco-Ottoman alliance with Suleiman the Magnificent against the Habsburg Empire are made.
- February 28 – The last Aztec Emperor, Cuauhtémoc, is killed by Hernán Cortés.
- March 20 – In the German town of Memmingen, the pamphlet The Twelve Articles: The Just and Fundamental Articles of All the Peasantry and Tenants of Spiritual and Temporal Powers by Whom They Think Themselves Oppressed is published, the first human rights related document written in Europe.

==== April–June ====
- April 4 – German Peasants' War in the Holy Roman Empire: Battle of Leipheim – The peasants suffer great losses when they are attacked by Georg, Truchsess von Waldburg and the town of Leipheim is forced to surrender. Four peasant leaders are beheaded, including Jakob Wehe and Ulrich Schoen.
- April 10 – Albert, Duke of Prussia commits Prussian Homage.
- May 14–15 – German Peasants' War: Battle of Frankenhausen – Insurgent peasants led by radical pastor Thomas Müntzer are defeated. Following the defeat, Müntzer is executed in front of the gates of Mühlhausen.
- June 13 – Martin Luther marries ex-nun Katharina von Bora. The painter Lucas Cranach the Elder is one of the witnesses.
- June 18 – Henry VIII of England appoints his six-year old illegitimate son Henry FitzRoy Duke of Richmond and Somerset.
- June 23–24 – German Peasants' War: Battle of Pfeddersheim – Peasants are defeated in the last significant action of the war, in which over 75,000 peasants have been killed.

==== July–September ====
- July 29 – Santa Marta, the first city in Colombia, is founded by Spanish conquistador Rodrigo de Bastidas.
- August 13 – The coronation of Sophie of Pomerania as Queen consort of Denmark takes place in Copenhagen, a little more than a year after her husband's coronation as King Frederick I. She is granted Lolland and Falster, the castles in Kiel and Plön, and several villages in Holstein for her income.
- August 30 – The French ambassador to England and King Henry VIII sign the Treaty of the More at a castle, "The More", in Hertfordshire.
- September 14 – In Switzerland, the burning of most of the book collection of the Stiftsbibliothek of the Grossmünster Abbey in Zurich begins, by order of Huldrych Zwingli, as part of the Swiss Reformation. After 20 days of destruction of a collection built since 1259 for over 250 years, only 470 volumes are left.
- September 24 – Jeremias I is restored to the position of Ecumenical Patriarch of Constantinople, leader of the Eastern Orthodox Christian church, by order of the Ottoman Empire Sultan Suleiman the Magnificent.

==== October–December ====
- October 10 – the Earl of Angus, Scotland's Lord Warden of the Marches in charge of border security on the boundary with England, is able to work out a three-year peace treaty with the Kingdom of England and signs the initial agreement at the English border town of Berwick-upon-Tweed.
- November 25 – Charles V, Holy Roman Emperor acting in his capacity as the King of Spain, issues an edict ordering the expulsion or conversion of the remaining Muslims in the Crown of Aragon, similar to that issued for the Crown of Castile by Queen Isabella in 1502. The order applies to the Kingdom of Valencia and the Principality of Catalonia.
- December 8 – A second edict is issued in Spain directing Spanish Muslims to show proof of baptism as Christians or to leave by the deadline of December 31 (for Valencia) or January 26 (for Aragon and Catalonia).
- December 31 – The deadline for Spanish Muslims to convert to Christianity in the Valencia is reached, after which remaining Muslims, or those who harbor them as fugitives, becomes punishable by forced exile, imprisonment or death.
- December – The first French ambassador to reach the Sublime Porte, Jean Frangipani, sets out for Constantinople.

==== Date unknown ====
- Mixco Viejo, capital of the Pocomans Maya State, falls to the Spanish conquistadores of Pedro de Alvarado (in modern-day Guatemala) after a three-month siege.
- European-brought diseases sweep through the Andes, killing thousands, including the Inca.
- The Bubonic plague spreads in southern France.
- Printing of the first edition of William Tyndale's New Testament Bible translation into English in Cologne is interrupted by anti-Lutheran forces and Tyndale flees to Worms (finished copies reach England in 1526).
- Printing of Huldrych Zwingli's New Testament 'Zürich Bible' translation into German by Christoph Froschauer begins.
- The Navarre witch trials (1525-26) begins.
- The Chinese Ministry of War under the Ming dynasty orders ships having more than one mast sailing along the southeast coast to be seized, investigated, and destroyed; this in an effort to curb piracy and limit private commercial trade abroad.
- Kasur established as a city by the Kheshgi tribe of Pashtuns from Kabul who migrate to the region in 1525 from Afghanistan.
- The Age of Samael ends, and the Age of Gabriel begins, according to Johannes Trithemius.

=== 1526 ===
==== January–March ====
- January 14 – Treaty of Madrid: Peace is declared between Francis I of France and Charles V, Holy Roman Emperor. Francis agrees to cede Burgundy and abandons all claims to Flanders, Artois, Naples, and Milan.
- January 26 – The deadline for Spanish Muslims to convert to Christianity or leave is reached in the Crown of Aragon and the Principality of Catalonia as decreed by the edict of November 25 by Charles V, Holy Roman Emperor acting in his capacity as King of Spain. The deadline for the Kingdom of Valencia had passed on December 31, 1525.
- February 6 – Suleiman the Magnificent, Sultan of the Ottoman Empire, agrees to form a military alliance with France, after King François I sends a proposal by way of his envoy, Jean Frangipani.
- February 9 – In Guatemala, a group of 16 deserters from the Spanish colonial army destroy Iximche, the capital of the indigenous kingdom of the Mayan Kaqchikel people, and burn the palace of the Ahpo Xahil
- February 15 – Spanish author Gonzalo Fernández de Oviedo y Valdés, commonly called "Oviedo", publishes th chronicle La Natural Hystoria De Las Indias (The Natural History of the Indies)
- February 21 – Lopo Vaz de Sampaio becomes the new Governor of Portuguese India following the February 2 death of the 30-year-old Governor Henrique de Meneses from gangrene resulting from a battle injury to his leg.
- February 25 – The Battle of Hisar Firoza is fought in what is now the Indian state of Haryana, between the Mughal Empire (whose army is led by Prince Humayun) and the Delhi Sultanate, led by Hamid Khan. Humayun, in his first command, leads the Mughals to victory.
- February 27 – The League of Torgau is formed as an alliance of German princes to oppose the 1521 Edict of Worms.
- March 7 – In Switzerland, the Canton of Zurich enacts a law directed against the Anabaptist movement, specifically outlawing a second baptism of an adult who was previously baptized as an infant, and makes the crime punishable by drowning. The penalty is enforced for the first time on January 5, 1527, when Felix Manz is executed.
- March 6 –
  - After a defeat in battle of Afghan soldiers of the Delhi Sultanate by the Mughal Empire, the Mughal Emperor Babur and Crown Prince Humayun arrange the execution of 100 captured Afghan prisoners by "blowing from a gun, the process of placing a tying a condemned prisoner to the mouth of a cannon and then firing.
  - King François I of France is released from captivity in Spain after having signed the Treaty of Madrid.
- March 10 – Charles V, Holy Roman Emperor and King of Spain, marries Princess Isabella of Portugal at the Alcázar of Seville palace in Spain.
- March 17 – King François I crosses from the Bidasoa River from Spain into France, while at the same time, his sons the Dauphin Prince François and Prince Henri, 8 and 5 at the time, cross into Spain to take his place as hostages to guarantee France's compliance with the Madrid Treaty. King François repudiates the treaty and the two boys remain captive for the next three years.
- March – The first complete printed translation of the New Testament of the Bible into the English language by William Tyndale arrives in England from Germany, where printing had been completed in Worms by Peter Schöffer the younger, towards the end of February.

==== April–June ====
- April 21 – Battle of Panipat: Babur becomes Mughal emperor, invades northern India and captures Delhi, creating the Mughal Empire, which lasts until 1857.
- May 22 – Francis repudiates the Treaty of Madrid and forms the League of Cognac against Charles, including Pope Clement VII, Milan, Venice, and Florence.
- May 23 – A transit of Venus occurs, the last before optical filters allow astronomers to observe them.
- June 9 – Emperor Go-Nara ascends to the throne of Japan.

==== July–September ====
- July 24 – Milan is captured by the Spanish.
- July 25 – The Spanish ship Santiago, from García Jofre de Loaísa's expedition, reaches the Pacific Coast of Mexico and drops anchor at the Gulf of Tehuantepec, becoming the first ship to sail from Europe to the west coast of North America.
- August 9 – Lucas Vázquez de Ayllón of Spain founded the failed colony, San Miguel de Gualdape in present-day Winyah Bay, Georgetown County, South Carolina. It was the first European settlement, as well as the first documented occurrence of enslavement of African peoples in what would later become the continental United States.
- August 15 – The first official translation is made of the New Testament into Swedish; the entire Bible is completed in 1541.
- August 21 – Spanish explorer Alonso de Salazar becomes the first European to sight the Marshall Islands, in the Pacific Ocean.
- August 29 – Battle of Mohács: The Ottoman army of Sultan Suleiman I defeats the Hungarian army of King Louis II, who drowns while retreating with his troops. Two rival groups seek to elect a successor to Louis. Suleiman takes Buda, while Archduke Ferdinand of Austria and John Zápolya, Prince of Transylvania, dispute the succession. As a result of the battle, Dubrovnik achieves independence, although it acknowledges Turkish overlordship.
- September 19 – Spanish Muslims who had hidden in the Sierra de Espadán mountain range in Valencia and who are led by Selim Almanzo are overwhelmed by a German contingent of 3,000 soldiers from the Holy Roman Empire. After their defeat, 5,000 adult Muslims (including old men and women) are massacred.

==== October–December ====
- October 23 – In October, Cuthbert Tunstall, the Roman Catholic Bishop of London, issues a proclamation directing followers to destroy all copies of Tyndale's New Testament.
- October 24 – The Bohemian Diet elects Archduke Ferdinand of the House of Habsburg as the King of Bohemia.
- November 10 – In eastern Hungary, at Székesfehérvár, a group of lesser nobles proclaims John Zápolya as proclaimed as the King of Hungary. The assembly proclaims the Eastern Hungarian Kingdom, with a capital at Buda.
- December 15 – (12th day of 11th month of Daiei 6) The siege of Kamakura takes place in Japan as the Uesugi clan defeats the Hōjō clan
- December 17 – At Pozsony in western Hungary (now Bratislava in Slovakia), the Diet elects the Archduke Ferdinand as the King of Hungary.

==== Date unknown ====
- Gunsmith Bartolomeo Beretta (in Italian) establishes the Beretta Gun Company, which will still be in business in the 21st century, making it one of the world's oldest firearm corporations.

=== 1527 ===
==== January–March ====
- January 1 – Croatian nobles elect Ferdinand I of Austria as King of Croatia in the Parliament on Cetin.
- January 5 – Felix Manz, co-founder of the Swiss Anabaptists, is drowned in the Limmat in Zürich by the Zürich Reformed state church.
- February 14 – Queen consort Mary of Hungary, named as regent for the kingdom upon the August 29 death of her husband Louis II, asks permission from the Hungarian Diet to step down as the regent for the newly elected Frederick of Habsburg, but is denied.
- February 21 – The Mughal–Rajput wars begin in India between the Emperor Babur of the Mughal Empire and states of the Rajput Confederacy, with the victory of the Rajput faction at the Battle of Bayana.
- February 24 –
  - Ferdinand of the House of Habsburg is formally crowned as King of Bohemia at Pressburg (now Bratislava in Slovakia).
  - The seven articles of the Schleitheim Confession are formally adopted by the Mennonite Anabaptist Christians at Schleitheim in the Canton of Schaffhausen in Switzerland.
- March 17 – In India, the Battle of Khanwa is fought as the Mughal Emperor Babur defeats Rajput ruler Rana Sanga. This and two other major Moghul victories lead to their domination of northern India. Dhaulpur fort is taken by Babur.
- March 25 – The Confederation of Shan States sacks Ava, the capital of the Ava Kingdom.

==== April–June ====
- April 30 – The Treaty of Westminster (1527), an alliance during the War of the League of Cognac, is signed.
- May 6 – Sack of Rome: Spanish and German troops led by the Duke of Bourbon sack Rome, forcing the Medici Pope Clement VII to make peace with Charles V, Holy Roman Emperor, marking the end of the High Renaissance. The Pope grows a beard in mourning.
- May 16 – In Florence, the Piagnon, a group devoted to the memory of Girolamo Savonarola, drive out the Medici for a second time, re-establishing the Republic of Florence until 1530.
- June 17
  - The Narváez expedition to conquer Florida sets sail from Spain.
  - The Protestant Reformation begins in Sweden. The Riksdag of the Estates in Västerås adopts Lutheranism as the state religion, in place of Roman Catholicism. This results in the confiscation of church property and dissolution of Catholic convents in accordance with the Reduction of Gustav I of Sweden.
- June 22 – Jakarta, modern-day capital of Indonesia, is founded as Jayakarta.

==== July–September ====
- July 5 – General Div Sultan Rumlu, the regent for the 13-year old Tahmasp I, the Safavid Shah of Iran, is assassinated and replaced by Chukha Sultan Tekali.
- July 25 – The Battle of Sződfalva is fought near Szeged in what is now Hungary, with an army of Hungarians and Romanian Transylvanians defeating a Serbian army led by Jovan Nenad, the self-proclaimed Emperor of the Serbs. The next day, Nenad is assassinated for his failure in battle.
- August 3 – The first known letter is sent from North America by John Rut, while at St. John's, Newfoundland, during his voyage to the New World.
- August 20
  - Sixty Anabaptists meet at the Martyrs' Synod in Augsburg.
  - Diet of Odense (Denmark): King Frederick I declares religious tolerance for Lutherans, permits marriage of priests and forbids seeking papal pallium (approval) for royal appointments of Church officials.
- September 27 – Battle of Tarcal: Ferdinand, future Holy Roman Emperor, defeats John Zápolya and takes over most of Hungary. John appeals to the Ottomans for help.

==== October–December ====
- October 5 – French and Venetian troops kill thousands of civilians in the Italian city of Pavia, even after the defenders agree to surrender.
- October 31 – Spanish conquistador Álvaro de Saavedra Cerón departs from Zihuatanejo in what is now Mexico on a voyage of exploration of the Pacific Ocean, along with three ships, Saavedra's flagship La Florida, and the vessels Espiritu Santo and Santiago.
- November 3 – Archduke Ferdinand of Austria is formally crowned as the King of Hungary at the Basilica of the Assumption of the Blessed Virgin Mary at Székesfehérvár.
- November 4 – In India, Puranmal becomes the new Raja of the Kingdom of Amber (now in the Indian state of Rajasthan) after his father, the Raja Prithviraj Singh I dies of wounds sustained in March in the Battle of Khanwa.
- November 15 – The lands of the Bishopric of Utrecht, now in the Netherlands, are ceded to control of the Habsburgs in return for assistance in suppressing a rebellion by the citizens of Utrecht.
- November 22 – Spain's conquest of Guatemala's highlands is completed as the capital of the colonial government is moved to the new city of Ciudad Vieja from Santiago de los Caballeros de Guatemala, near Iximche.
- November 23 – The Érdy Codex, the largest collection of Hungarian legends and Hungarian language literature, is completed on Saint Clement's Day by an unidentified Carthusian monk at the seminary of Nagyszombat in Hungary (now Trnava in Slovakia.
- December 6 – Pope Clement VII, held prisoner at the Castel Sant'Angelo since the sack of Rome in May, is released after seven months of captivity, along with 16 Roman Catholic cardinals.
- December 15 – Two of the three ships of Álvaro de Saavedra are separated from his own vessel, La Florida, during a storm. The Espiritu Santo and Santiago, sailing ahead of La Florida, are never heard from again.

==== Date unknown ====
- The second of the Dalecarlian rebellions breaks out in Sweden.
- Members of the University of Wittenberg flee to Jena in fear of the bubonic plague.
- In England, Bishop Vesey's Grammar School (at Sutton Coldfield, in the West Midlands) is founded by Bishop John Vesey; and Sir George Monoux College is founded as a grammar school at Walthamstow by Sir George Monoux, draper and Lord Mayor of London.
- The Ming dynasty government of China greatly reduces the quotas for taking grain, severely diminishing the state's capacity to relieve famines through a previously successful granary system.

=== 1528 ===
==== January–March ====
- January 12 – Gustav I of Sweden is crowned king of Sweden, having already reigned since his election in June 1523.
- January 26 – The Canton of Bern becomes the second in Switzerland to officially adopt Protestantism after 21-day debate, the Bern Disputation
- February 16 – Poland's King Stanisław II Augustus establishes the zloty as the Kingdom's official currency as part of an extensive monetary reform.
- February 29 – John Zápolya, ruler of the remaining eastern portion of Hungary after its the acquisition of the western section by the Habsburg Austrians, joins in an alliance with the Sultan Suleiman the Magnificent of the Ottoman Turks, receiving protection and autonomy in return for allowing Turkish occupation of his Eastern Hungarian Kingdom.
- February
  - Peasant uprising in Dalarna, Sweden: The rebel campaign fails, and the rebel leader, later known as Daljunkern, flees to Rostock.
  - Diego García de Moguer explores the Sierra de la Plata along the Río de la Plata, and begins to travel up the Paraná River.
- March 20 – The Battle of Szina is fought in the Kingdom of Hungary between the two rival kings, John Zápolya of Eastern Hungary and Archduke Ferdinand of Austria, the Habsburg King of Western Hungary. Zapolya and his 15,000-man army are defeated by mercenaries hired by the Habsburgs.
- March 22 – siege of the southern Italian city of Melfi is started by the French Army, under the command of Marshal Odet of Foix, Viscount of Lautrec. After killing the defenders and pulling down the city walls, the French troops plunder what remains and massacre more than 3,000 men, women and children.

==== April–June ====
- April 28 – Battle of Capo d'Orso: The French fleet, under mercenary captain Filippino Doria, crushes the Spanish squadron trying to run the blockade of Naples.
- May 9 – King James V of Scotland, 16, held captive for more than two years under the guardianship of the Earl of Angus, is able to escape from Edinburgh to Stirling after several failed rescue attempts.
- June 5 – The fourth major outbreak of the sweating sickness is noted for the first time, with a reference in a letter to Bishop Tunstall of London from someone who has fled his home because a servant at his house has become infected with the disease, with sweating soon followed by death.
- June 17 – The Italian city of Rimini and its surrounding area, ruled by the House of Malatesta, is conquered by troops of the Papal States and subsequently annexed.

==== July–September ====
- July 3 – Pope Clement VII issues the bull Religionis zelus, recognizing the Order of Friars Minor Capuchin (Ordo Fratrum Minorum Capuccinorum), commonly known as the Capuchin monks, as a reformist branch of the Franciscans order of Roman Catholicism.
- July 8 – After surviving a mutiny of his crew and the death of 18 of his men in an ambush in what is now Argentina, Italian Venetian explorer Sebastian Cabot dispatches his flagship, Trinidad, back to Spain with reports and evidence against the mutineers, and a request for further military aid.
- August 4 – The "Peace of St. Ambrose" is signed in Milan at the Basilica of Sant'Ambrogio, bringing an end to the civil strife between the Milanese nobility and the local merchants.
- August 26 – Askia Muhammad I, ruler of the Songhai Empire in West Africa since 1493, is forced to abdicate by his son, Askia Musa, who declares himself to be the new Songhai Emperor.
- August 29 – The Siege of Naples, at the time a part of the Holy Roman Empire, fails four months after it was launched by troops from France, led by Odet de Foix, who had died of illness on August 15. The Imperial, Spanish and Genoese armies pursue their French attackers, who were attempting to retreat to the nearby city of Aversa, and eliminate the survivors.
- September 3 – The Kyōroku era begins in Japan, with the last day of the Daiei era ending on Daiei 8, 20th day of the 8th month.
- September 12 – Italian Admiral Andrea Doria defeats his former allies, the French, and establishes the independence of Genoa.
- September 19 – War of the League of Cognac: The Italian city of Pavia is besieged for the fifth and last time during the decade, after having been attacked in 1522, 1524, 1527, and in May of 1528. Troops from a coalition of the Venetian Republic, the Kingdom of France and the Duchy of Milan break through the city walls after six days of bombardment, kill 700 of the defenders, and recover the city for Francesco II Sforza, Duke of Milan.

==== October–December ====
- October 3 – Álvaro de Saavedra Cerón arrives in the Maluku Islands.
- October 13 – Cardinal Thomas Wolsey founds a college in his birthplace of Ipswich, England, which becomes the modern-day Ipswich School (incorporating institutions in the town dating back to 1299).
- October 20 – The Treaty of Gorinchem is signed between Charles V, Holy Roman Emperor, and Charles, Duke of Guelders.
- November 6 – Spanish conquistador Álvar Núñez Cabeza de Vaca and his companions become the first known Europeans to set foot on the shores of what is present-day Texas, when they and 80 survivors are wrecked on Galveston Island following a storm. Only 15 live beyond winter, and they are eventually enslaved by various Indian tribes. Eventually, only four of the 81 Spanish survivors— Cabeza de Vaca, Andrés Dorantes de Carranza, Alonso del Castillo Maldonado, and an African slave of Dorantes, Estevanico— are able to escape and return home.
- December 9 – A new, three-member executive junta is appointed by the King of Spain to govern New Spain and the West Indies, with Nuño Beltrán de Guzmán, Juan Ortiz de Matienzo, and Diego Delgadillo forming the first Audiencia Real. Beltran de Guzmán, Ortiz and Delgadillo succeed the two viceroys, Alonso de Estrada and Luis de la Torre. Beltran de Guzmán is designated as the President of the Audiencia.

==== Date unknown ====
- Montenegro gains autonomy under Ottoman power.
- Spanish Conquistador Francisco de Montejo attempts an invasion of the Yucatán, but is driven out by the Maya peoples.
- Spain takes direct control of Acapulco.
- Bubonic plague breaks out in England.
- St George's Chapel in Windsor Castle is completed.
- Chateau Fontainebleau in France is begun.
- Michelangelo Buonarroti begins work on the fortifications of Florence.
- Baldassare Castiglione publishes The Book of the Courtier.
- In Henan province, China, during the mid Ming dynasty, a vast drought deprives the region of harvests for the next two years, killing off half the people in some communities, due to starvation and cannibalism.
- Perak Sultanate and Johor Sultanate were established, both states being ruled by the sons of Mahmud Shah of Malacca.

=== 1529 ===
==== January–March ====
- January 6 – Basarab VI is installed as the new Prince of Wallachia (now in Romania) in the capital at Târgoviște, days after the assassination of the Voivode Radu of Afumați by the other boyars (Wallachian nobles). Basarab's reign lasts only a month and he is removed on February 5.
- January 8 – Zhang Qijie becomes the most powerful woman in Ming dynasty China as the primary wife of the Jiajing Emperor, shortly after the death of the Empress Xiaojiesu.
- January 20 – In India, the Mughal Emperor Babur departs from the capital at Agra toward Ghazipur to fight the Rajputs and the rebel Afghans who had captured the city.
- January 28 – Peter Vannes, the Italian-born envoy for England's King Henry VIII, arrives in Rome on a mission to get Pope Clement VII to give a dispensation for King Henry to divorce one wife and marry another, with both marriages to be declared valid. The mission fails.
- February 2 – The Örebro Synod provides the theological foundation of the Swedish Reformation, following the economic foundation of it, after the Reduction of Gustav I of Sweden.
- March 9 – The Battle of Shimbra Kure is fought in Ethiopia as the Imam Ahmad ibn Ibrahim al-Ghazi, with 12,000 men, including special forces armed with matchlock firearms, defeats the 200,000 man army of the Emperor Dawit II.
- March 25 – A blood libel is carried out against the Jewish community of Bosen in Hungary (now Pezinok in Slovakia), on the first day of Passover, after a boy in the town disappears. Three Jews are accused and killed. The boy is later discovered alive, having been kidnapped for the benefit of the scheme.

==== April–June ====
- April 8 – The Flensburg Disputation is held, a debate attended by Stadtholder Christian of Schleswig-Holstein (later King Christian III of Denmark), between Lutherans (led by Hermann Fast) and the more radical Anabaptists (led by Melchior Hoffman). Johannes Bugenhagen, a close associate of Martin Luther, presides. The Disputation marks the rejection of radical ideas by the Danish Reformation.
- April 9 – The Westrogothian rebellion breaks out in Sweden.
- April 19 – Diet of Speyer: A group of rulers (German: Fürst) and independent cities (German: Reichsstadt) protest the reinstatement of the Edict of Worms, beginning the Protestant movement.
- April 22 – The Treaty of Zaragoza divides the eastern hemisphere between the Spanish and Portuguese empires, stipulating that the dividing line should lie 297.5 leagues or 17° east of the Moluccas.
- May 10 – The Ottoman army under Suleiman I leaves Constantinople, to invade Hungary once again.
- May 31–July – Cardinal Thomas Wolsey, Archbishop of York, opens a legatine court at Blackfriars, London, to rule on the legality of King Henry VIII of England's marriage to Catherine of Aragon. The court lasts until July 16.
- June 21 –
  - War of the League of Cognac – Battle of Landriano: French forces in northern Italy are decisively defeated by Spain.
  - King Henry VIII and Queen consort Catherine of Aragon appear in person before the Blackfriars court, with Catherine making a pathetic display before the court and her husband, and the king making a speech about his uneasiness about his marriage.

==== July–September ====
- July 23 – The Blackfriars court is adjourned after word is received that Pope Clement VII has revoked its charter.
- July 30 – The only continental outbreak of English sweating sickness reaches Lübeck, spreading from there into Schleswig-Holstein in the next few months.
- August 5 – Charles V, Holy Roman Emperor, and Francis I of France sign the Treaty of Cambrai, or Ladies' Peace in the War of the League of Cognac: Francis abandons his claims in Italy, but is allowed to retain the Duchy of Burgundy. Henry VIII of England accedes on August 27.
- September 1 – Sancti Spiritu, the first European settlement in Argentina, is destroyed by local natives.
- September 8
  - Buda is recaptured by the invading forces of the Ottoman Empire.
  - The city of Maracaibo, Venezuela is founded by Ambrosius Ehinger.
- September 27 – Vienna is besieged by the Ottoman Turks commanded by Suleiman the Magnificent.

==== October–December ====
- October 15 – With the season growing late, Suleiman abandons the Siege of Vienna (a turning point in the Ottoman wars in Europe).
- October 26 – Cardinal Wolsey falls from power in England, due to his failure to obtain an annulment of Henry VIII's marriage and to prevent Habsburg expansion in Europe. Thomas More succeeds him as Lord Chancellor.
- November 4 – The English Reformation Parliament is first seated.
- December 17 – The first session of the Reformation Parliament ends.

==== Date unknown ====
- Aylesbury is granted the county town of Buckinghamshire, England by King Henry VIII.
- Stephen Báthory becomes governor of Transylvania.
- Borommarachathirat IV succeeds Ramathibodi II as king of Ayutthaya.
- Fluorite is first described, by Georg Agricola.
- Giorgio Vasari visits Rome.
- Pietro Bembo becomes historiographer of Venice.
- Heinrich Bullinger becomes pastor of Bremgarten, Switzerland.
- German polymath Heinrich Cornelius Agrippa publishes Declamatio de nobilitate et praecellentia foeminei sexus ("Declamation on the Nobility and Preeminence of the Female Sex"), a book pronouncing the theological and moral superiority of women.
- A summit level canal between Alster and the Trave in Germany opens to navigation.

== Births ==
1520

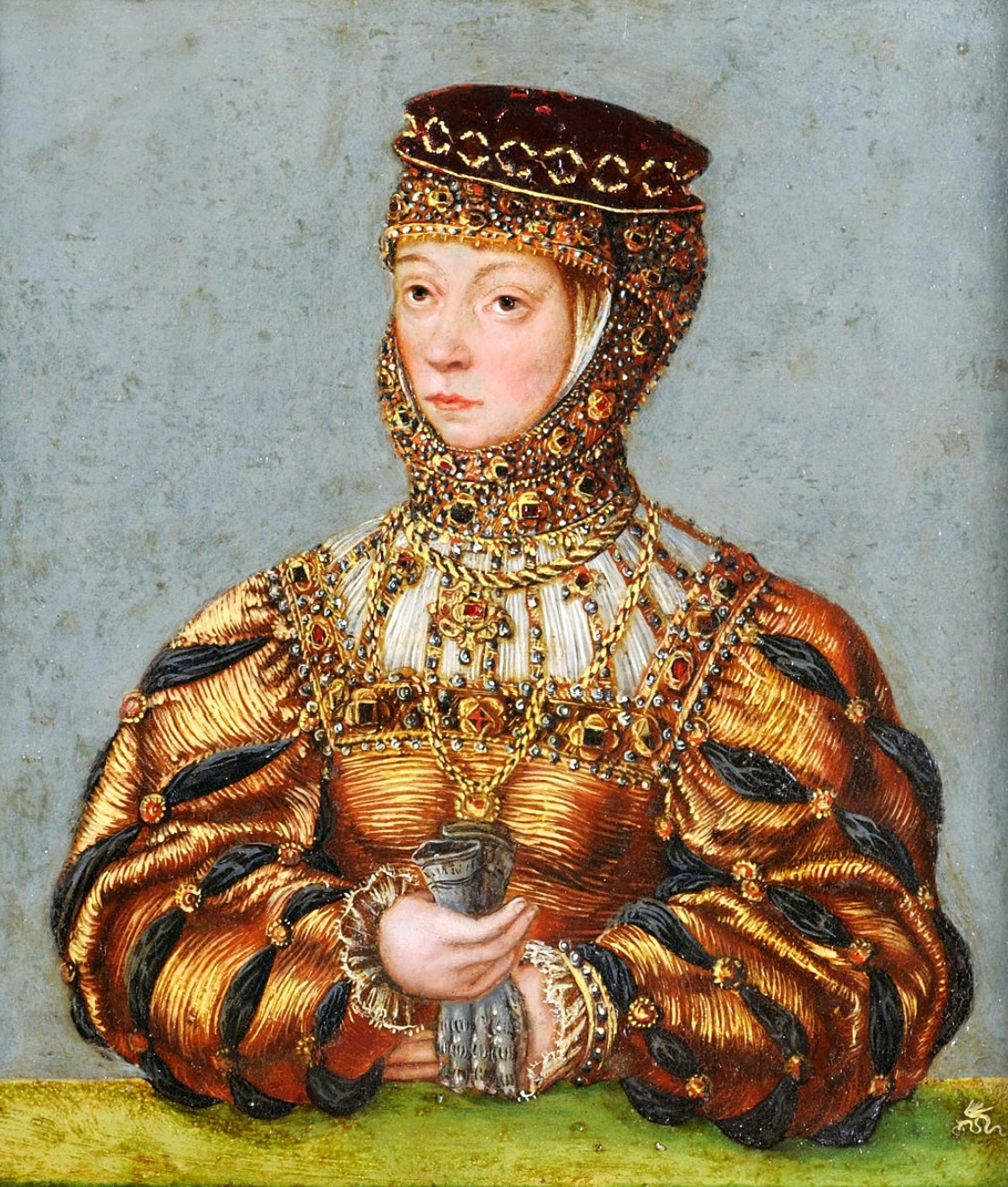
Barbara Radziwiłł

- January 7 – Peder Oxe, Danish finance minister (d. 1575)
- January 30 – William More, English courtier (d. 1600)
- February 22 – Frederick III of Legnica, Duke of Legnica (d. 1570)
- March 3 – Matthias Flacius, Croatian Protestant reformer (d. 1575)
- June 29 – Nicolás Factor, Spanish artist (d. 1583)
- July 27 – Gonzalo II Fernández de Córdoba, Governor of the Duchy of Milan (d. 1578)
- August 1 – King Sigismund II Augustus of Poland (d. 1572)
- August 10 – Madeleine of Valois, queen of James V of Scotland (d. 1537)
- August 21 – Bartholomäus Sastrow, German official (d. 1603)
- August 31 – Heinrich Sudermann, German politician (d. 1591)
- September 13 – William Cecil, 1st Baron Burghley, English statesman, chief advisor to Queen Elizabeth I (d. 1598)
- October 7 – Alessandro Farnese, Italian cardinal (d. 1589)
- November 10 – Dorothea of Denmark, Electress Palatine, Princess of Denmark, Sweden and Norway (d. 1580)
- December 6 – Barbara Radziwiłł, queen of Poland (d. 1551)
- December 24 – Martha Leijonhufvud, politically active Swedish noble (d. 1584)
- date unknown
  - Patriarch Metrophanes III of Constantinople (d. 1580)
  - Jean Ribault, French navigator (d. 1565)
  - Vincenzo Galilei, Italian music theorist, lutenist, and composer (d. 1591)
  - Aben Humeya, last independent king of Granada (d. 1568)
  - Ijuin Tadaaki, Japanese nobleman (d. 1561)
  - Agatha Streicher, German physician (d. 1581)
  - Katarina Bengtsdotter Gylta, Swedish abbess (d. 1593)
  - Johannes Acronius Frisius, German doctor and mathematician (d. 1564)
- probable
  - Hans Eworth, Flemish portrait painter (d. 1574)
  - Katharina Gerlachin, German printer (d. 1592)
  - Jorge de Montemor, Spanish novelist and poet (d. 1561)
  - Giovanni Battista Moroni, Italian mannerist painter (d. 1578)

1521

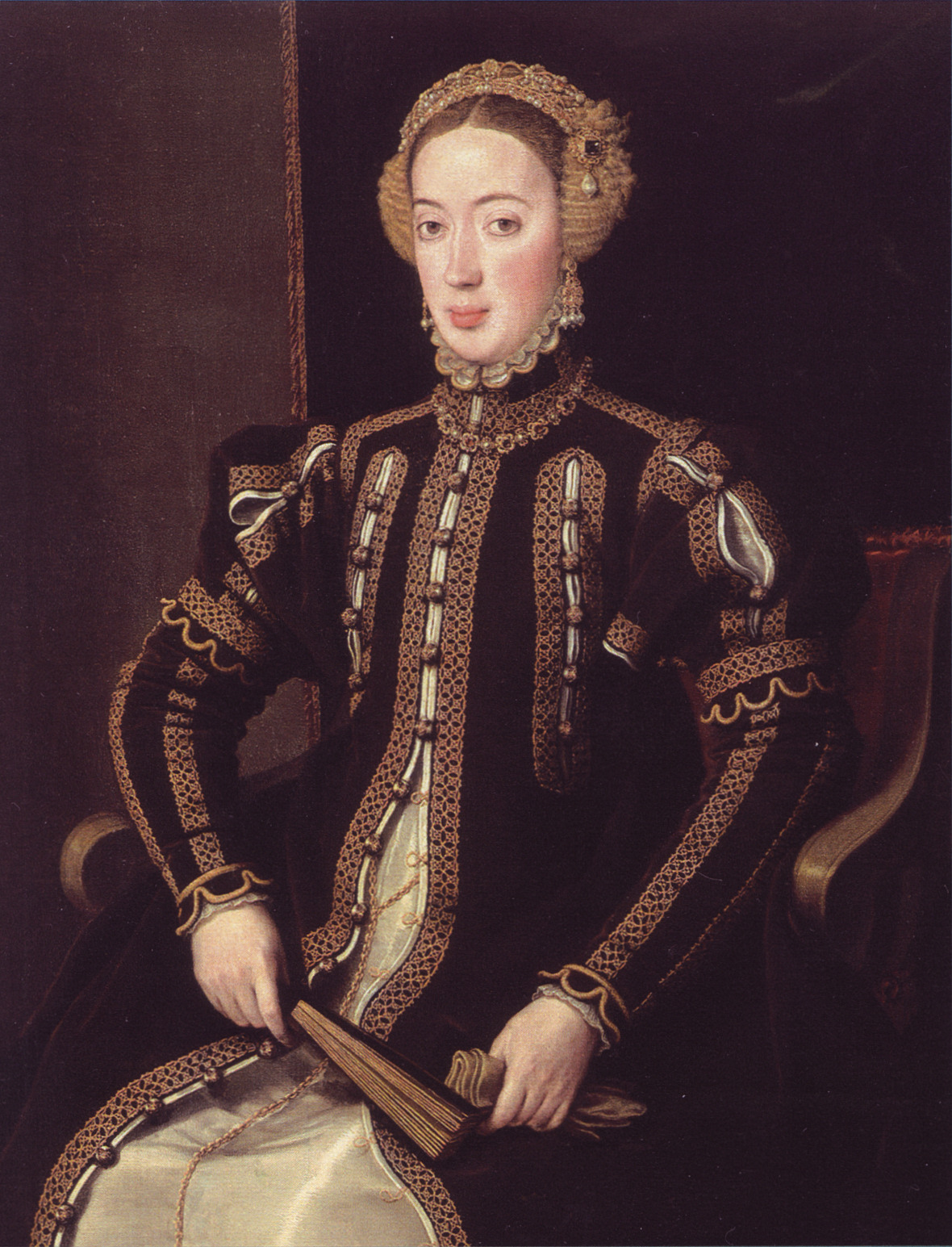
Maria of Portugal, Duchess of Viseu

- March 21 – Maurice, Elector of Saxony (d. 1553)
- April 5 – Francesco Laparelli, Italian architect (d. 1570)
- April 14 – Johann Marbach, German theologian (d. 1581)
- April 18 – François de Coligny d'Andelot, French general (d. 1569)
- May 8 – Petrus Canisius, Dutch Jesuit (d. 1597)
- May 10 – John Ernest, Duke of Saxe-Coburg, (d. 1553)
- June 8 – Maria of Portugal, Duchess of Viseu, daughter of King Manuel I (d. 1577)
- June 21 – John II, Duke of Schleswig-Holstein-Haderslev (d. 1580)
- August 4 – Pope Urban VII (d. 1590)
- August 19 – Lodovico Guicciardini, Italian historian (d. 1589)
- October 1 – Frederick Magnus I, Count of Solms-Laubach, (d. 1561)
- November 21 – Edmund Sheffield, 1st Baron Sheffield, English baron (d. 1549)
- November 29 – Marcantonio Maffei, Italian Catholic archbishop and cardinal (d. 1583)
- December 1 – Takeda Shingen, Japanese warlord (d. 1573)
- December 13 – Pope Sixtus V (d. 1590)
- date unknown
  - Anne Askew, English Protestant martyr (d. 1546)
  - John Aylmer, English divine (d. 1594)
  - Sue Harukata, Japanese retainer and later daimyō under Ōuchi Yoshitaka (d. 1555)
  - Thomas Chaloner, English statesman and poet (d. 1565)
  - Philippe de Monte, Flemish composer (d. 1603)
  - Rokkaku Yoshikata, Japanese daimyō (d. 1598)
  - Thomas Wyatt the Younger, English rebel (d. 1554)
- possible
  - Catherine Howard, fifth queen of Henry VIII of England, (b. between 1518 and 1524; d. 1542)

1522

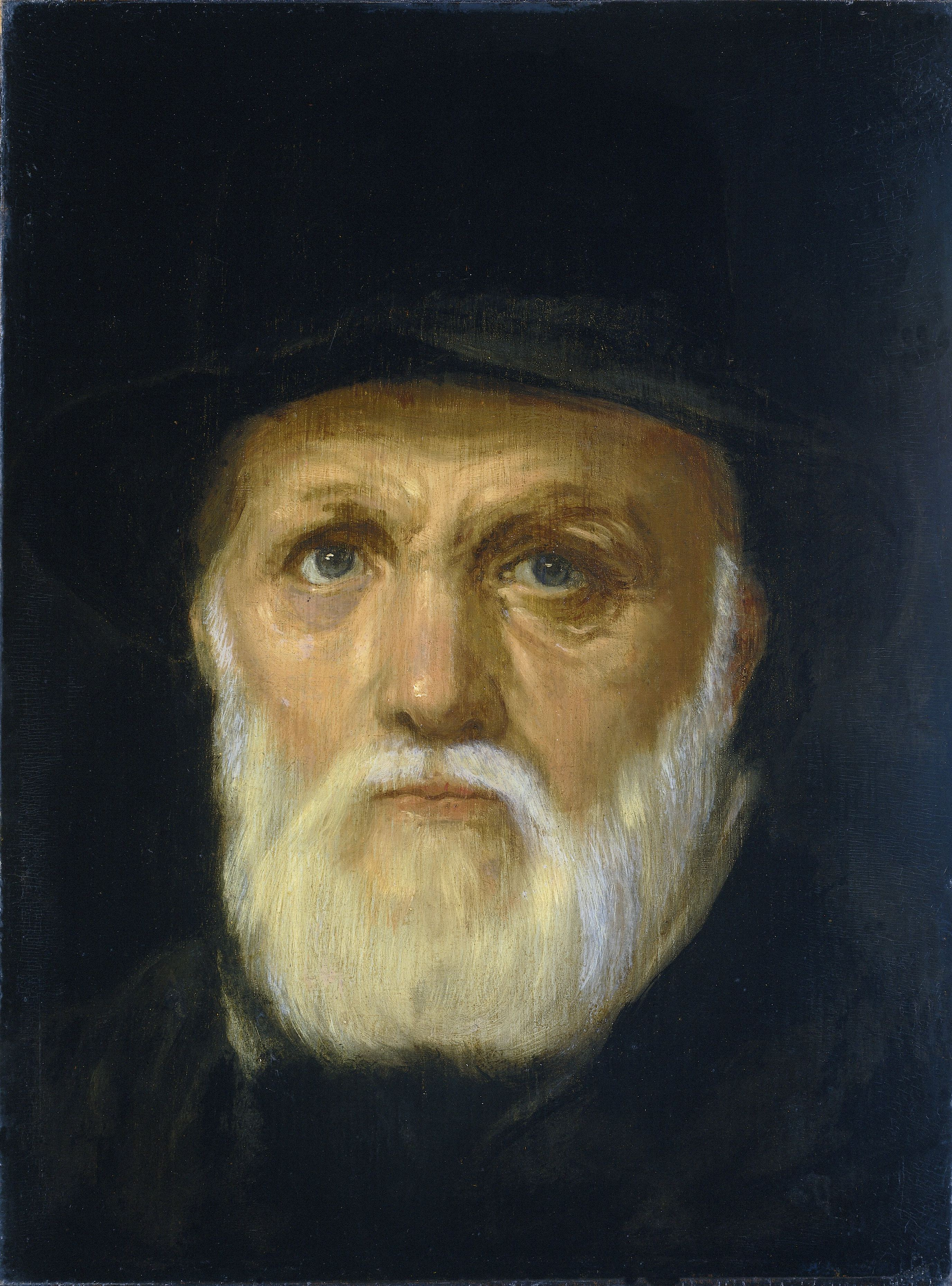
Dirck Coornhert

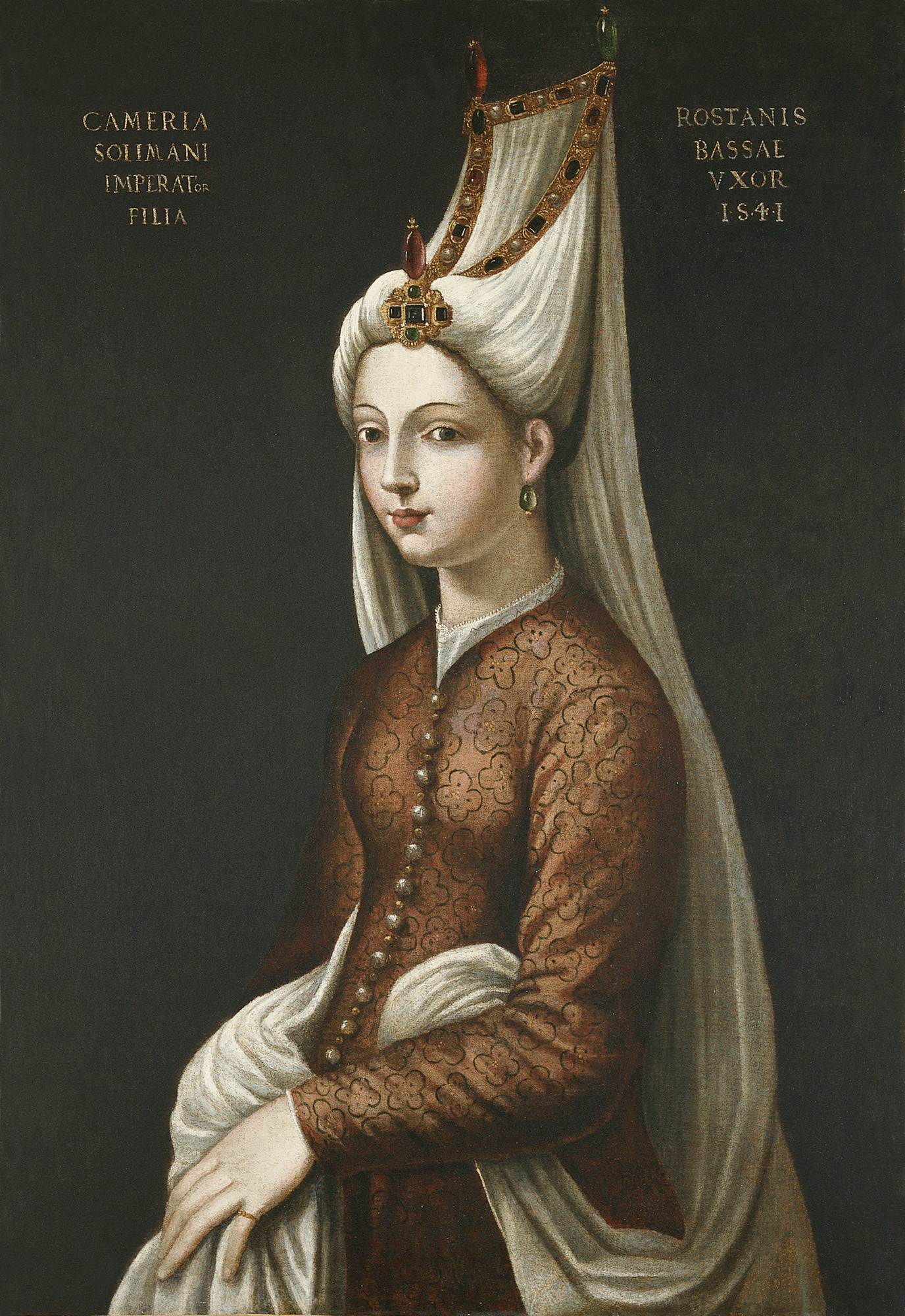
Mihrimah Sultan

- January 22 – Charles II de Valois, Duke of Orléans, (d. 1545)
- February 2
  - Lodovico Ferrari, Italian mathematician (d. 1565)
  - Francesco Alciati, Italian Catholic cardinal (d. 1580)
- March 10 – Miyoshi Nagayoshi, Japanese samurai and daimyō (d. 1564)
- March 22 – Daniel Brendel von Homburg, Roman Catholic archbishop (d. 1582)
- March 28 – Albert Alcibiades, German prince (d. 1557)
- April 23 – Catherine of Ricci, Italian prioress (d. 1590)
- May 24 – John Jewel, English bishop (d. 1571)
- June 1 – Dirck Volckertszoon Coornhert, Dutch writer and scholar (d. 1590)
- July 5 – Margaret of Austria, regent of the Netherlands (d. 1586)
- July 13 – Sophia Jagiellon, Duchess of Brunswick-Lüneburg (d. 1575)
- July 25 – Anna of Lorraine (d. 1568)
- July 31 – Charles II de Croÿ, Belgian duke (d. 1551)
- August 4 – Udai Singh II, King of Mewar (d. 1572)
- August 28 – Severinus of Saxony, Prince of Saxony; died young (d. 1533)
- September 11 – Ulisse Aldrovandi, Italian naturalist (d. 1605)
- October 4 – Gabriele Paleotti, Italian Catholic cardinal (d. 1597)
- October 14 – Lucas Maius, Lutheran Reformation pastor, theologian and playwright (d. 1598)
- November 1 – Andrew Corbet, English landowner and politician (d. 1578)
- November 4 – Albert de Gondi, Marshal of France (d. 1602)
- November 9 – Martin Chemnitz, Lutheran reformer (d. 1586)
- November 18 – Lamoral, Count of Egmont, Flemish general and statesman (d. 1568)
- December 16 – Honoré I, Lord of Monaco (d. 1581)
- date unknown
  - Mihrimah Sultan, Ottoman princess (d. 1578)
  - Moses ben Jacob Cordovero, Spanish Jewish rabbi and kabbalist (d. 1570)
  - Philothei, Greek saint (d. 1589)
  - Jacques Cujas, French legal expert (d. 1590)
- probable
  - Emperor Gelawdewos of Ethiopia (d. 1559)
- possible
  - Catherine Howard, fifth queen of Henry VIII of England, (b. between 1518 and 1524; d. 1542)

1523

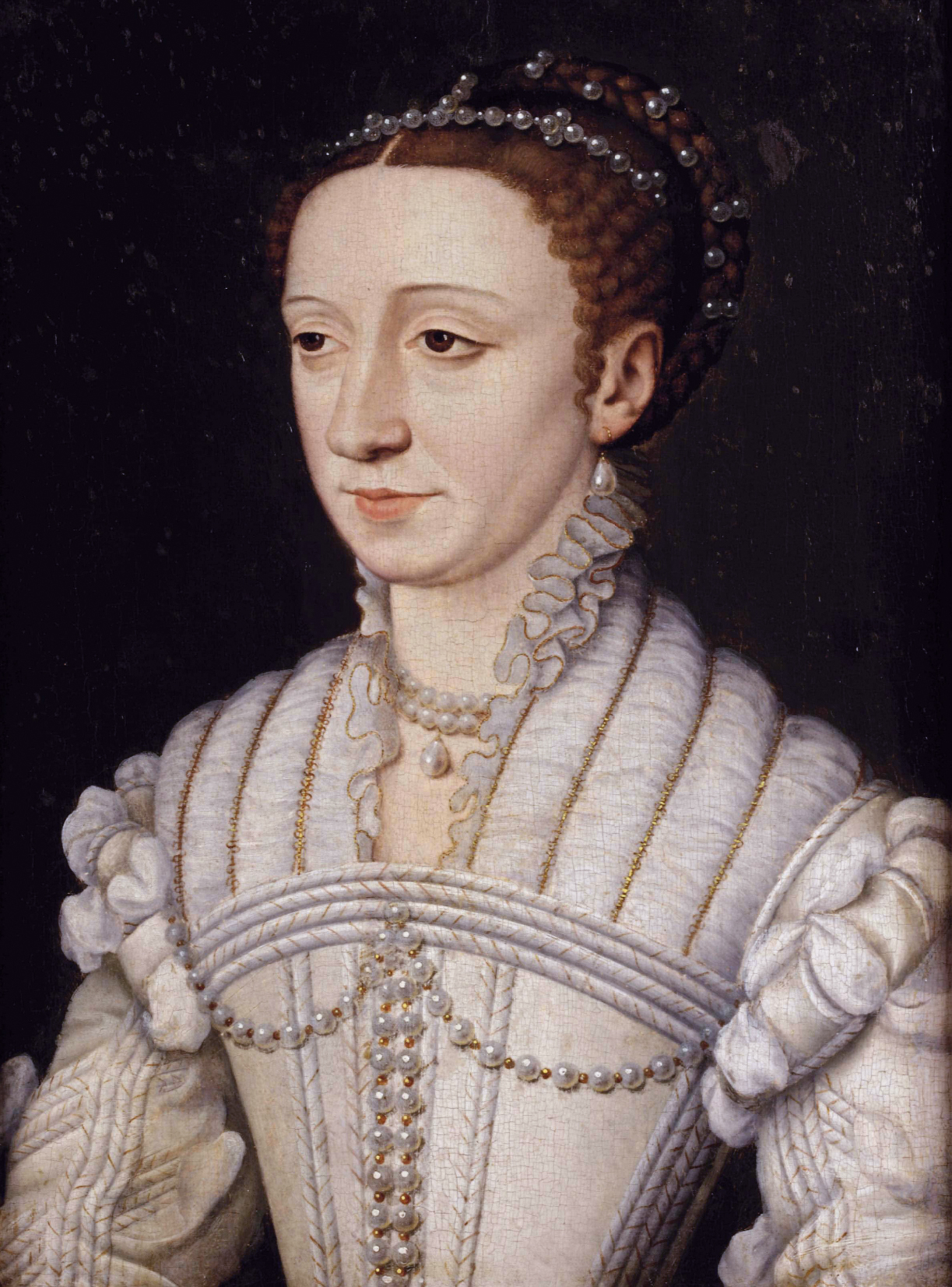
Margaret of France, Duchess of Berry

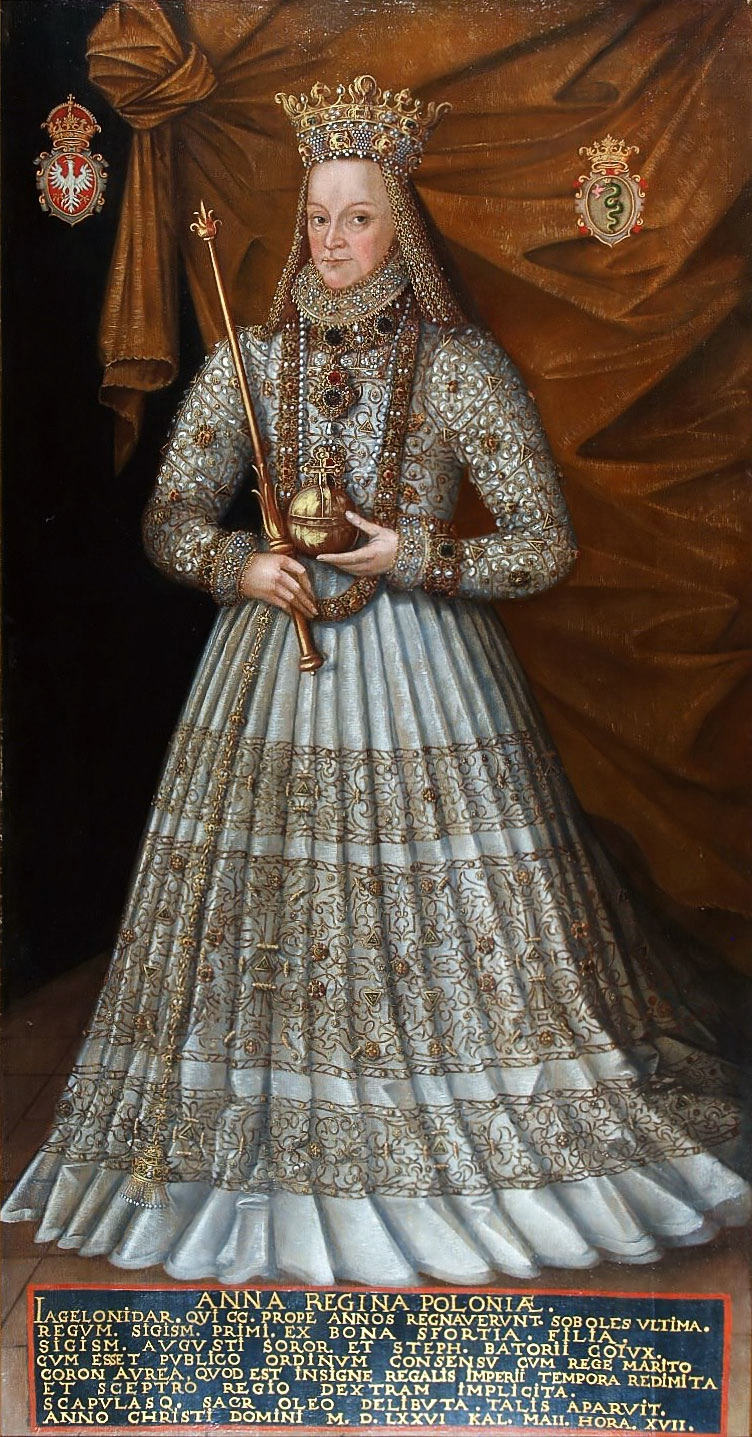
Queen Anna

- January 29 – Enea Vico, Italian engraver (d. 1567)
- February 1 – Francesco Abbondio Castiglioni, Italian Catholic cardinal (d. 1568)
- February 13 – Valentin Naboth, German astronomer and mathematician (d. 1593)
- February 20 – Jan Blahoslav, Czech writer (d. 1571)
- March 14 – Helena Magenbuch, German pharmacist (d. 1597)
- March 17 – Giovanni Francesco Commendone, Italian Catholic cardinal (d. 1584)
- March 21 – Kaspar Eberhard, German theologian (d. 1575)
- April 5 – Blaise de Vigenère, French diplomat and cryptographer (d. 1596)
- April 21 – Marco Antonio Bragadin, Venetian lawyer and military officer (d. 1571)
- June 5 – Margaret of France, Duchess of Berry (d. 1574)
- July 4 – Pier Francesco Orsini, Italian condottiero and art patron (d. 1583)
- July 18 – Duke George II of Brieg (1547–1586) (d. 1586)
- September 21 – Sancho d'Avila, Spanish general (d. 1583)
- September 22 – Charles, Cardinal de Bourbon, French church leader and pretender to the throne (d. 1590)
- October 10 – Ludwig Rabus, German martyrologist (d. 1592)
- October 11 – Eleonore of Fürstenberg, wife of Philip IV, Count of Hanau-Lichtenberg (d. 1544)
- October 18 – Anna Jagiellon, daughter of Sigismund I of Poland (d. 1596)
- date unknown
  - Gabriele Falloppio, Italian anatomist and physician (d. 1562)
  - Gaspara Stampa, Italian poet (d. 1554)
- probable
  - Crispin van den Broeck, Flemish painter (d. 1591)
  - Francisco Foreiro, Portuguese Dominican theologian and biblist (b. in 1522 or 1523; d. 1581)
- possible – Catherine Howard, fifth queen of Henry VIII of England, (b. between 1518 and 1524; executed 1542)

1524

- February 10 – Albrecht Giese, German politician and diplomat (d. 1580)
- February 17 – Charles, Cardinal of Lorraine, French cardinal (d. 1574)
- May 28 – Selim II, Ottoman Sultan (d. 1574)
- June 12 – Achilles Statius, Portuguese humanist (d. 1581)
- June 24 – Johann Stössel, German theologian (d. 1576)
- August 23 – François Hotman, French Protestant lawyer and writer (d. 1590)
- September 7 – Thomas Erastus, Swiss theologian (d. 1583)
- September 11 – Pierre de Ronsard, French poet (d. 1585)
- October 4 – Francisco Vallés, Spanish physician (d. 1592)
- October 5 – Rani Durgavati, Queen of Gond (d. 1564)
- October 9 – Ottavio Farnese, Duke of Parma (d. 1586)
- October 14 – Elizabeth of Denmark, Duchess of Mecklenburg, Danish princess (d. 1586)
- October 16 – Nicolas, Duke of Mercœur, French Catholic bishop (d. 1577)
- November 12 – Diego de Landa, Bishop of the Yucatán (d. 1579)
- date unknown
  - Jan Borukowski, royal secretary of Poland (d. 1584)
  - Armand de Gontaut, baron de Biron, French soldier (d. 1592)
  - Jean Pithou, French lawyer and author (d. 1602); and his twin brother, Nicolas Pithou, French lawyer and author (d. 1598)
  - Joseph Nasi, Portuguese Sephardi diplomat and administrator (d. 1579)
  - Thomas Tusser, English poet and farmer (d. 1580)
  - Luís de Camões, Portuguese poet (d. 1580)
  - Plautilla Nelli, Italian painter (d. 1588)
  - Wenceslaus III Adam, Duke of Cieszyn (d. 1579)
  - Catherine Carey, cousin of Elizabeth I of England (d. 1569)
  - Guyonne de Laval, French Huguenot magnate (d. 1567)
- possible
  - Catherine Howard, fifth queen of Henry VIII of England, (b. between 1518 and 1524; d. 1542)

1525

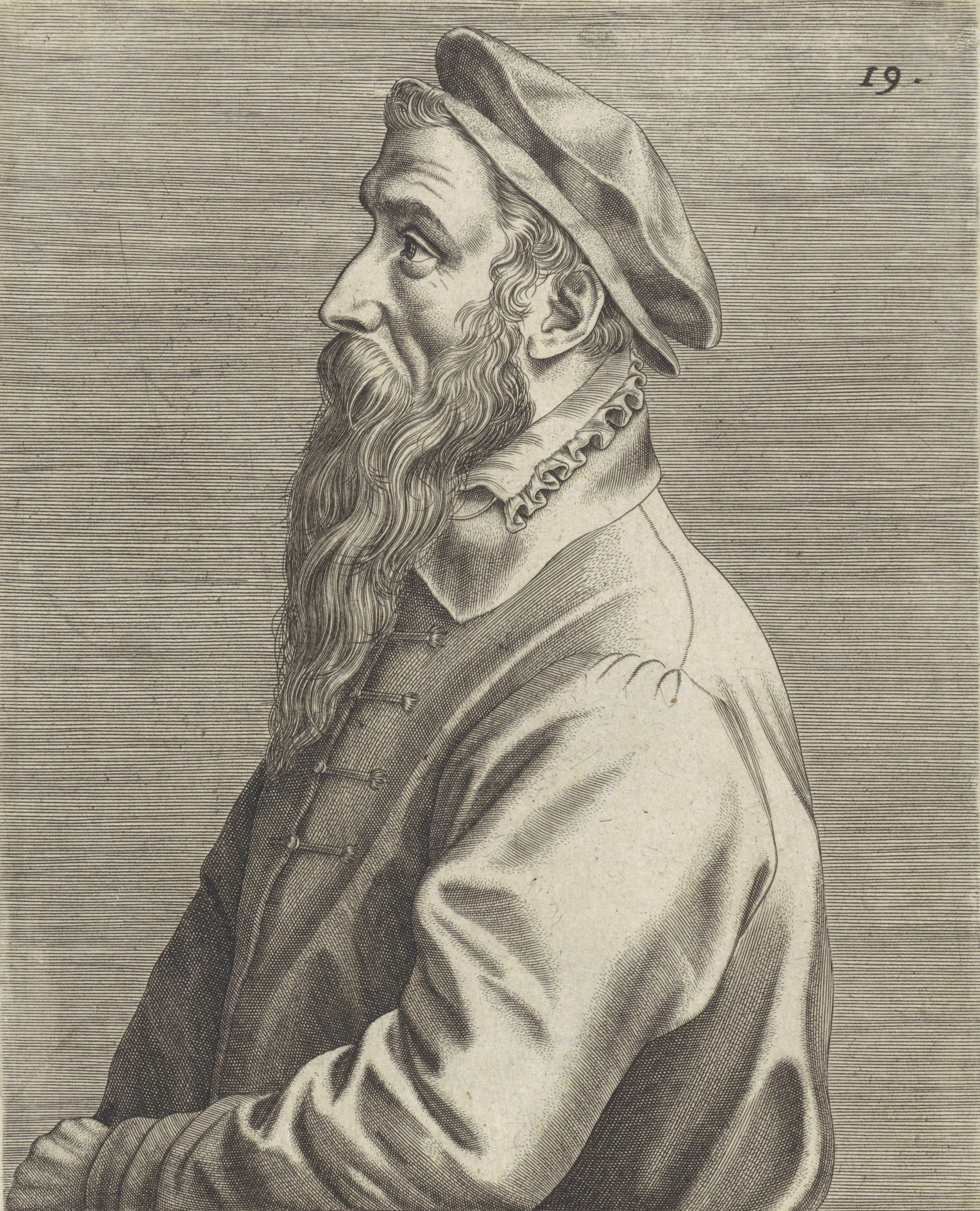
Pieter Bruegel the Elder

- January 29 – Lelio Sozzini, Italian Renaissance humanist and anti-Trinitarian reformer (d. 1562)
- February 5 – Juraj Drašković, Croatian Catholic cardinal (d. 1587)
- March 19 – Caspar Cruciger the Younger, German theologian (d. 1597)
- March 25 – Richard Edwardes, English choral musician, playwright and poet (d. 1566)
- March 26 – Katharina of Hanau, Countess of Wied, German noblewoman (d. 1581)
- June 1 – Caspar Peucer, German reformer (d. 1602)
- June 29 – Peter Agricola, German Renaissance humanist, educator, classical scholar, theologian, diplomat and statesman (d. 1585)
- September 1 – Christoffer Valkendorff, Danish politician (d. 1601)
- September 11 – John George, Elector of Brandenburg (d. 1598)
- September 25 – Steven Borough, English explorer (d. 1584)
- November 7 – Georg Cracow, German lawyer and politician (d. 1575)
- December 1 – Tadeáš Hájek, Czech astronomer (d. 1600)
- December 23 – John Albert I, Duke of Mecklenburg (d. 1576)
- date unknown – Maharal of Prague, Talmudic scholar, Jewish mystic and philosopher (d. 1609)
- probable
  - Pieter Bruegel the Elder, Flemish painter (d. 1569)
  - Baldassare Donato, Italian composer and singer (d. 1603)
  - Giovanni Pierluigi da Palestrina, Italian composer (d. 1594)
  - Hans Staden, German soldier and sailor (d. 1579)

1526

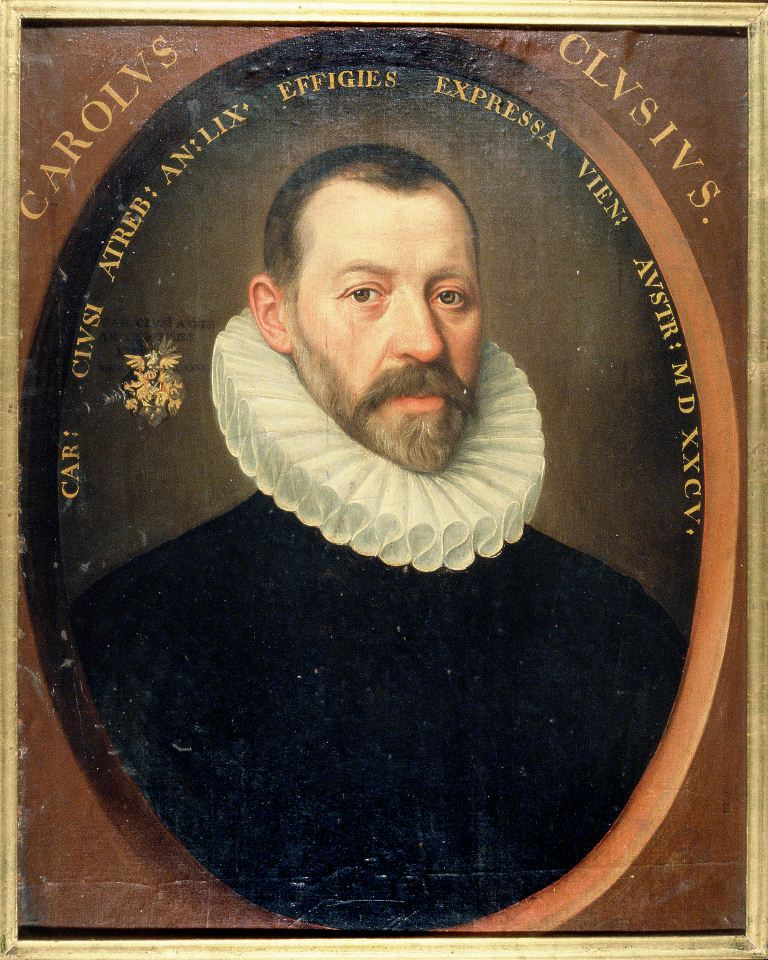
Carolus Clusius

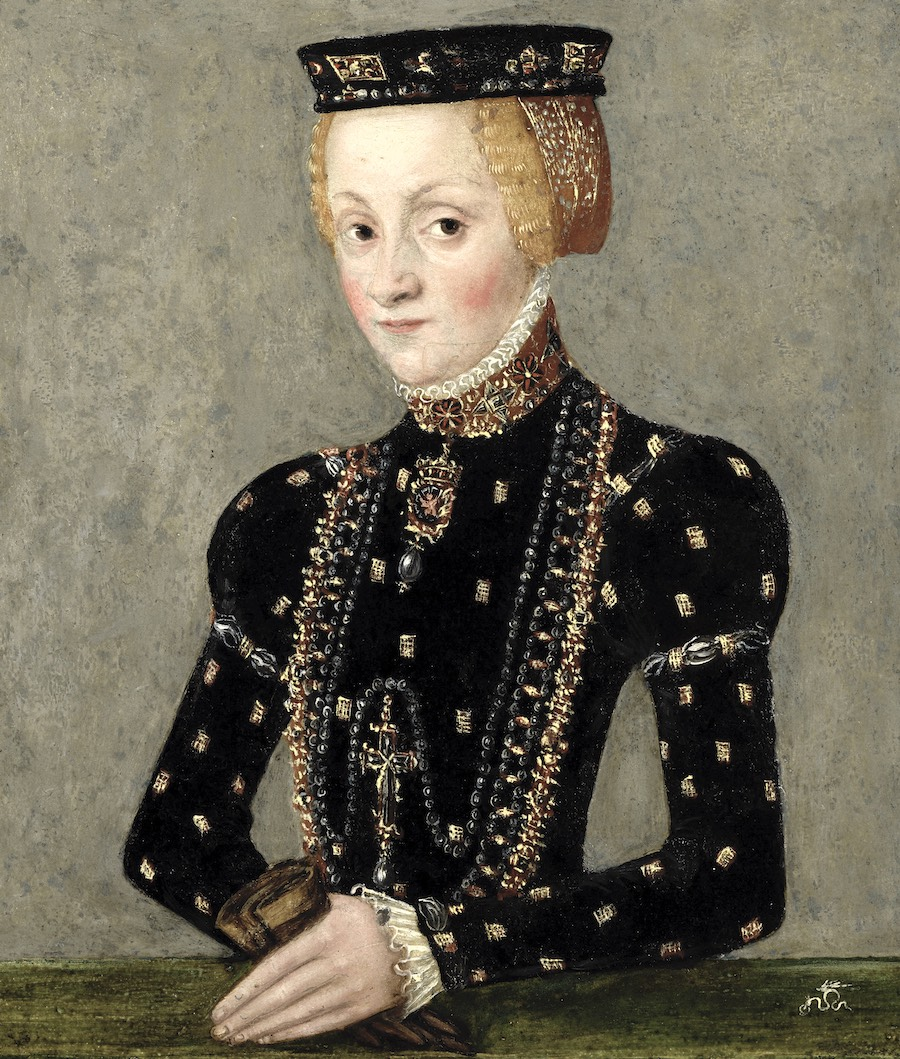
Catherine Jagiellon

- January 1 – Louis Bertrand, Spanish missionary to Latin America, patron saint of Colombia (d. 1581)
- January 20 – Rafael Bombelli, Italian mathematician (d. 1572)
- January 25 – Adolf, Duke of Holstein-Gottorp (d. 1586)
- February 1 – Niiro Tadamoto, Japanese samurai (d. 1611)
- February 2 – Konstanty Wasyl Ostrogski, Polish noble (d. 1608)
- February 19 – Charles de L'Ecluse, Flemish botanist (d. 1609)
- February 23 – Gonçalo da Silveira, Portuguese Jesuit missionary (d. 1561)
- March 4 – Henry Carey, 1st Baron Hunsdon (d. 1596)
- March 11 – Heinrich Rantzau, German humanist writer, astrologer, and astrological writer (d. 1598)
- April 5 – Giuseppe Arcimboldo, Italian painter (d. 1593)
- April 8 – Elisabeth of Brunswick-Calenberg, Countess of Henneberg (d. 1566)
- April 12 – Muretus, French humanist (d. 1585)
- April 29 – Beate Clausdatter Bille, Danish noblewoman (d. 1593)
- June 9 – Matsudaira Hirotada, Japanese daimyō (d. 1549)
- June 25 – Elisabeth Parr, Marchioness of Northampton, English noble (d. 1565)
- July 9 – Elizabeth of Austria, Polish noble (d. 1545)
- July 10 – Philipe de Croÿ, Duke of Aerschot (d. 1595)
- July 31 – Augustus, Elector of Saxony (d. 1586)
- August 18 – Claude, Duke of Aumale (d. 1573)
- August 22 – Adolph of Nassau-Saarbrücken, Count of Nassau (d. 1559)
- September 23 – Henry Manners, 2nd Earl of Rutland (d. 1563)
- September 26 – Wolfgang, Count Palatine of Zweibrücken (d. 1569)
- October 1 – Dorothy Stafford, English noble (d. 1604)
- October 30 – Hubert Goltzius, Dutch Renaissance painter-engraver (d. 1583)
- November 1 – Catherine Jagiellon, queen of John III of Sweden (d. 1583)
- November 12 – Andreas Gaill, German jurist and statesman (d. 1587)
- December 12 – Álvaro de Bazán, 1st Marquis of Santa Cruz, Spanish admiral (d. 1588)
- December 26 – Rose Lok, English businesswoman and Protestant exile during the Tudor period (d. 1613)
- December 28 – Anna Maria of Brandenburg-Ansbach, German princess (d. 1589)
- date unknown
  - Kenau Simonsdochter Hasselaer, Dutch war heroine (d. 1588)
  - Ikoma Chikamasa, Japanese daimyō in the Azuchi-Momoyama and Edo periods (d. 1603)
  - Azai Hisamasa, Japanese warlord (d. 1573)
- probable
  - Taqi ad-Din Muhammad ibn Ma'ruf, Ottoman Muslim scientist (d. 1585)

1527

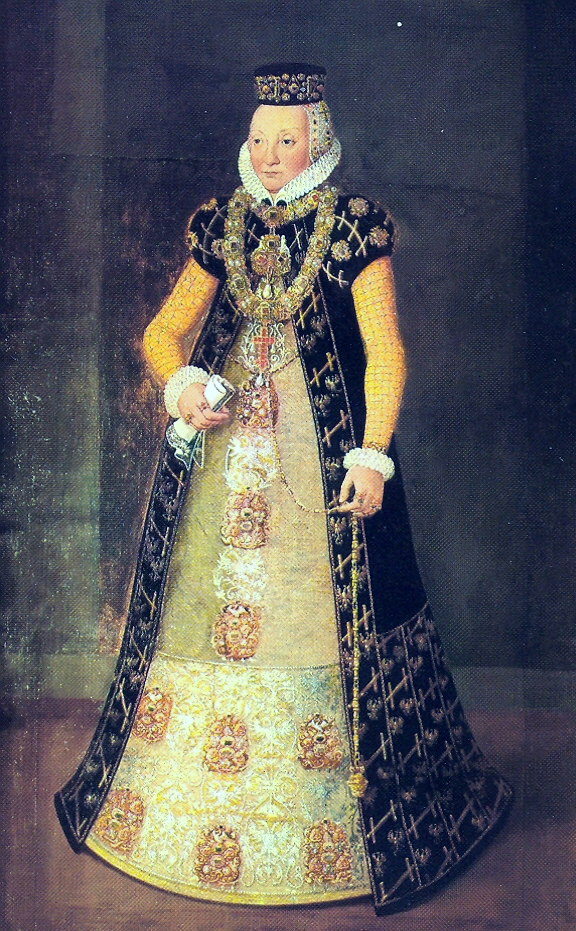
Anna Sophia of Prussia

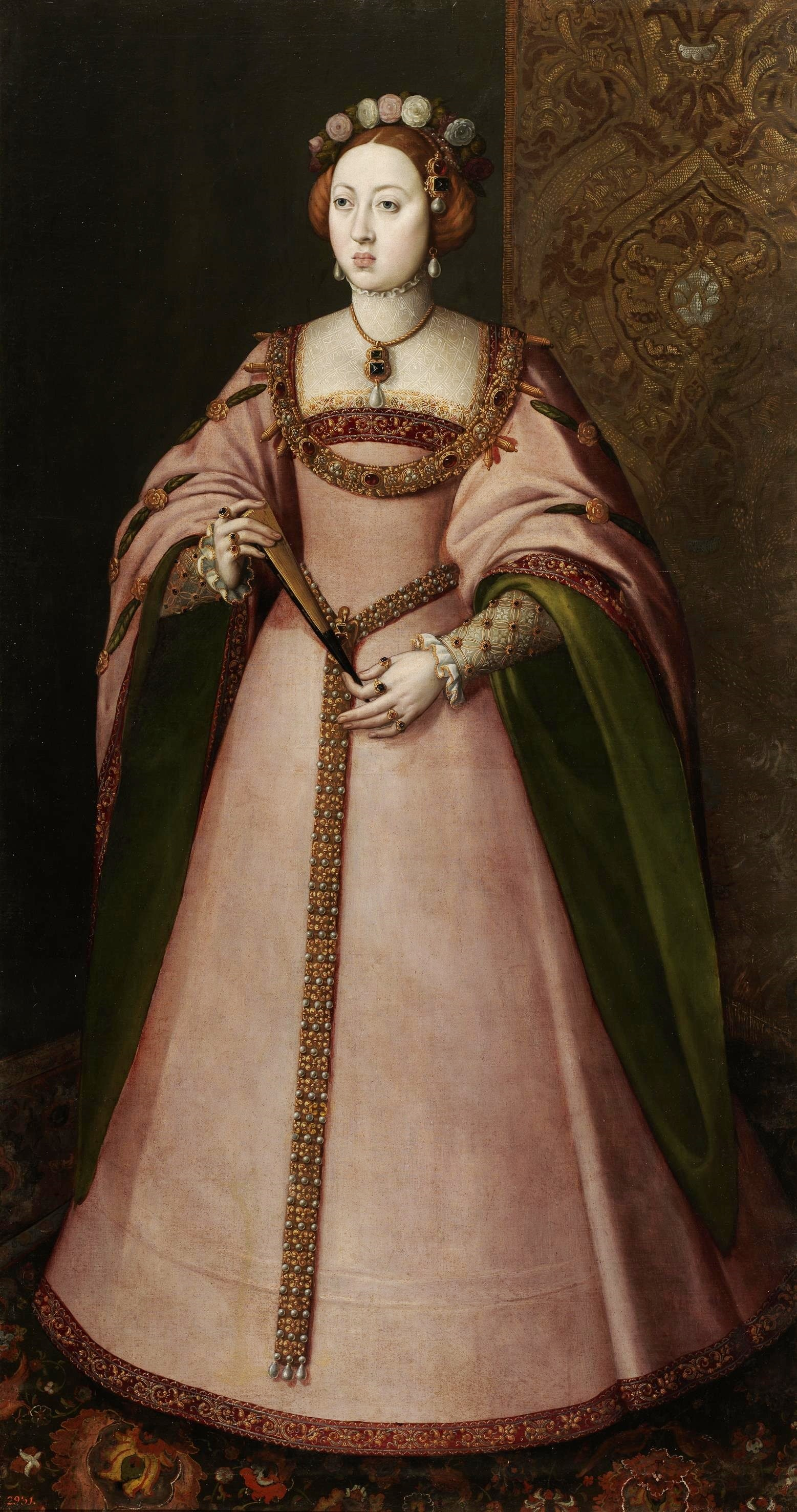
Maria Manuela, Princess of Portugal

- March 4 – Ludwig Lavater, Swiss Reformed theologian (d. 1586)
- March 5 – Ulrich, Duke of Mecklenburg (d. 1603)
- March 10 – Alfonso d'Este, Lord of Montecchio, Italian nobleman (d. 1587)
- March 21 – Hermann Finck, German composer and music theorist (d. 1558)
- March 28 – Isabella Markham, English courtier (d. 1579)
- March 31 – Edward Fitton, the elder, Irish politician (d. 1579)
- April 14 – Abraham Ortelius, Flemish cartographer and geographer (d. 1598)
- c. May 1 – Johannes Stadius, German astronomer, astrologer, mathematician (d. 1579)
- May 21 – Philip II, King of Spain (d. 1598)
- May 31 – Agnes of Hesse, German noble, by marriage, Princess of Saxony (d. 1555)
- June 11 – Anna Sophia of Prussia, Duchess of Prussia and Duchess of Mecklenburg (d. 1591)
- June 24 – Jean Vendeville, French law professor, Roman Catholic bishop (d. 1592)
- July 8 – Saitō Yoshitatsu, Japanese daimyō (d. 1561)
- July 13 – John Dee, English mathematician, astronomer, and geographer (d. 1608)
- July 31 – Maximilian II, Holy Roman Emperor (d. 1576)
- August 10 – Barbara of Brandenburg, Duchess of Brieg, German princess (d. 1595)
- September 29 – John Lesley, Scottish bishop (d. 1596)
- October 2 – William Drury, English politician (d. 1579)
- October 15 – Maria Manuela, Princess of Portugal (d. 1545)
- October 21 – Louis I, Cardinal of Guise, French Catholic cardinal (d. 1578)
- November 1
  - Pedro de Ribadeneira, Spanish hagiologist (d. 1611)
  - William Brooke, 10th Baron Cobham, English noble and politician (d. 1597)
- November 3 – Tilemann Heshusius, Gnesio-Lutheran theologian (d. 1588)
- November 18 – Luca Cambiasi, Italian painter (d. 1585)
- December 6 – Bernhard VIII, Count of Lippe (d. 1563)
- December 23 – Hugues Doneau, French lawyer (d. 1591)
- date unknown
  - Luis de León, Spanish lyric poet and mystic (d. 1591)
  - Annibale Padovano, Italian composer and organist (d. 1575)
- probable
  - John Dudley, 2nd Earl of Warwick, English nobleman (d. 1554)
  - Lawrence Humphrey, English clergyman and educator (d. 1590)

1528

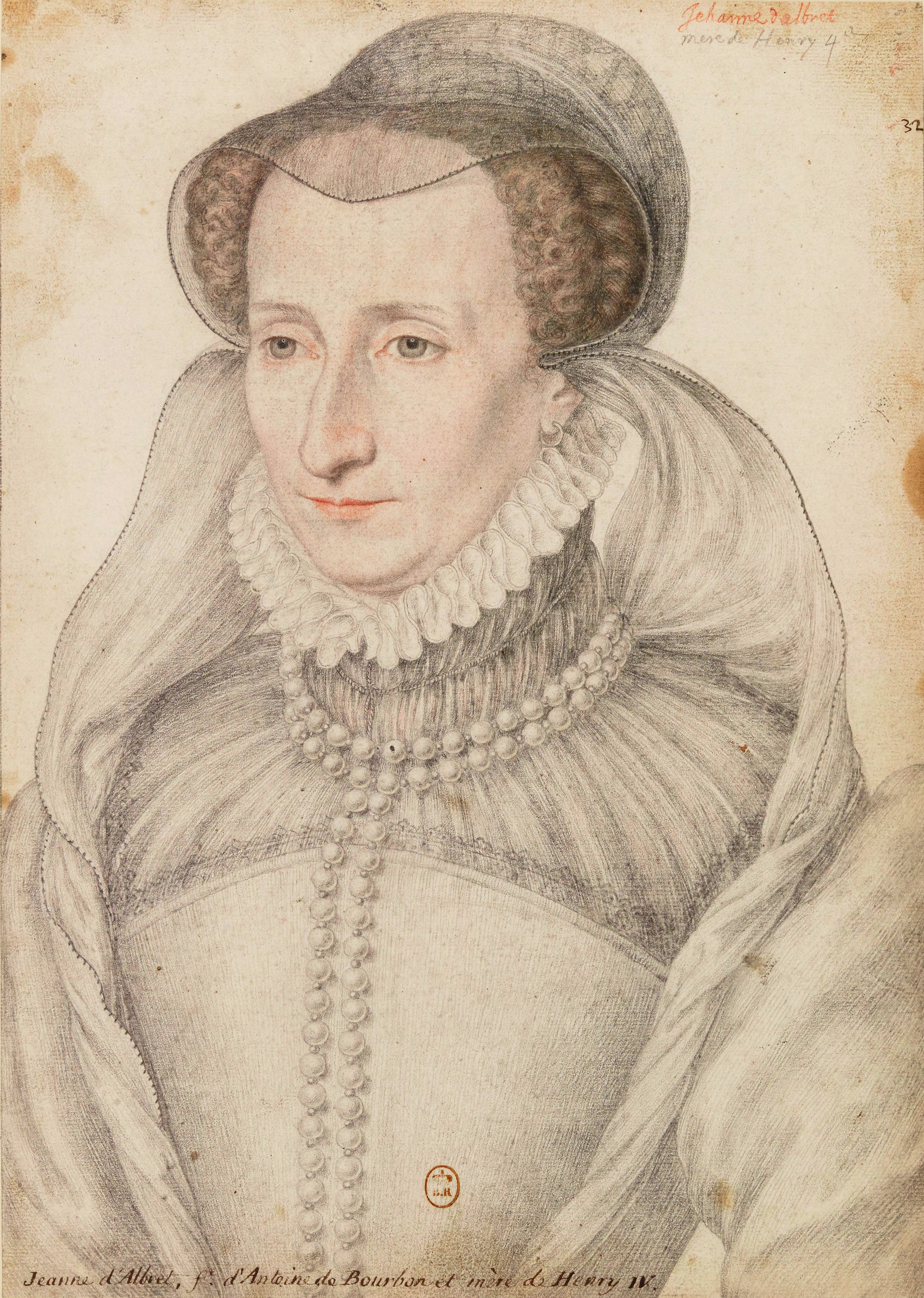
Jeanne III of Navarre

- February 29
  - Domingo Báñez, Spanish theologian (d. 1604)
  - Albert V, Duke of Bavaria (d. 1579)
- March 10 – Akechi Mitsuhide, Japanese samurai and warlord (d. 1582)
- March 25 – Jakob Andreae, German theologian (d. 1590)
- June 7 – Cyriacus Spangenberg, German theologian and historian (d. 1604)
- June 21 – Maria of Austria, Holy Roman Empress (d. 1603)
- June 29 – Julius, Duke of Brunswick-Lüneburg (d. 1589)
- July 7 – Archduchess Anna of Austria, Duchess of Bavaria (d. 1590)
- July 8 – Emmanuel Philibert, Duke of Savoy (d. 1580)
- July 26 – Diego Andrada de Payva, Portuguese theologian (d. 1575)
- August 10 – Eric II, Duke of Brunswick-Lüneburg (d. 1584)
- September 25 – Otto II, Duke of Brunswick-Harburg (d. 1603)
- October 4? – Francisco Guerrero, Spanish composer (d. 1599)
- October 10 – Adam Lonicer, German botanist (d. 1586)
- November 2 – Petrus Lotichius Secundus, German Neo-Latin poet (d. 1560)
- November 6 – Gabriel Goodman, Dean of Westminster (d. 1601)
- November 12 – Qi Jiguang, Chinese military general (d. 1588)
- November 14 – Francisco Pérez de Valenzuela, Spanish noble (d. 1599)
- November 16 – Jeanne d'Albret, Queen of Navarre (d. 1572)
- November 29 – Anthony Browne, 1st Viscount Montagu, English politician (d. 1592)
- date unknown
  - Igram van Achelen, Dutch statesman (d. 1604)
  - Adam von Bodenstein, Swiss alchemist and physician (d. 1577)
  - Jean-Jacques Boissard, French antiquary and Latin poet (d. 1602)
  - Andrey Kurbsky, Russian writer (d. 1583)
  - George Talbot, 6th Earl of Shrewsbury, English statesman (d. 1590)
  - Phùng Khắc Khoan, Vietnamese military strategist, politician, diplomat and poet (d. 1613)
  - Sabina, Duchess of Bavaria (d. 1578)
  - Sakuma Nobumori, Japanese retainer and samurai (d. 1582)
  - Tanegashima Tokitaka, Japanese daimyō (d. 1579)
  - Thomas Whythorne, English musician and author (d. 1595)
- probable
  - Ambrose Dudley, 3rd Earl of Warwick, English general (d. 1590)
  - Paul de Foix, French diplomat (d. 1584)
  - Jean de Ligne, Duke of Arenberg, stadtholder of the Dutch provinces of Friesland (d. 1568)
  - Costanzo Porta, Italian composer (d. 1601)

1529

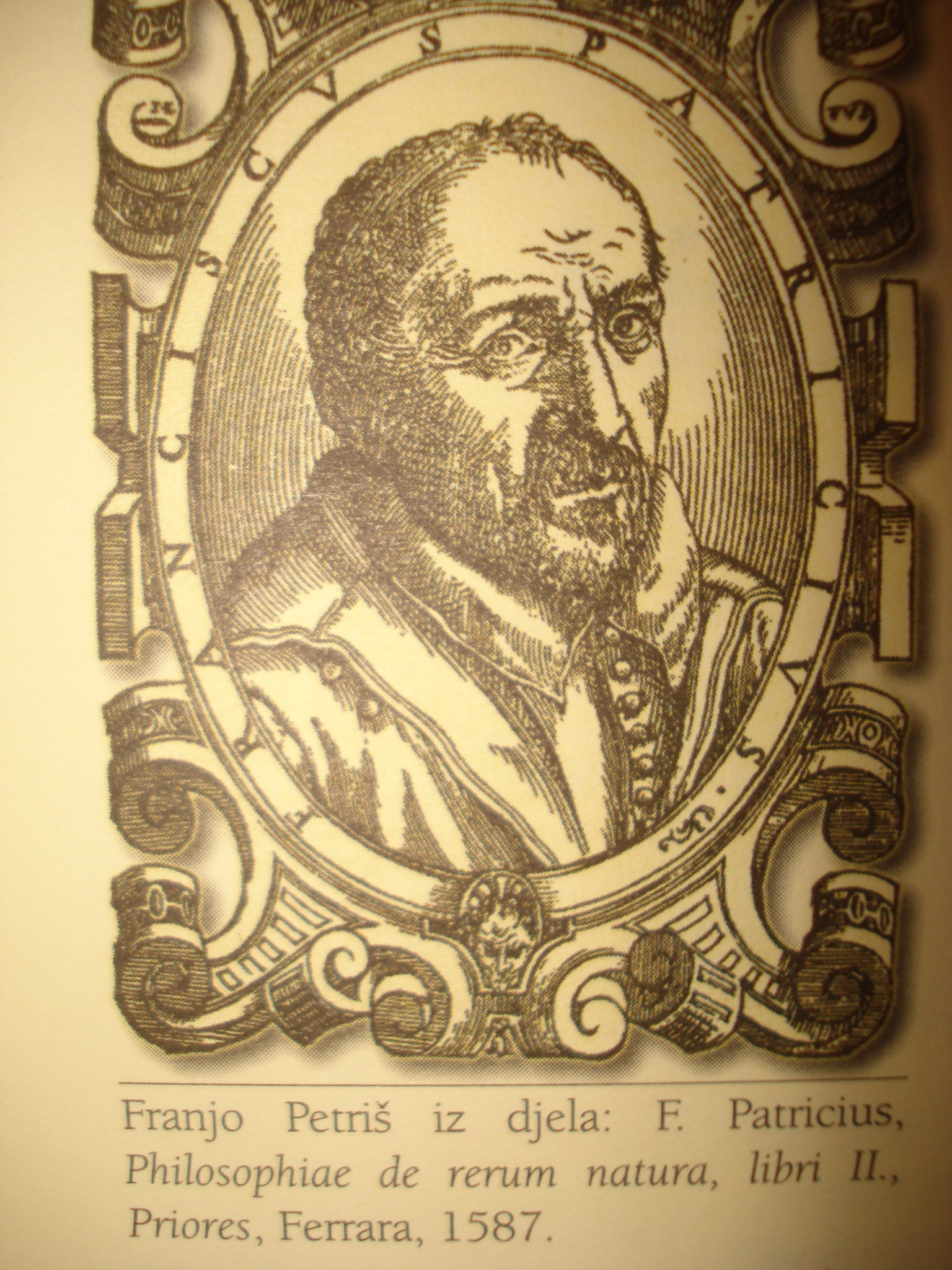
Franciscus Patricius

- January 8 – John Frederick II, Duke of Saxony (d. 1595)
- January 13 – Ebba Månsdotter, Swedish noble (d. 1609)
- February 14 – Markus Fugger, German businessman (d. 1597)
- February 23 – Onofrio Panvinio, Augustinian historian (d. 1568)
- April 3 – Michael Neander, German mathematician and historian (d. 1581)
- April 25 – Francesco Patrizi, Italian philosopher and scientist (d. 1597)
- May 12 – Sabina of Brandenburg-Ansbach, German princess (d. 1575)
- June 7 – Étienne Pasquier, French lawyer, poet and author (d. 1615)
- June 14 – Ferdinand II, Archduke of Austria, regent of Tyrol and Further Austria (d. 1595)
- July 16 – Petrus Peckius the Elder, Dutch jurist, writer on international maritime law (d. 1589)
- July 20 – Henry Sidney, lord deputy of Ireland (d. 1586)
- July 24 – Charles II, Margrave of Baden-Durlach (d. 1577)
- August 10 – Ernst Vögelin, German publisher (d. 1589)
- September 1 – Taddeo Zuccari, Italian painter (d. 1566)
- September 25 – Günther XLI, Count of Schwarzburg-Arnstadt (d. 1583)
- October 26 – Anna of Hesse, Countess Palatine of Zweibrücken (d. 1591)
- December 11 – Fulvio Orsini, Italian humanist historian (d. 1600)
- December 16 – Laurent Joubert, French physician (d. 1582)
- date unknown
  - Titu Cusi, Inca ruler of Vilcabamba (d. 1571)
  - Giambologna, Italian sculptor (d. 1608)
  - Michał Wiśniowiecki, Ruthenian prince at Wiśniowiec (d. 1584)
  - George Puttenham, English critic (d. 1590)

== Deaths ==
1520

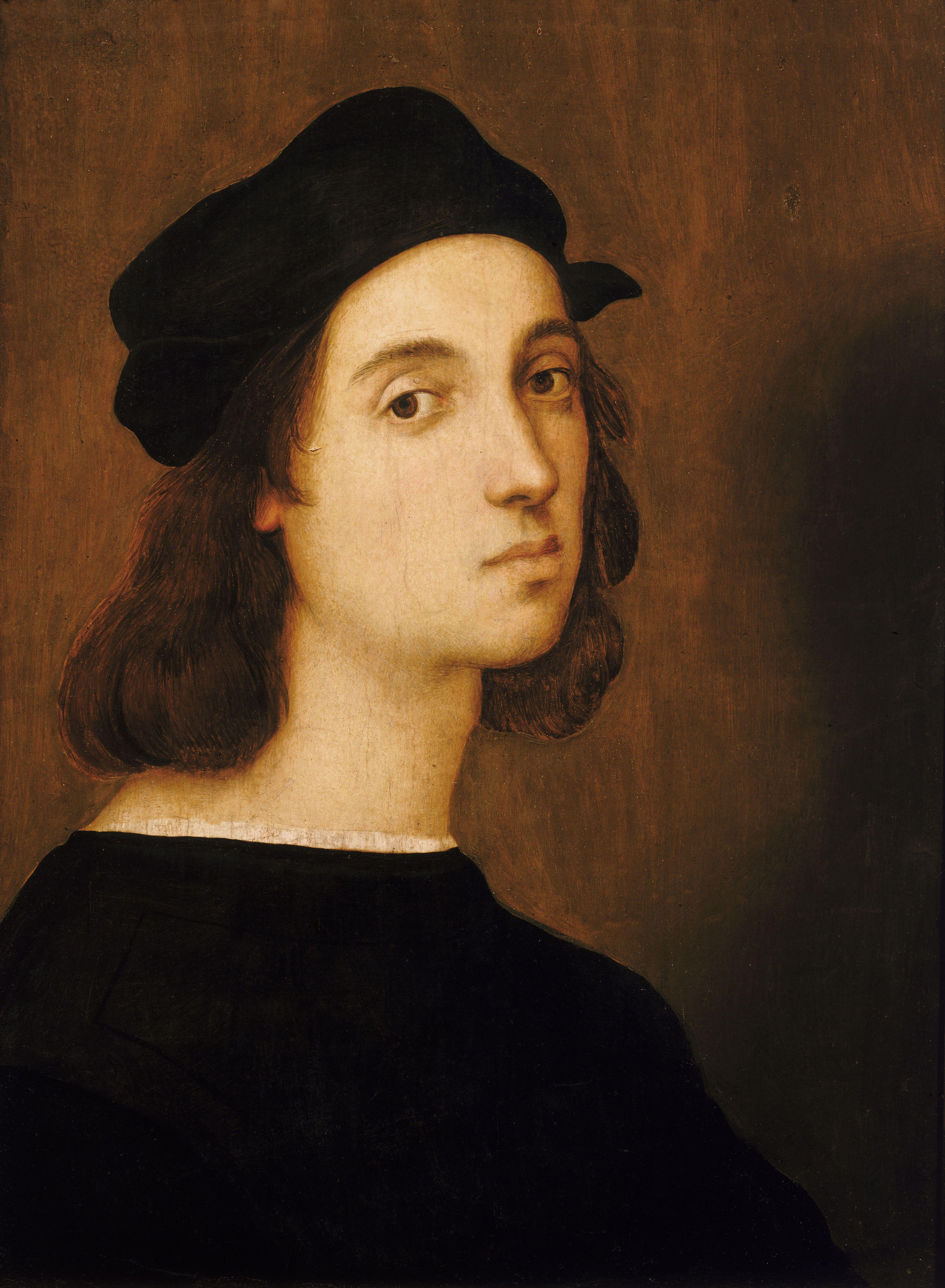
Raphael

- January 10 – Jo Gwang-jo, Korean philosopher (b. 1482)
- February 3 – Sten Sture the Younger, Viceroy of Sweden (b. 1493)
- February 7 – Alfonsina de' Medici, née Orsini, Regent of Florence (b. 1472)
- April 6 – Raphael, Italian painter and architect (b. 1483)
- May 22 – Jan Lubrański, Polish bishop (b. 1456)
- June 24 – Hosokawa Sumimoto, Japanese samurai commander (b. 1489)
- June 29 – Moctezuma II, 9th Tlatoani (emperor) of the Aztecs, assassinated or possibly killed in a riot, 1502-1520 (b. 1466)
- August 6 – Kunigunde of Austria, Archduchess of Austria (b. 1465)
- September 3 – Ippolito d'Este, Italian Catholic cardinal (b. 1479)
- September 22 – Selim I, Ottoman Sultan (b. 1470)
- October – Cuitláhuac, 10th Tlatoani (emperor) of the Aztecs, 1520, brother of Moctezuma II, smallpox (b. c. 1476)
- November 9 – Bernardo Dovizi, Italian Catholic cardinal (b. 1470)
- date unknown
  - Cacamatzin, king of Texcoco (altepetl) (modern Mexico) (b. 1483)
  - Ratna Malla, first Raja of Kantipur
  - Visoun, king of Lan Xang (b. 1465)
  - Sheikh Hamdullah, Ottoman calligrapher (b. 1436)
  - Clara Tott, German court singer (b. 1440)
- probable – Filippo de Lurano, Italian composer (b. 1475)

1521

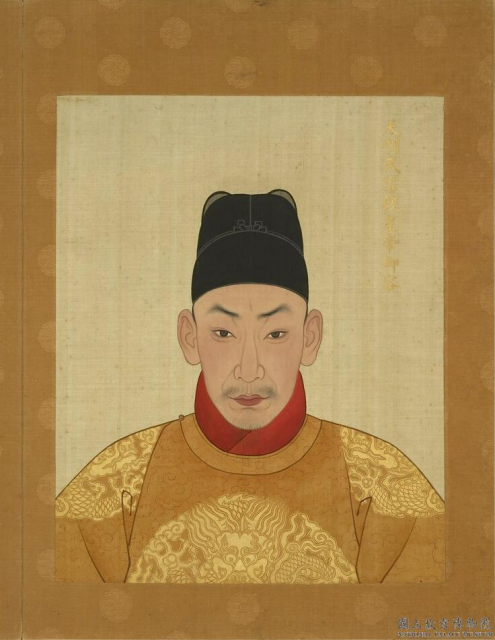
Zhengde Emperor

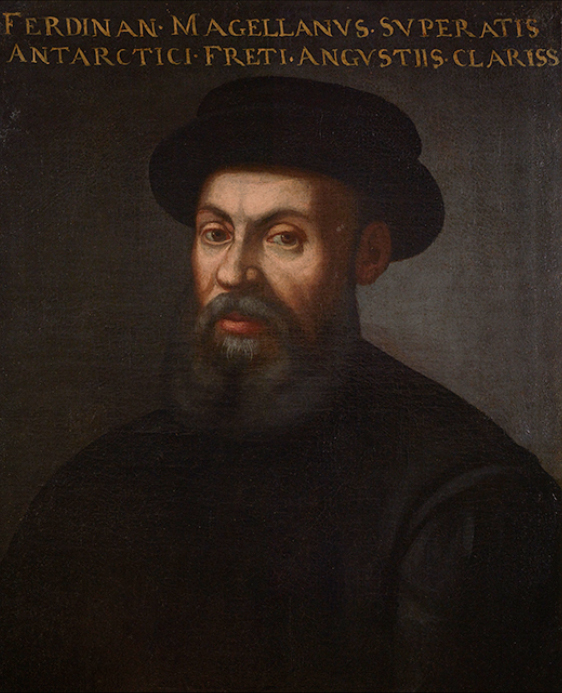
Ferdinand Magellan

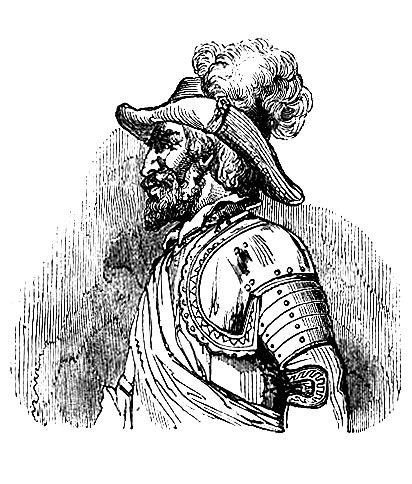
Juan Ponce de León

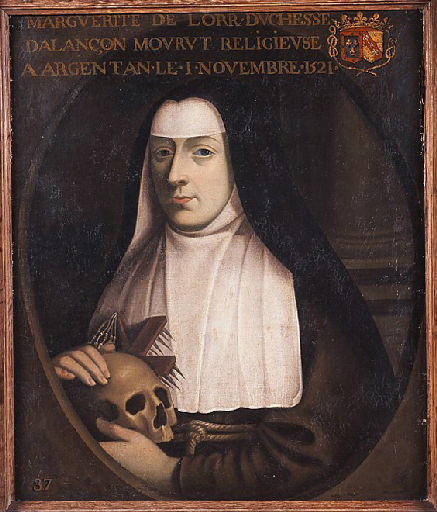
Saint Margaret of Lorraine

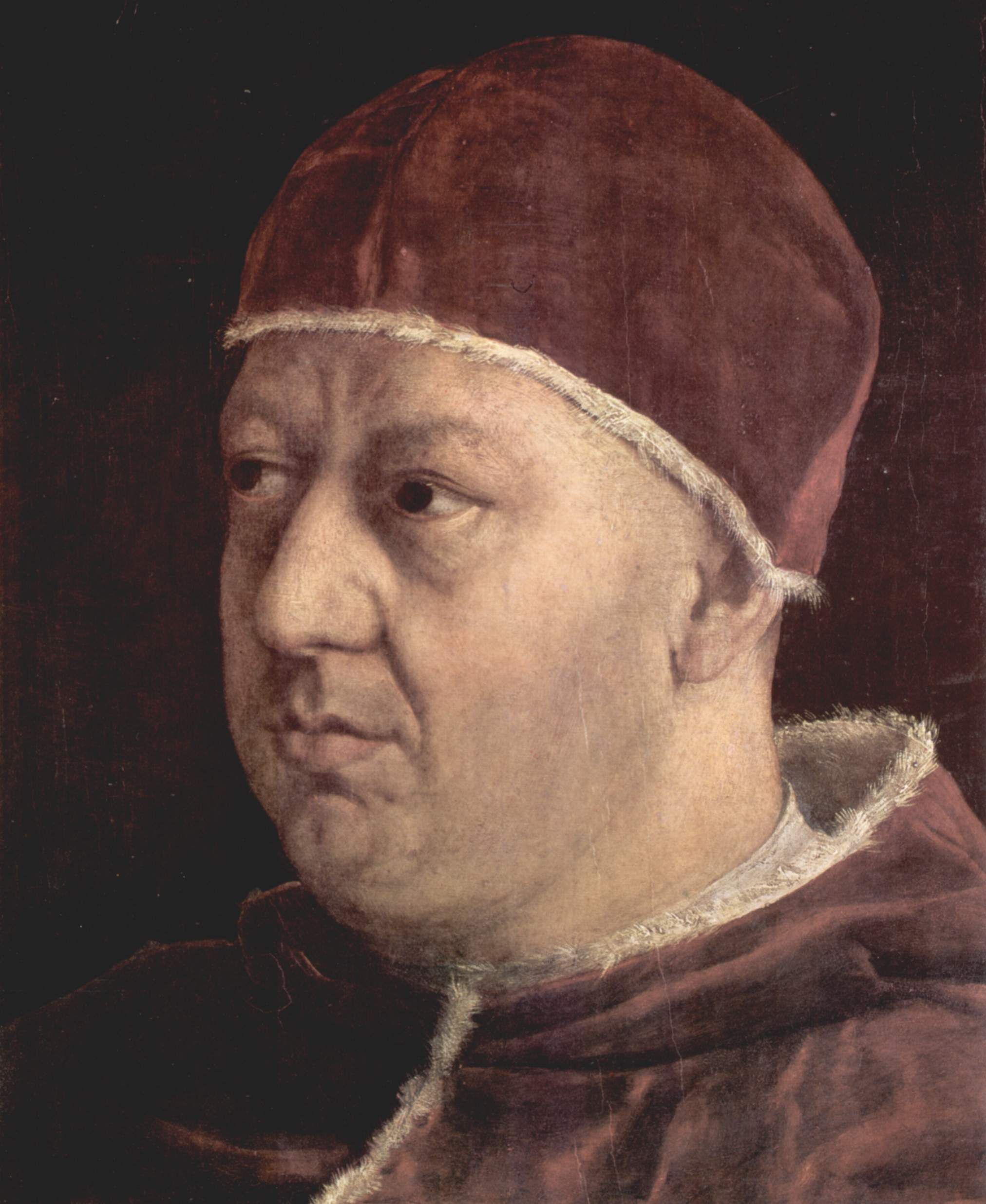
Pope Leo X

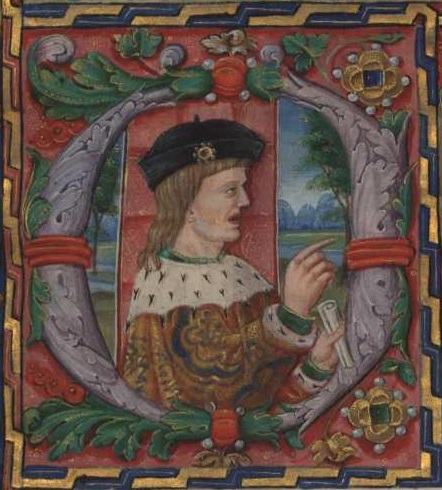
King Manuel I of Portugal

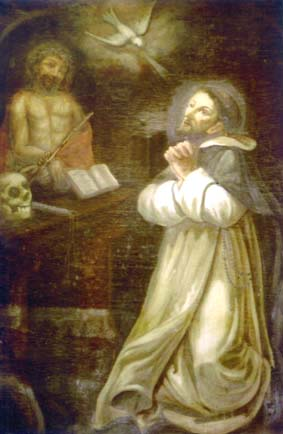
Blessed Domenico Spadafora

- January 6 – Cardinal William de Croÿ (b. 1497)
- January 15 – John II, Duke of Cleves (b. 1458)
- April 20 – Zhengde Emperor of China (b. 1491)
- April 24 – Spanish rebels (executed)
  - Juan López de Padilla
  - Juan Bravo
  - Francisco Maldonado
- April 27 – Ferdinand Magellan, Portuguese explorer (b. 1480)
- April 28 – Suzanne, Duchess of Bourbon (b. 1491)
- May 10 – Sebastian Brant, German humanist and satirist (b. 1457)
- May 17 – Edward Stafford, 3rd Duke of Buckingham (executed) (b. 1478)
- June 15 – Tamás Bakócz, Hungarian Catholic cardinal and statesman (b. 1442)
- June 22 – Leonardo Loredan, Doge of Venice (b. 1436)
- July – Juan Ponce de León, Spanish conquistador (b. 1460)
- July 9 – Raffaele Riario, Italian cardinal (b. 1461)
- August 27 – Josquin des Prez, Flemish composer (b. c. 1450)
- September 12 – In the Italian War, the Holy Roman Empire abandons its siege of the French-controlled city of Parma after 17 days.
- September 15 –
  - Gazi Husrev Bey replaces Bali-beg Jahjapašić as the Ottoman Governor of Bosnia.
  - Teodosie becomes the new Voivode of Wallachia, at the capital, Targoviste, now in Romania.
- October 7 – Margaret of Anhalt-Köthen, Princess of Anhalt by birth, Duchess consort of Saxony (b. 1494)
- October 22 – Edward Poynings, Lord Deputy to King Henry VII of England (b. 1459)
- October 24 – Robert Fayrfax, English Renaissance composer (b. 1464)
- November 2 – Margaret of Lorraine, French Duchess of Alençon, Roman Catholic nun and blessed (b. 1463)
- December 1 – Pope Leo X (b. 1475)
- December 13 – King Manuel I of Portugal (b. 1469)
- December 21 – Domenico Spadafora, Italian Roman Catholic priest and blessed (b. 1450)
1521 in art

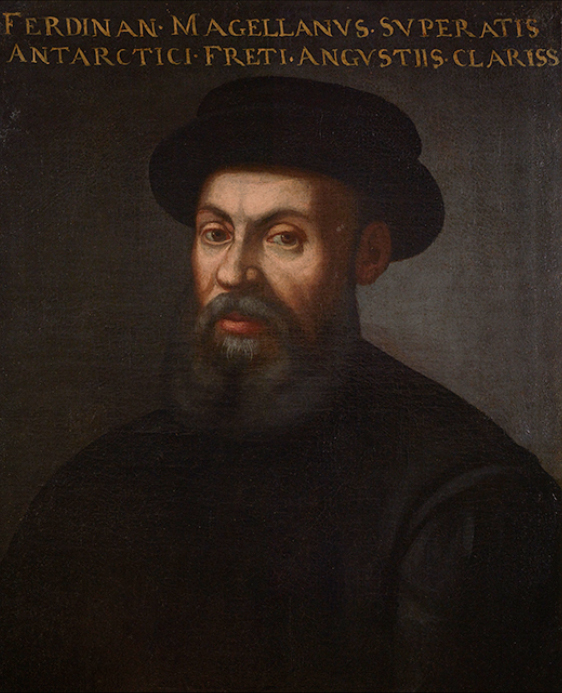
March–April: Ferdinand Magellan's voyage around the world.

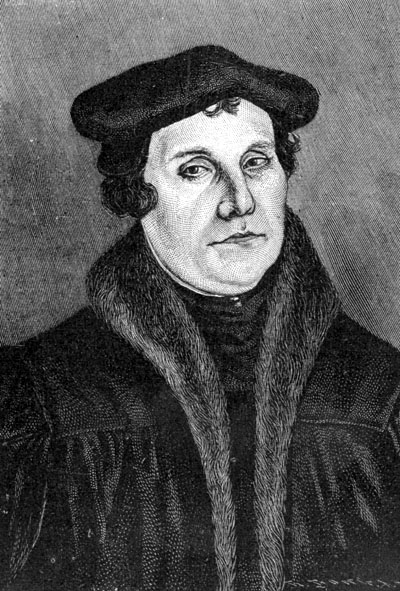
May 25: Martin Luther outlawed.

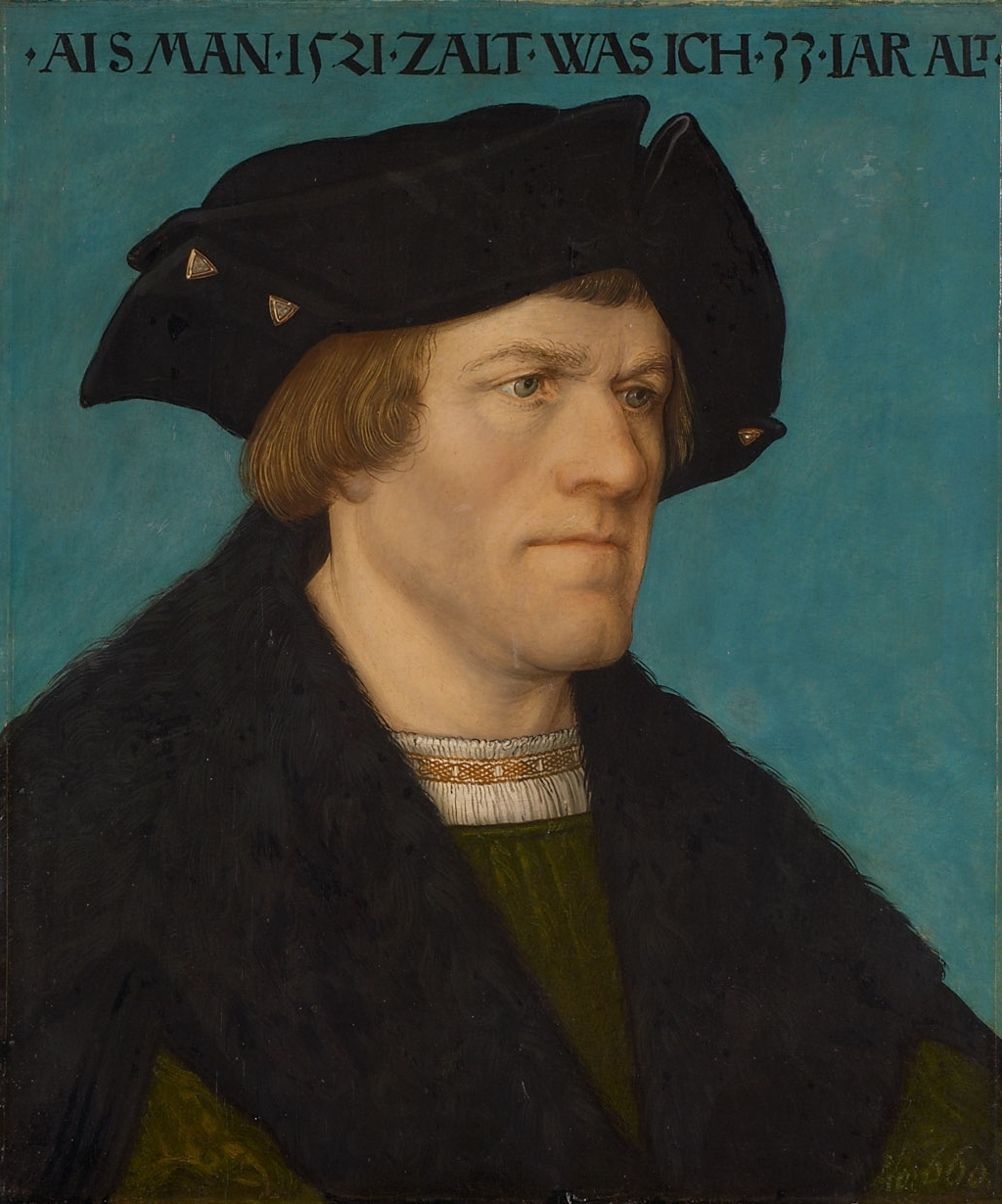
Hans Maler zu Schwaz, Portrait of a beardless man with the inscription:
"ALS MAN. 1521. ZALT. WAS. ICH. 33. IAR ALT"
(mutatis mutandis to English: "as we had in 1521, I was 33 years old)

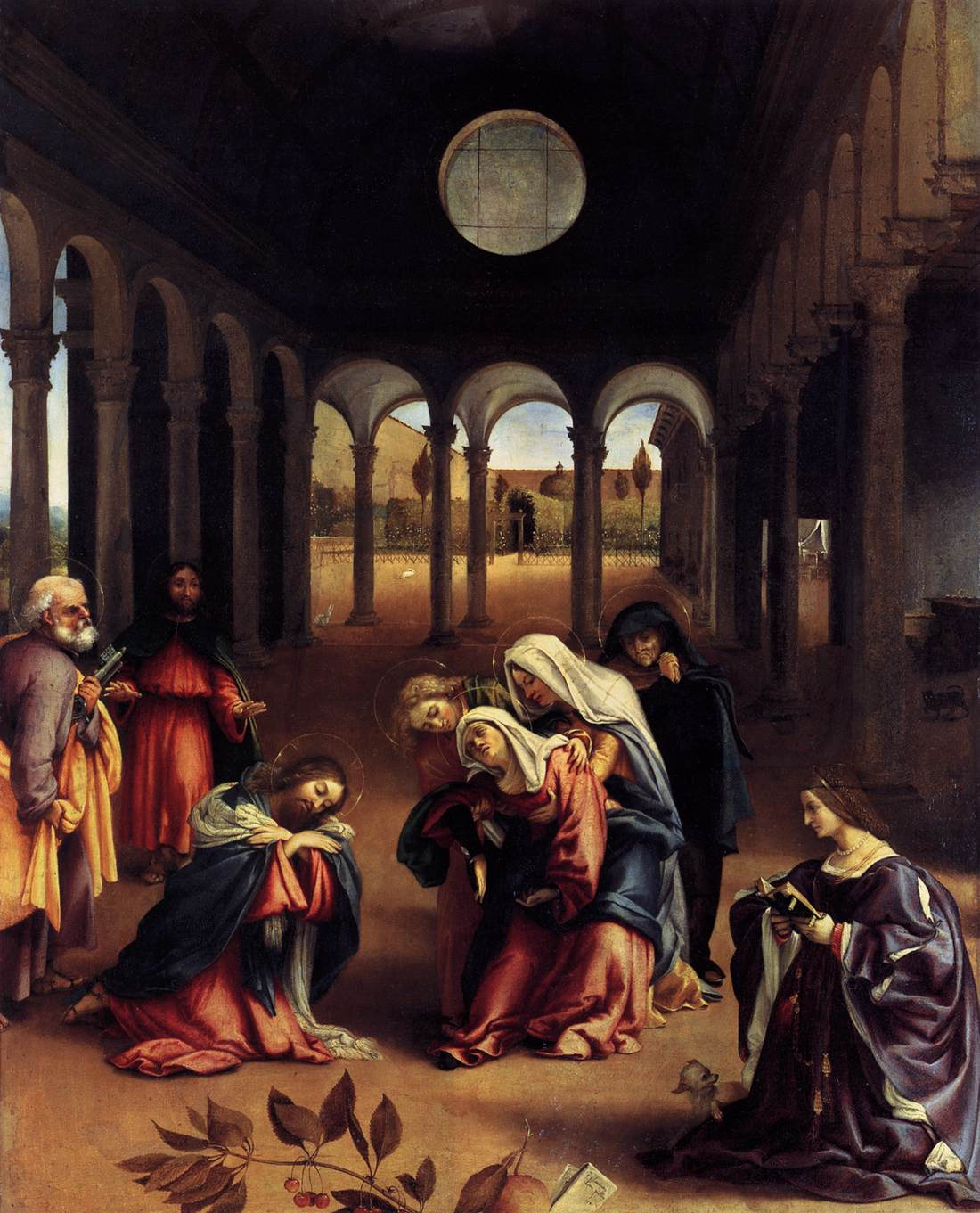
Lorenzo Lotto, Christ Taking Leave of His Mother

1522

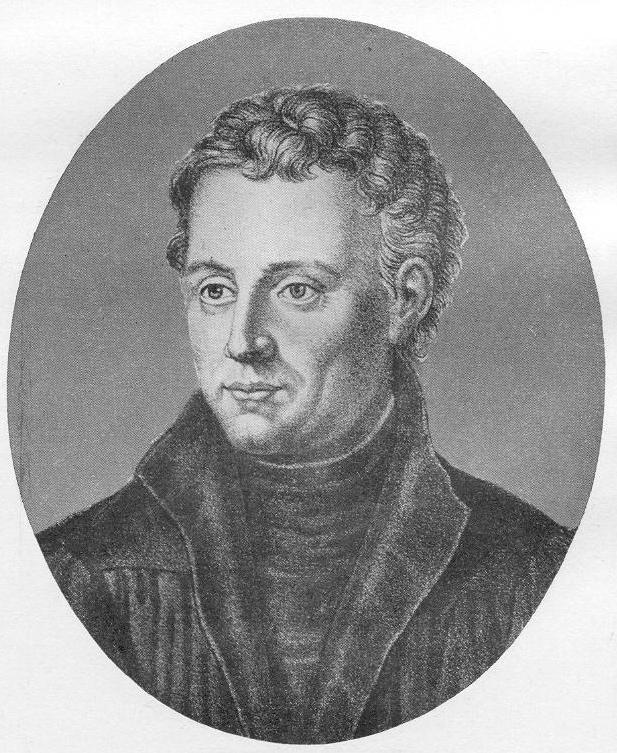
Johann Reuchlin

- January 25 – Raffaello Maffei, Italian theologian (b. 1451)
- January 29 – Wolfgang I of Oettingen, German count (b. 1455)
- February 25 – William Lilye, English classical scholar (b. c. 1468)
- April – Queen Eleni of Ethiopia
- April 10 – Francesco Cattani da Diacceto, Italian philosopher (b. 1466)
- June 13 – Piero Soderini, Florentine statesman (b. 1450)
- June 24 – Elisabeth of the Palatinate, Landgravine of Hesse, German noble (b. 1483)
- June 25 – Franchinus Gaffurius, Italian composer (b. 1451)
- June 30 – Johann Reuchlin, German humanist and Hebrew scholar (b. 1455)
- August 28 – Giovanni Antonio Amadeo, sculptor, engineer and architect
- September – Gavin Douglas, Scottish poet and bishop (b. c. 1474)
- October 30 – Jean Mouton, French composer (b. c. 1459)
- November 14 – Anne of France, Princess and Regent of France (b. 1461)
- date unknown – Fiorenzo di Lorenzo, Italian painter (b. 1440)

1523

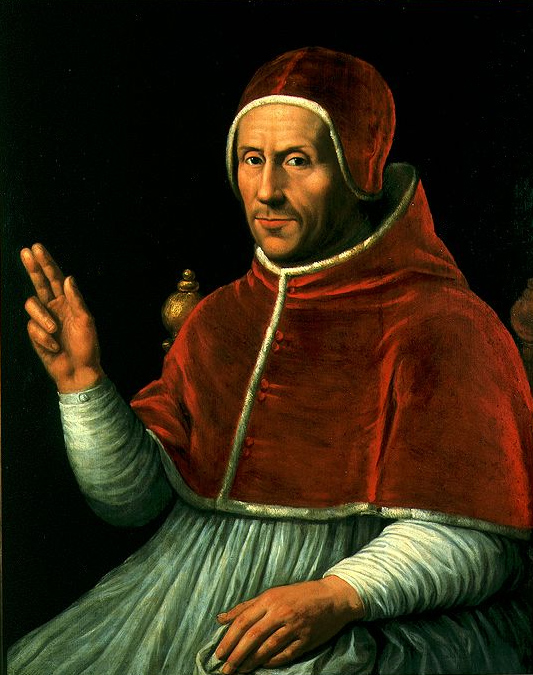
Pope Adrian VI

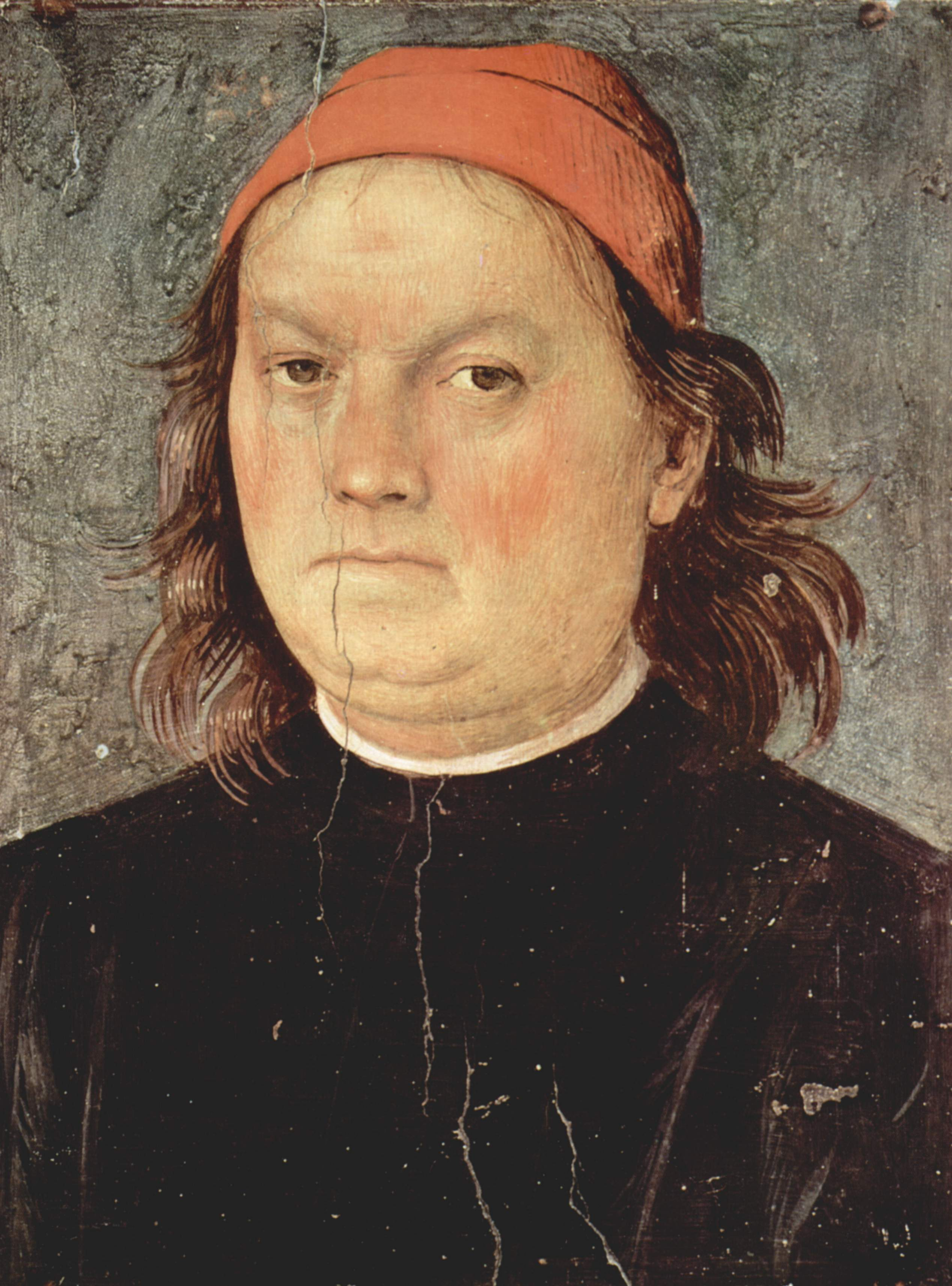
Pietro Perugino

- January 17 – Elisabeth of Hesse-Marburg, German landgravine (b. 1466)
- February 4 – Thomas Ruthall, English chancellor of the University of Cambridge
- March 28 – Louis I, Count of Löwenstein, founder of the House of Löwenstein-Wertheim (b. 1463)
- April 6 – Henry Stafford, 1st Earl of Wiltshire, English nobleman (b. 1479)
- May 7
  - Antonio Grimani, Italian admiral and Doge of Venice (b. 1434)
  - Franz von Sickingen, German knight (b. 1481)
- May 23 – Ashikaga Yoshitane, Japanese shōgun (b. 1466)
- May 24 – Henry Marney, 1st Baron Marney, English politician (b. 1447)
- July 1 – Jan van Essen and Hendrik Vos, Flemish Lutheran martyrs
- July 7 – Wijerd Jelckama, Frisian rebel and warlord (b. 1490)
- August 13 – Gerard David, Flemish artist (b. c. 1455)
- August 27 – Domenico Grimani, Italian nobleman (b. 1461)
- August 29 – Ulrich von Hutten, Lutheran reformer (b. 1488)
- September 14 – Pope Adrian VI (b. 1459)
- October 2 – Alessandro Alessandri, Italian jurist (b. 1461)
- October 5 – Bogislaw X, Duke of Pomerania (1474–1523) (b. 1454)
- October 11 – Bartolomeo Montagna, Italian painter (b. 1450)
- October – William Cornysh, English composer (b. 1465)
- November 10 – Lachlan Cattanach Maclean, 11th Chief, Scottish clan chief (b. 1465)
- date unknown – Pietro Perugino, Italian painter (b. 1446)

1524

- January 5 – Marko Marulić, Croatian poet (b. 1450)
- January 6 – Amalie of the Palatinate, duchess consort of Pomerania (b. 1490)
- February 10 – Catherine of Saxony, Archduchess of Austria (b. 1468)
- February 11 – Isabella of Aragon, Duchess of Milan, daughter of King Alfonso II of Naples (b. 1470)
- February 20 – Tecun Uman, Kʼicheʼ Mayan ruler (b. c. 1500)
- March 28
  - Elisabeth of Brandenburg, Duchess of Württemberg (b. 1451)
  - Ingrid Persdotter, Swedish nun and letter writer
- April 14 – William Conyers, 1st Baron Conyers, English baron (b. 1468)
- April 30 – Pierre Terrail, seigneur de Bayard, French soldier (b. 1473)
- May 17 – Francesco Soderini, Italian Catholic cardinal (b. 1453)
- May 21 – Thomas Howard, 2nd Duke of Norfolk, English soldier and statesman (b. 1443)
- May 23 – Ismail I, Safavid dynasty Shah of Persia (b. 1487)
- May 31 – Camilla Battista da Varano, Italian Roman Catholic nun and saint (b. 1458)
- June 12 – Diego Velázquez de Cuéllar, Spanish conquistador (b. 1465)
- July 9 – Sibylle of Brandenburg, Duchess of Jülich and Berg (b. 1467)
- July 20 – Claude of France, queen consort of Francis I of France (b. 1499)
- August 4 – Helen of the Palatinate, Duchess of Pomerania (b. 1493)
- August 24 – Sir William Scott, English Lord Warden of the Cinque Ports (b. 1459)
- September 18 – Charlotte of Valois, French princess (b. 1516)
- October 5 – Joachim Patinir, Flemish landscape painter (b. c. 1480)
- October 20 – Thomas Linacre, English humanist and physician (b. 1460)
- October 26 – Philip II, Count of Waldeck-Eisenberg (1486–1524) (b. 1453)
- November 12 – Juan Rodríguez de Fonseca, Spanish archbishop and courtier (b. 1451)
- December 24 – Vasco da Gama, Portuguese explorer (b. c. 1469)
- date unknown
  - Hans Holbein the Elder, German painter (b. 1460)
  - Andrea Solari, Italian painter (b. 1460)
  - Tang Yin, Chinese painter (b. 1470)

1525

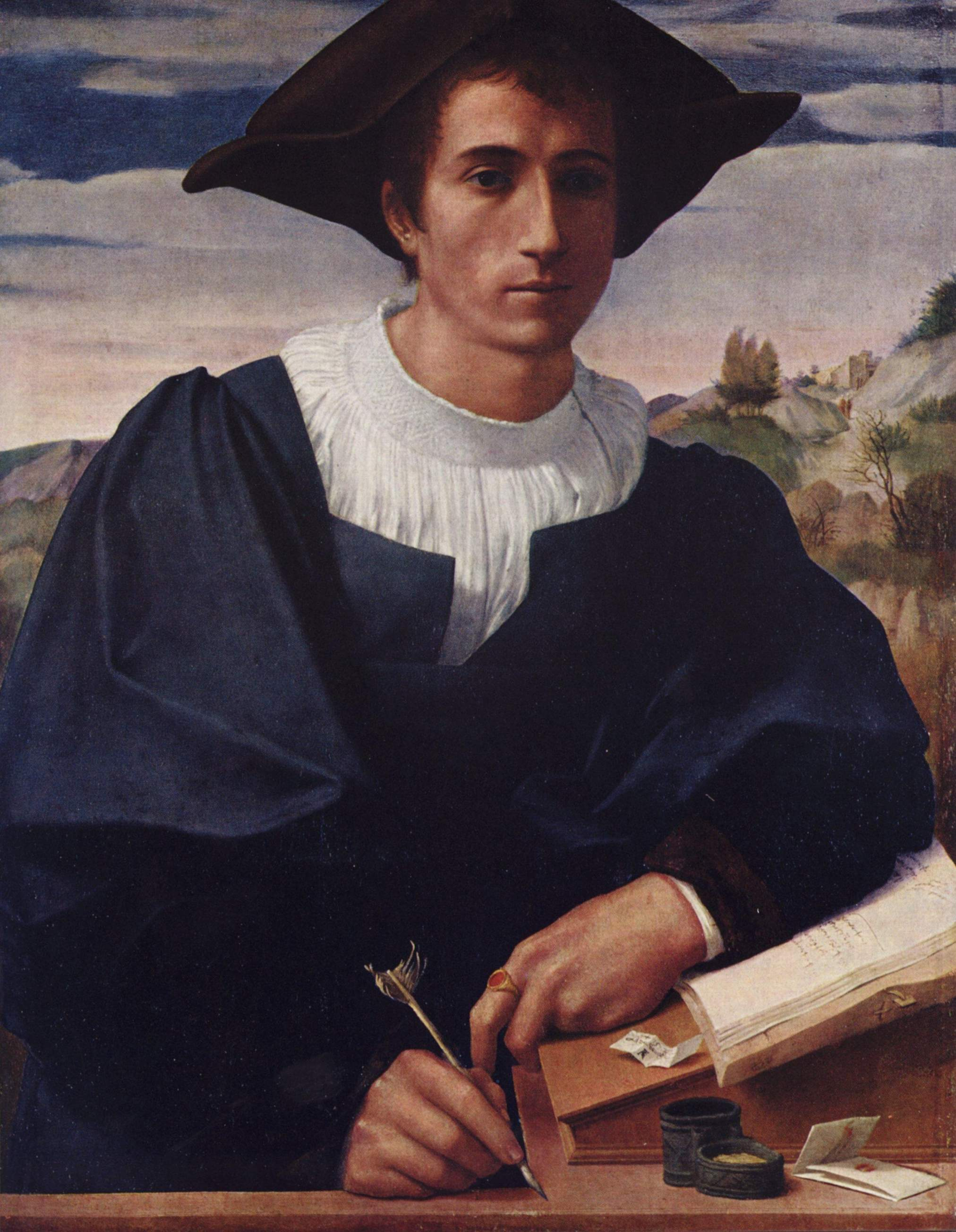
Franciabigio

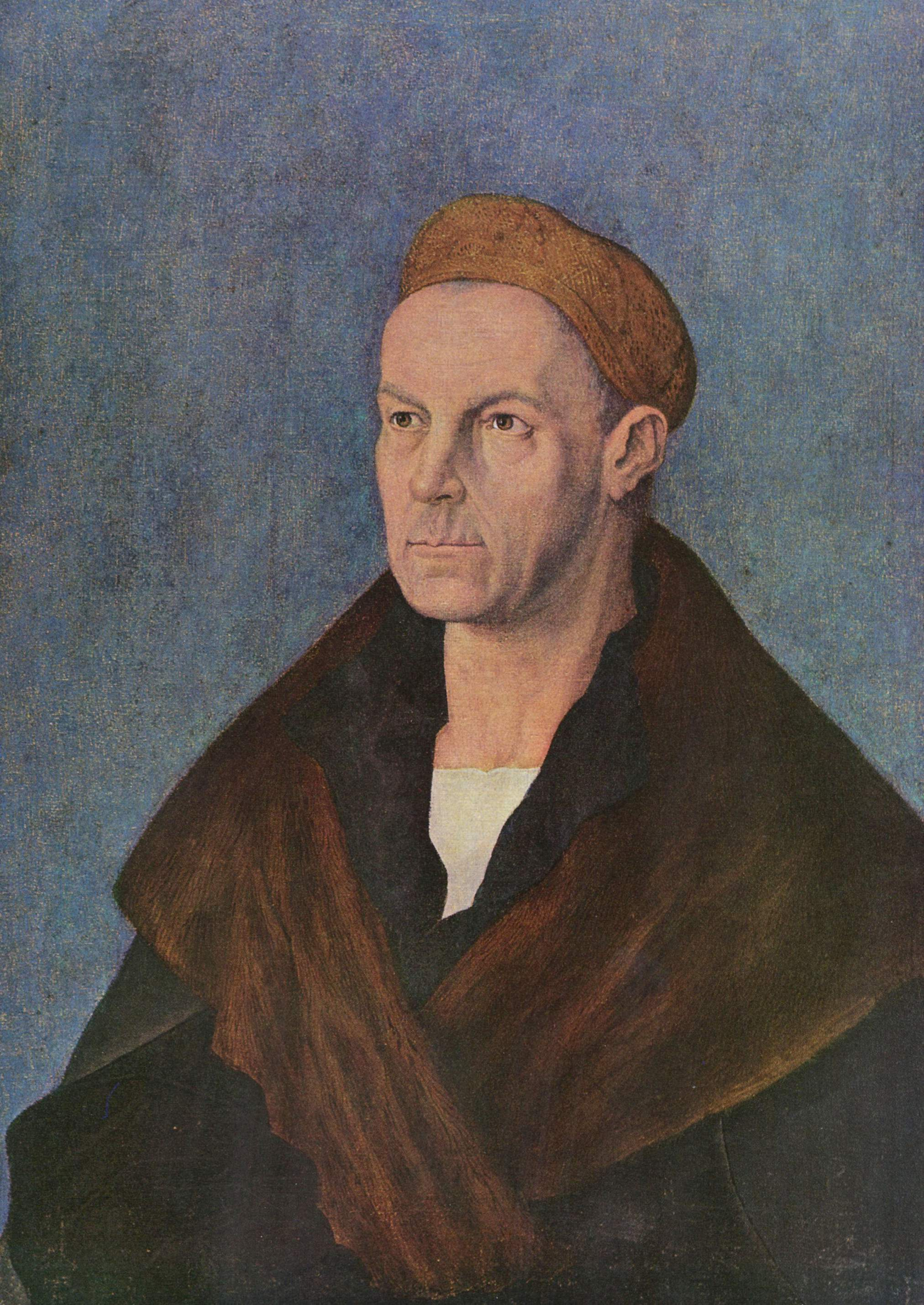
Jakob Fugger

- January 14 – Franciabigio, Florentine painter (b. 1482)
- February 24 (in action at the Battle of Pavia)
  - Guillaume Gouffier, seigneur de Bonnivet, French soldier (b. c. 1488)
  - Jacques de La Palice, French nobleman and military officer (b. 1470)
  - Richard de la Pole, last Yorkist claimant to the English throne (b. 1480)
  - Louis II de la Trémoille, French military leader (b. 1460)
  - Bartolomeo Fanfulla, Italian mercenary (b. 1477)
  - René de Brosse, French noble
- February 28 – Cuauhtémoc, last Tlatoani of the Aztec Empire (b. c. 1495)
- April 2 or April 3 – Giovanni di Bernardo Rucellai, Italian Renaissance man of letters (b. 1475)
- May 5 – Frederick III, Elector of Saxony (b. 1463)
- May 12 – Anna of Mecklenburg-Schwerin, Mecklenburgian royal (b. 1485)
- May 18 – Pietro Pomponazzi, Italian philosopher (b. 1462)
- May 27 – Thomas Müntzer, German pastor and rebel leader (b. 1489) (executed)
- July 5 – Johann of Brandenburg-Ansbach, Viceroy of Valencia, German noble (b. 1493)
- July 22 – Richard Wingfield, English diplomat (b. c. 1456)
- August 4 – Andrea della Robbia, Italian artist (b. 1435)
- October 24 – Thomas Dacre, 2nd Baron Dacre, Knight of Henry VIII of England (b. 1467)
- November 17 – Eleanor of Viseu, queen of João II of Portugal (b. 1458)
- December 30 – Jakob Fugger, German banker (b. 1459)
- probable
  - Jean Lemaire de Belges, Walloon poet and historian (b. 1473)
  - Anna Bielke, Swedish noble and commander (b. 1490)

1526

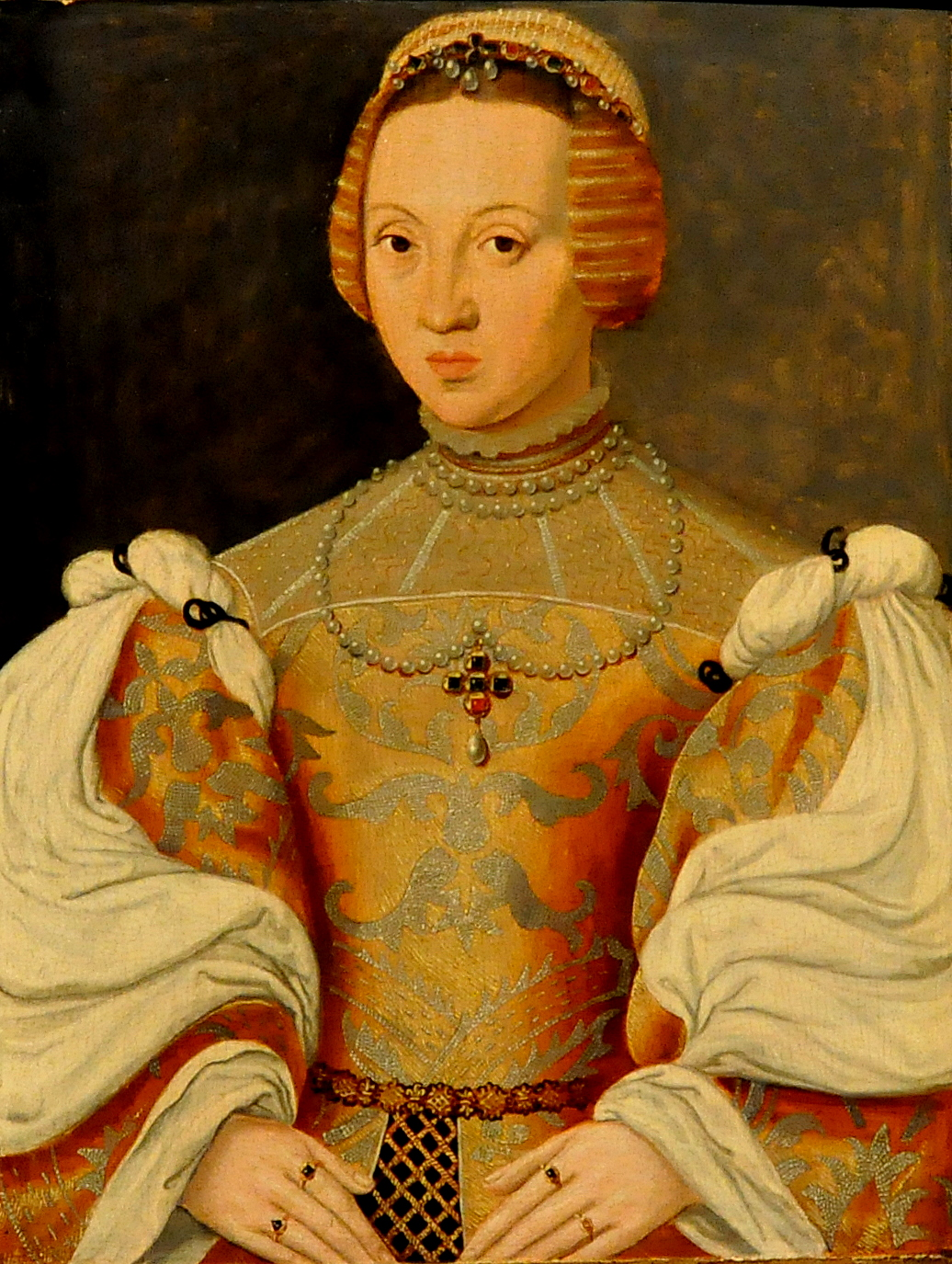
Isabella of Austria

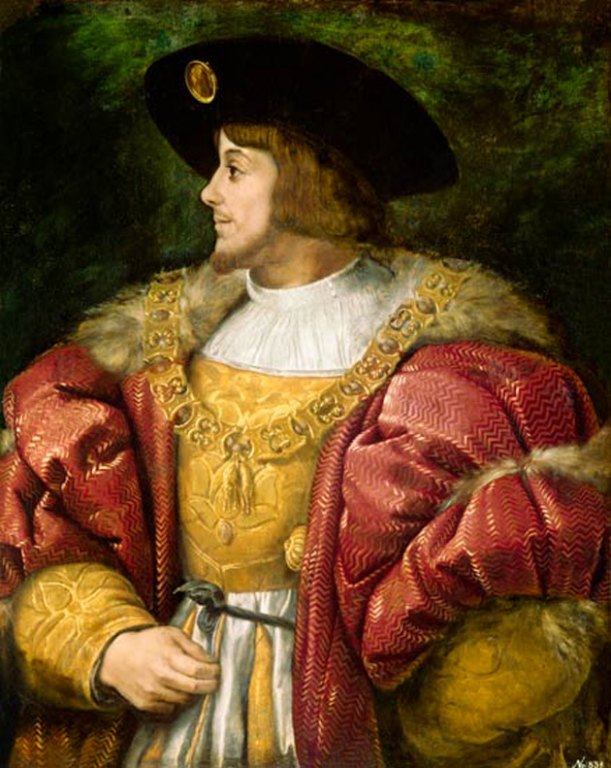
Louis II of Hungary and Bohemia

- January 16 – Catherine of the Palatinate, Abbess of Neuburg am Neckar (b. 1499)
- January 19 – Isabella of Burgundy, queen of Christian II of Denmark (b. 1501)
- February 23 – Diego Colón, Spanish Viceroy of the Indies (b. c. 1479)
- March 24 – Adolph II, Prince of Anhalt-Köthen, German prince (b. 1458)
- March 30 – Konrad Mutian, German humanist (b. 1471)
- April 21 – Ibrahim Lodi, last Sultan of Delhi (in battle)
- April 25 – Charles Somerset, 1st Earl of Worcester (b. 1460)
- May 19 – Emperor Go-Kashiwabara of Japan (b. 1464)
- June 4 – Francisco Fernández de la Cueva, 2nd Duke of Alburquerque, Spanish duke (b. 1467)
- July 14 – John de Vere, 14th Earl of Oxford, English noble (b. 1499)
- July 30 – García Jofre de Loaísa, Spanish explorer (b. 1490)
- August 4 – Juan Sebastián Elcano, Spanish explorer (b. 1476)
- August 29 – King Louis II of Hungary and Bohemia (in battle) (b. 1506)
- September 5 – Alonso de Salazar, Spanish explorer
- October 18 – Lucas Vázquez de Ayllón, Spanish explorer (b. 1480)
- November 5 – Scipione del Ferro, Italian mathematician (b. 1465)
- November 30 – Giovanni dalle Bande Nere, Italian condottiero (b. 1498)
- December 12 – Le Chieu Tong, Emperor of Đại Việt, was killed by Mạc Đăng Dung (b. 1506)
- Abu Bakr ibn Muhammad, sultan of Adal (assassinated)
- Francisco Hernández de Córdoba, founder of the Spanish colony of Nicaragua (b. c. 1475)
- Ingerd Erlendsdotter, noblewoman and landowner
- Binnya Ran II, Burmese king of Hanthawaddy (b. 1469)
- Conrad Grebel, co-founder of the Anabaptist movement (b. 1498)

1527

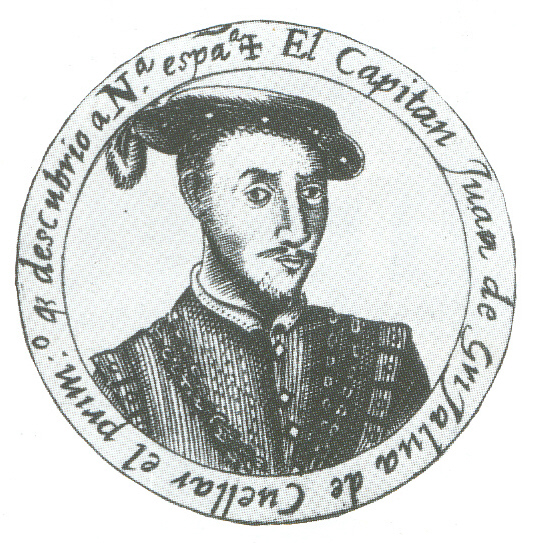
Juan de Grijalva

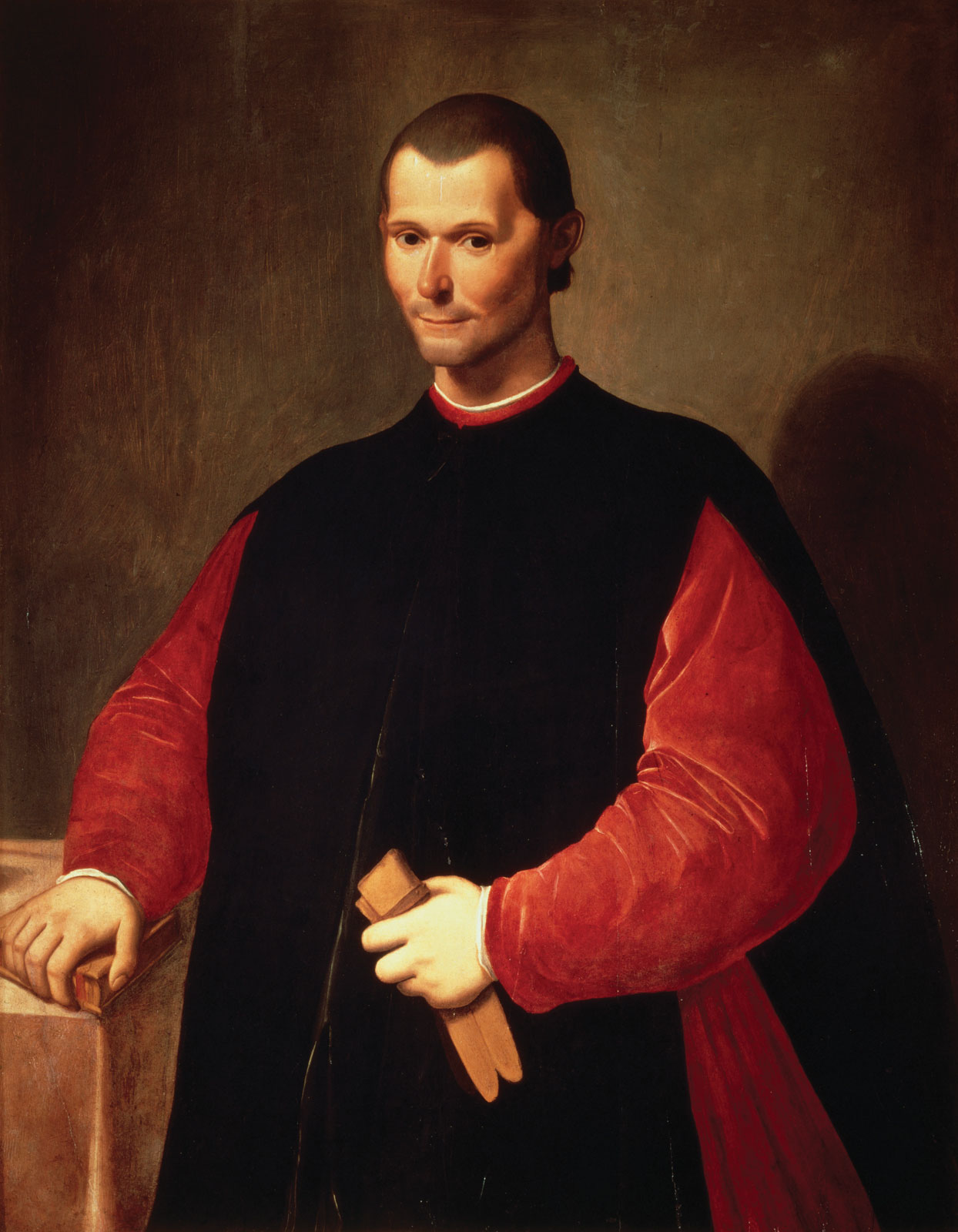
Niccolò Machiavelli

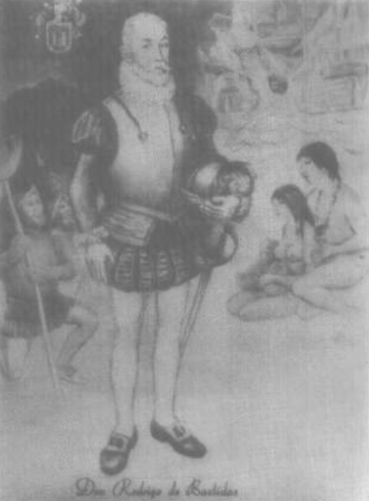
Rodrigo de Bastidas

- January 5 – Felix Manz, leader of the Swiss Anabaptists (executed) (b. 1498)
- January 21 – Juan de Grijalva, Spanish conqueror (b. 1489)
- March 14 – Shwenankyawshin, Burmese king of Ava (b. 1476)
- March 17 – Rana Sanga, Indian ruler (b. 1484)
- April 19
  - Christoph I, Margrave of Baden-Baden (b. 1453)
  - Henry Percy, 5th Earl of Northumberland (b. 1477)
- April/May – Sir Thomas Docwra, English Grand Prior of the Knights Hospitaller (b. 1458)
- May 6 – Charles III, Duke of Bourbon, Count of Montpensier and Dauphin of Auvergne (b. 1490)
- June 21 – Niccolò Machiavelli, Italian writer and statesman (b. 1469)
- June 28 – Bernardo de' Rossi, Italian bishop (b. 1468)
- July 28 – Rodrigo de Bastidas, Spanish conqueror and explorer (b. c. 1460)
- July 31 – Anna Swenonis, Swedish manuscript illuminator
- August 16 – Leonhard Kaiser, German Lutheran theologian and reformer (executed) (b. c. 1480)
- September 21 – Casimir, Margrave of Brandenburg-Kulmbach, Margrave of Bayreuth (b. 1481)
- October 27 – Johann Froben, Swiss printer and publisher (b. c. 1460)
- November 15 – Catherine of York, English princess (b. 1479)
- November 8 – Jerome Emser, German theologian (b. 1477)
- date unknown
  - Francesco Colonna, Italian Dominican priest (b. 1433)
  - Luisa de Medrano, Spanish scholar (b. 1484)
  - Div Sultan Rumlu, Persian military leader
  - Petrus Thaborita, Frisian historian and monk (b. c. 1450)
  - Cristoforo Solari, Italian sculptor and architect (b. c. 1460)
  - Jan "Ciężki" Tarnowski, Polish nobleman (b. c. 1479)
  - Huayna Capac, Sapa Inca of the Inca Empire (b. 1493)
  - Ludovico Vicentino degli Arrighi, Italian calligrapher and type designer (b. 1475)
- probable – Jane Shore, mistress of King Edward IV of England

1528

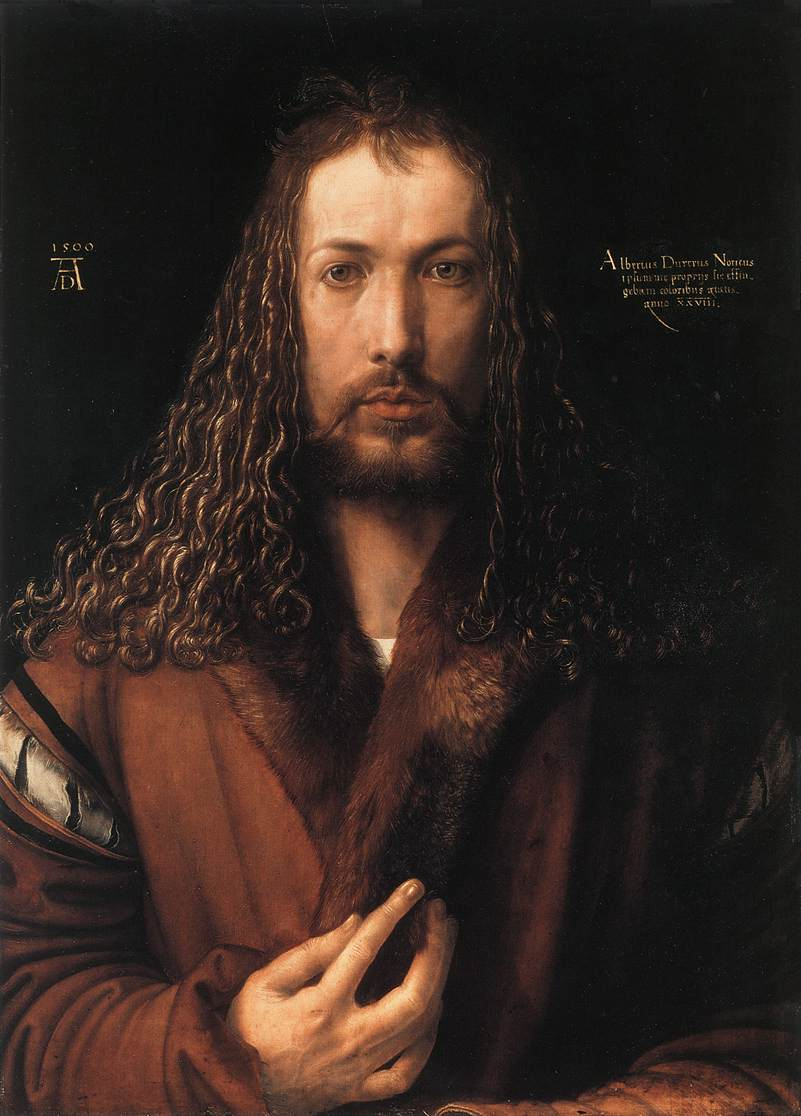
Albrecht Dürer

- January 30 – Maharana Sangram Singh, Rana of Mewar (b. 1484)
- February 29 – Patrick Hamilton, Scottish religious reformer (martyred) (b. 1504)
- March 10 – Balthasar Hübmaier, influential German/Moravian Anabaptist leader (b. 1480)
- April 1 – Francisco de Peñalosa, Spanish composer (b. c. 1470)
- April 6 – Albrecht Dürer, German artist, writer, and mathematician (b. 1471)
- July – Palma il Vecchio, Italian painter (b. 1480)
- August 15 – Odet de Foix, Vicomte de Lautrec, French military leader (b. 1485)
- August 20 – Georg von Frundsberg, German knight and landowner (b. 1473)
- August 23 – Louis, Count of Vaudémont, Italian bishop (b. 1500)
- August 31 – Matthias Grünewald, German artist (b. 1470)
- September – Pánfilo de Narváez, Spanish conqueror and soldier in the Americas (b. 1480)
- October 5 – Richard Foxe, English churchman (b. c. 1448)
- October 18 – Michele Antonio, Marquess of Saluzzo (b. 1495)
- October 21 – Johann of Schwarzenberg, German judge and poet (b. 1463)
- November 17 – Jakob Wimpfeling, Renaissance humanist (b. 1450)
- December 7 – Margaret of Saxony, Duchess of Brunswick-Lüneburg (b. 1469)
- date unknown
  - Giovanni da Verrazzano, Italian explorer (b. 1485)
  - Peter Vischer the Younger, German sculptor (b. 1487)
  - Mahmud Shah of Malacca, Malaccan sultan
  - Daljunkern, Swedish rebel leader who may have been pretender Nils Sture (b. 1512)
  - Barbro Stigsdotter, Swedish noblewoman and heroine (b. 1472)
  - Guru Ravidas, (b. 1377)

1529

Baldassare Castiglione

- January 7 – Peter Vischer the Elder, German sculptor (b. 1455)
- January 9 – Wang Yangming, Chinese Neo-Confucian scholar (b. 1472)
- January 29 – Ōuchi Yoshioki, Japanese daimyo (b. 1477)
- February 2 – Baldassare Castiglione, Italian writer and diplomat (b. 1478)
- February 4 – Ludwig Haetzer, German Protestant reformer (executed) (b. 1500)
- March 28 – Philipp II, Count of Hanau-Münzenberg (b. 1501)
- April 20 – Silvio Passerini, Italian cardinal and lord of Florence (b. 1469)
- May 12 – Cecily Bonville, 7th Baroness Harington (b. c. 1460)
- June 21 – John Skelton, English poet (b. c. 1460)
- September 6 – George Blaurock, Swiss founder of the Anabaptist Church (b. 1491)
- September 27 – George of the Palatinate, German nobleman; Bishop of Speyer (1513–1529) (b. 1486)
- November 20 – Karl von Miltitz, German papal nuncio (b. c. 1490)
- date unknown
  - Krishnadevaraya, Vijaynagar emperor
  - Richard Pynson, Norman-born English printer (b. 1448)
  - Andrea Sansovino, Italian sculptor (b. 1467)
  - Petrus Särkilahti, Finnish Lutheran and scientist
  - Paulus Aemilius Veronensis, Italian historian (b. 1455)
- probable – Lo Spagna, Italian painter
- possible – La Malinche, Nahua (native Mexican) interpreter and translator for Hernán Cortés, during the Conquest of Mexico
