= 1527 =

1527 in various calendars
- Gregorian calendar: 1527; MDXXVII
- Ab urbe condita: 2280
- Armenian calendar: 976; ԹՎ ՋՀԶ
- Assyrian calendar: 6277
- Balinese saka calendar: 1448–1449
- Bengali calendar: 933–934
- Berber calendar: 2477
- English Regnal year: 18 Hen. 8 – 19 Hen. 8
- Buddhist calendar: 2071
- Burmese calendar: 889
- Byzantine calendar: 7035–7036
- Chinese calendar: 丙戌年 (Fire Dog); 4224 or 4017 — to — 丁亥年 (Fire Pig); 4225 or 4018
- Coptic calendar: 1243–1244
- Discordian calendar: 2693
- Ethiopian calendar: 1519–1520
- Hebrew calendar: 5287–5288
- Hindu calendars
- Vikram Samvat: 1583–1584
- Shaka Samvat: 1448–1449
- Kali Yuga: 4627–4628
- Holocene calendar: 11527
- Igbo calendar: 527–528
- Iranian calendar: 905–906
- Islamic calendar: 933–934
- Japanese calendar: Daiei 7 (大永７年)
- Javanese calendar: 1445–1446
- Julian calendar: 1527; MDXXVII
- Korean calendar: 3860
- Minguo calendar: 385 before ROC 民前385年
- Nanakshahi calendar: 59
- Thai solar calendar: 2069–2070
- Tibetan calendar: མེ་ཕོ་ཁྱི་ལོ་ (male Fire-Dog); 1653 or 1272 or 500 — to — མེ་མོ་ཕག་ལོ་ (female Fire-Boar); 1654 or 1273 or 501

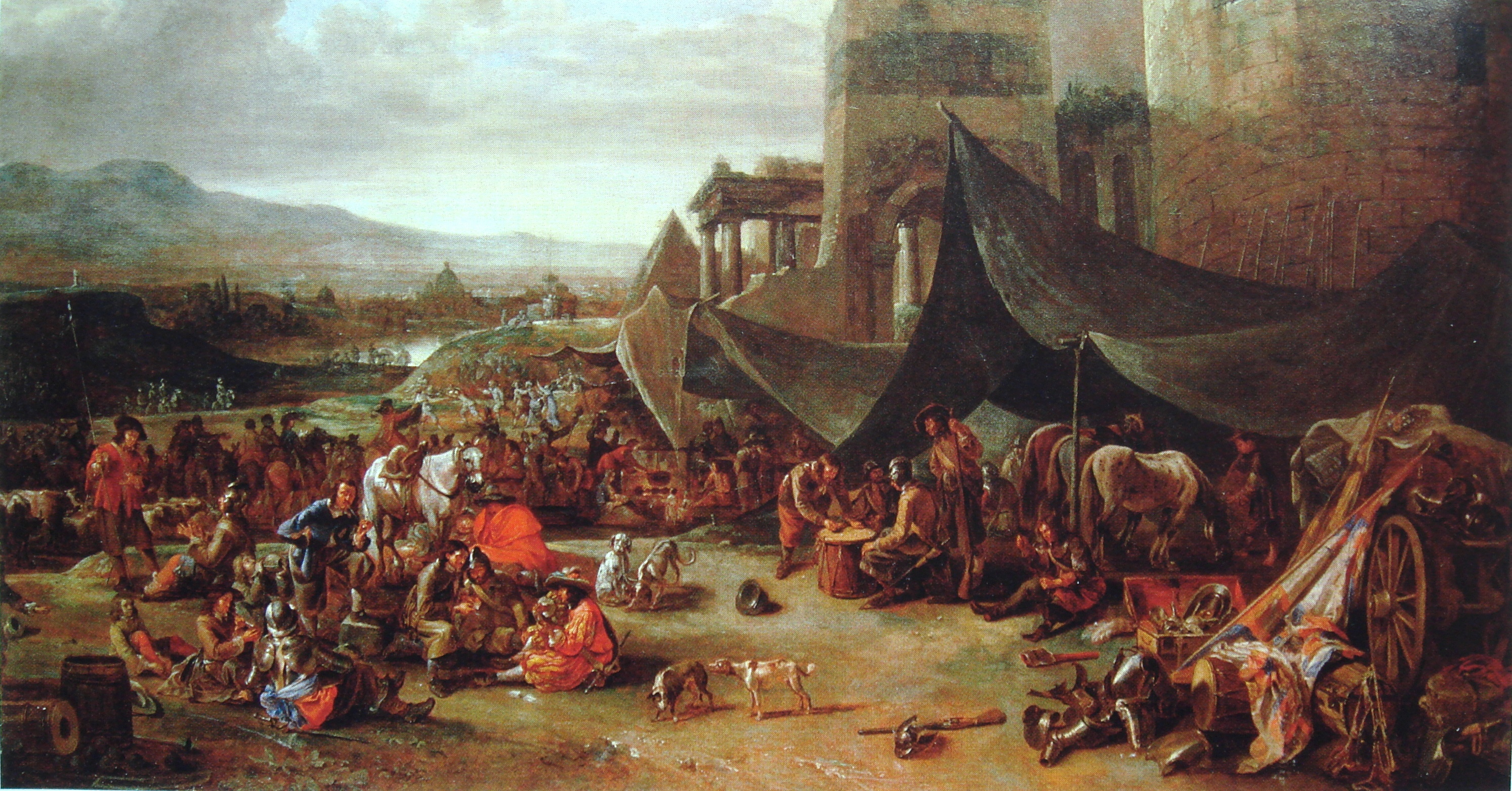
May 6: Spanish and German troops sack Rome.

Year 1527 (MDXXVII) was a common year starting on Tuesday of the Julian calendar.

== Events ==
=== January–March ===
- January 1 – Croatian nobles elect Austrian monarch Ferdinand I as King of Croatia in the Parliament on Cetin.
- January 5 – Felix Manz, co-founder of the Swiss Anabaptists, is drowned in the Limmat in Zürich by the Zürich Reformed state church.
- February 14 – Queen consort Mary of Hungary, named as regent for the kingdom upon the August 29 death of her husband Louis II, asks permission from the Hungarian Diet to step down as the regent for the newly elected Frederick of Habsburg, but is denied.
- February 21 – The Mughal–Rajput wars begin in India between the Emperor Babur of the Mughal Empire and states of the Rajput Confederacy, with the victory of the Rajput faction at the Battle of Bayana.
- February 24 –
  - Ferdinand of the House of Habsburg is formally crowned as King of Bohemia at Pressburg (modern Bratislava in Slovakia).
  - The seven articles of the Schleitheim Confession are formally adopted by the Mennonite Anabaptist Christians at Schleitheim in the Canton of Schaffhausen in Switzerland.
- March 17 – In India, the Battle of Khanwa is fought as the Mughal Emperor Babur defeats Rajput ruler Rana Sanga. This and two other major Moghul victories lead to their domination of northern India. Dhaulpur fort is taken by Babur.
- March 25 – The Confederation of Shan States sacks Ava, the capital of the Ava Kingdom.

=== April–June ===
- April 30 – The Treaty of Westminster (1527), an alliance during the War of the League of Cognac, is signed.
- May 6 – Sack of Rome: Spanish and German troops led by the Duke of Bourbon sack Rome, forcing the Medici Pope Clement VII to make peace with Charles V, Holy Roman Emperor, marking the end of the High Renaissance. The Pope grows a beard in mourning.
- May 16 – In Florence, the Piagnon, a group devoted to the memory of Girolamo Savonarola, drive out the Medici for a second time, re-establishing the Republic of Florence until 1530.
- June 17
  - The Narváez expedition to conquer Florida sets sail from Spain.
  - The Protestant Reformation begins in Sweden. The Riksdag of the Estates in Västerås adopts Lutheranism as the state religion, in place of Roman Catholicism. This results in the confiscation of church property and dissolution of Catholic convents in accordance with the Reduction of Gustav I of Sweden.
- June 22 – Jakarta, modern-day capital of Indonesia, is founded as Jayakarta.

=== July–September ===
- July 5 – General Div Sultan Rumlu, the regent for the 13-year old Tahmasp I, the Safavid Shah of Iran, is assassinated and replaced by Chukha Sultan Tekali.
- July 25 – The Battle of Sződfalva is fought near Szeged in modern-day Hungary, with an army of Hungarians and Romanian Transylvanians defeating a Serbian army led by Jovan Nenad, the self-proclaimed Emperor of the Serbs. The next day, Nenad is assassinated for his failure in battle.
- August 3 – The first known letter is sent from North America by John Rut, while at St. John's, Newfoundland, during his voyage to the New World.
- August 20
  - Sixty Anabaptists meet at the Martyrs' Synod in Augsburg.
  - Diet of Odense (Denmark): King Frederick I declares religious tolerance for Lutherans, permits marriage of priests and forbids seeking papal pallium (approval) for royal appointments of Church officials.
- September 27 – Battle of Tarcal: Ferdinand, future Holy Roman Emperor, defeats John Zápolya and takes over most of Hungary. John appeals to the Ottomans for help.

=== October–December ===
- October 5 – French and Venetian troops kill thousands of civilians in the Italian city of Pavia, even after the defenders agree to surrender.
- October 31 – Spanish conquistador Álvaro de Saavedra Cerón departs from Zihuatanejo in modern-day Mexico on a voyage of exploration of the Pacific Ocean, along with three ships, Saavedra's flagship La Florida, and the vessels Espiritu Santo and Santiago.
- November 3 – Archduke Ferdinand of Austria is formally crowned as the King of Hungary at the Basilica of the Assumption of the Blessed Virgin Mary at Székesfehérvár.
- November 4 – In India, Puranmal becomes the new Raja of the Kingdom of Amber (in the modern Indian state of Rajasthan) after his father, the Raja Prithviraj Singh I, dies of wounds sustained in March in the Battle of Khanwa.
- November 15 – The lands of the Bishopric of Utrecht, in the modern Netherlands, are ceded to control of the Habsburgs in return for assistance in suppressing a rebellion by the citizens of Utrecht.
- November 22 – Spain's conquest of Guatemala's highlands is completed as the capital of the colonial government is moved to the new city of Ciudad Vieja from Santiago de los Caballeros de Guatemala, near Iximche.
- November 23 – The Érdy Codex, the largest collection of Hungarian legends and Hungarian language literature, is completed on Saint Clement's Day by an unidentified Carthusian monk at the seminary of Nagyszombat in Hungary (modern Trnava in Slovakia).
- December 6 – Pope Clement VII, held prisoner at the Castel Sant'Angelo since the sack of Rome in May, is released after seven months of captivity, along with 16 Roman Catholic cardinals.
- December 15 – Two of the three ships of Álvaro de Saavedra are separated from his own vessel, La Florida, during a storm. The Espiritu Santo and Santiago, sailing ahead of La Florida, are never heard from again.

=== Date unknown ===
- The second of the Dalecarlian rebellions breaks out in Sweden.
- Members of the University of Wittenberg flee to Jena in fear of the bubonic plague.
- In England, Bishop Vesey's Grammar School (at Sutton Coldfield, in the West Midlands) is founded by Bishop John Vesey; and Sir George Monoux College is founded as a grammar school at Walthamstow by Sir George Monoux, draper and Lord Mayor of London.
- The Ming dynasty government of China greatly reduces the quotas for taking grain, severely diminishing the state's capacity to relieve famines through a previously successful granary system.

== Births ==
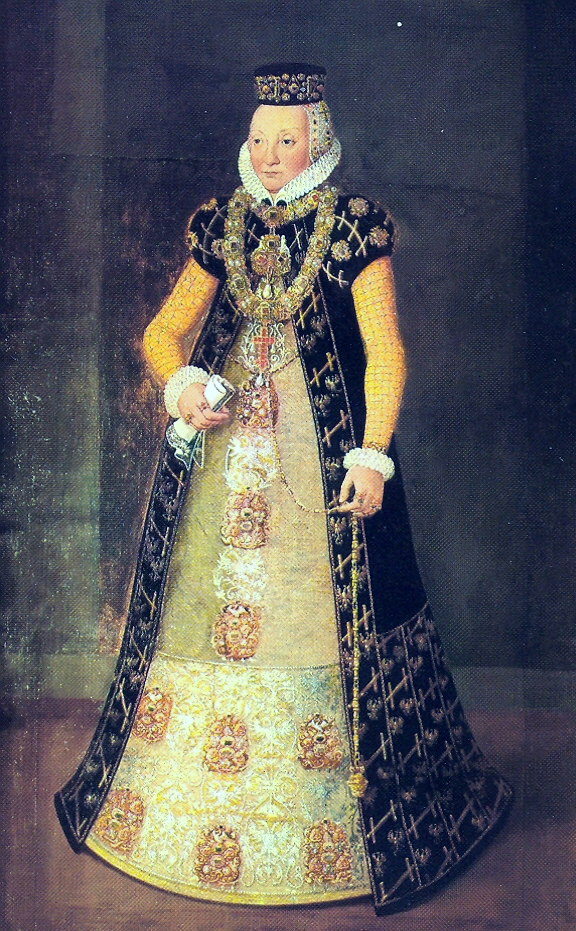
Anna Sophia of Prussia

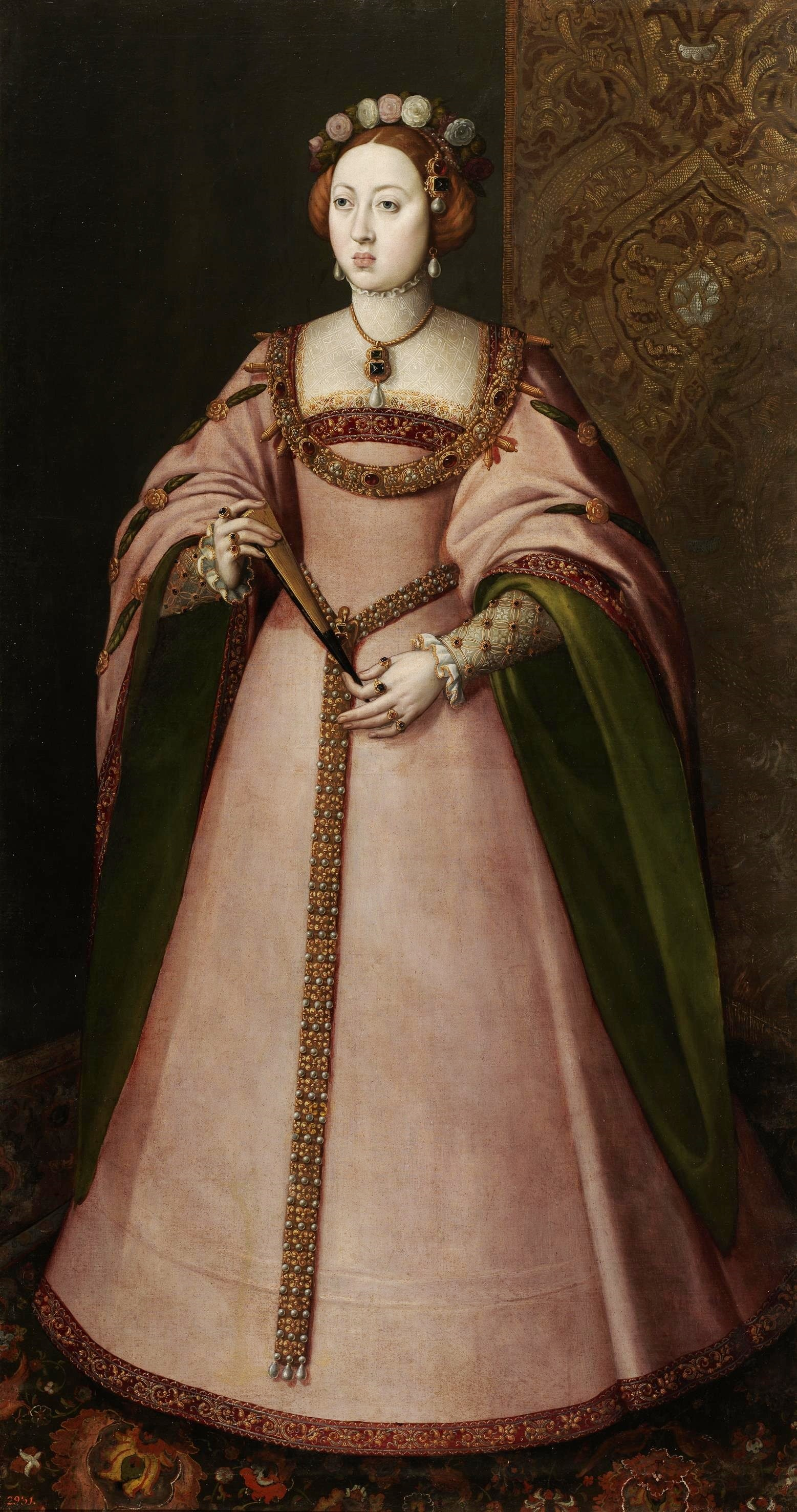
Maria Manuela, Princess of Portugal

- March 4 – Ludwig Lavater, Swiss Reformed theologian (d. 1586)
- March 5 – Ulrich, Duke of Mecklenburg (d. 1603)
- March 10 – Alfonso d'Este, Lord of Montecchio, Italian nobleman (d. 1587)
- March 21 – Hermann Finck, German composer and music theorist (d. 1558)
- March 28 – Isabella Markham, English courtier (d. 1579)
- March 31 – Edward Fitton, the elder, Irish politician (d. 1579)
- April 14 – Abraham Ortelius, Flemish cartographer and geographer (d. 1598)
- c. May 1 – Johannes Stadius, German astronomer, astrologer, mathematician (d. 1579)
- May 21 – Philip II, King of Spain (d. 1598)
- May 31 – Agnes of Hesse, German noble, by marriage, Princess of Saxony (d. 1555)
- June 11 – Anna Sophia of Prussia, Duchess of Prussia and Duchess of Mecklenburg (d. 1591)
- June 24 – Jean Vendeville, French law professor, Roman Catholic bishop (d. 1592)
- July 8 – Saitō Yoshitatsu, Japanese daimyō (d. 1561)
- July 13 – John Dee, English mathematician, astronomer, and geographer (d. 1608)
- July 31 – Maximilian II, Holy Roman Emperor (d. 1576)
- August 10 – Barbara of Brandenburg, Duchess of Brieg, German princess (d. 1595)
- September 29 – John Lesley, Scottish bishop (d. 1596)
- October 2 – William Drury, English politician (d. 1579)
- October 15 – Maria Manuela, Princess of Portugal (d. 1545)
- October 21 – Louis I, Cardinal of Guise, French Catholic cardinal (d. 1578)
- November 1
  - Pedro de Ribadeneira, Spanish hagiologist (d. 1611)
  - William Brooke, 10th Baron Cobham, English noble and politician (d. 1597)
- November 3 – Tilemann Heshusius, Gnesio-Lutheran theologian (d. 1588)
- November 18 – Luca Cambiasi, Italian painter (d. 1585)
- December 6 – Bernhard VIII, Count of Lippe (d. 1563)
- December 23 – Hugues Doneau, French lawyer (d. 1591)
- date unknown
  - Luis de León, Spanish lyric poet and mystic (d. 1591)
  - Annibale Padovano, Italian composer and organist (d. 1575)
- probable
  - John Dudley, 2nd Earl of Warwick, English nobleman (d. 1554)
  - Lawrence Humphrey, English clergyman and educator (d. 1590)

== Deaths ==
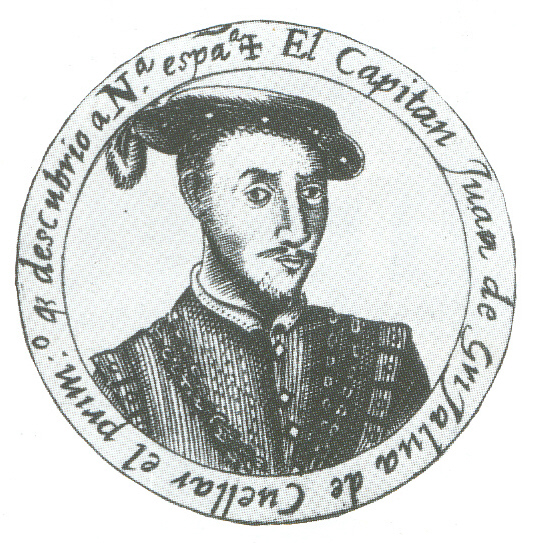
Juan de Grijalva

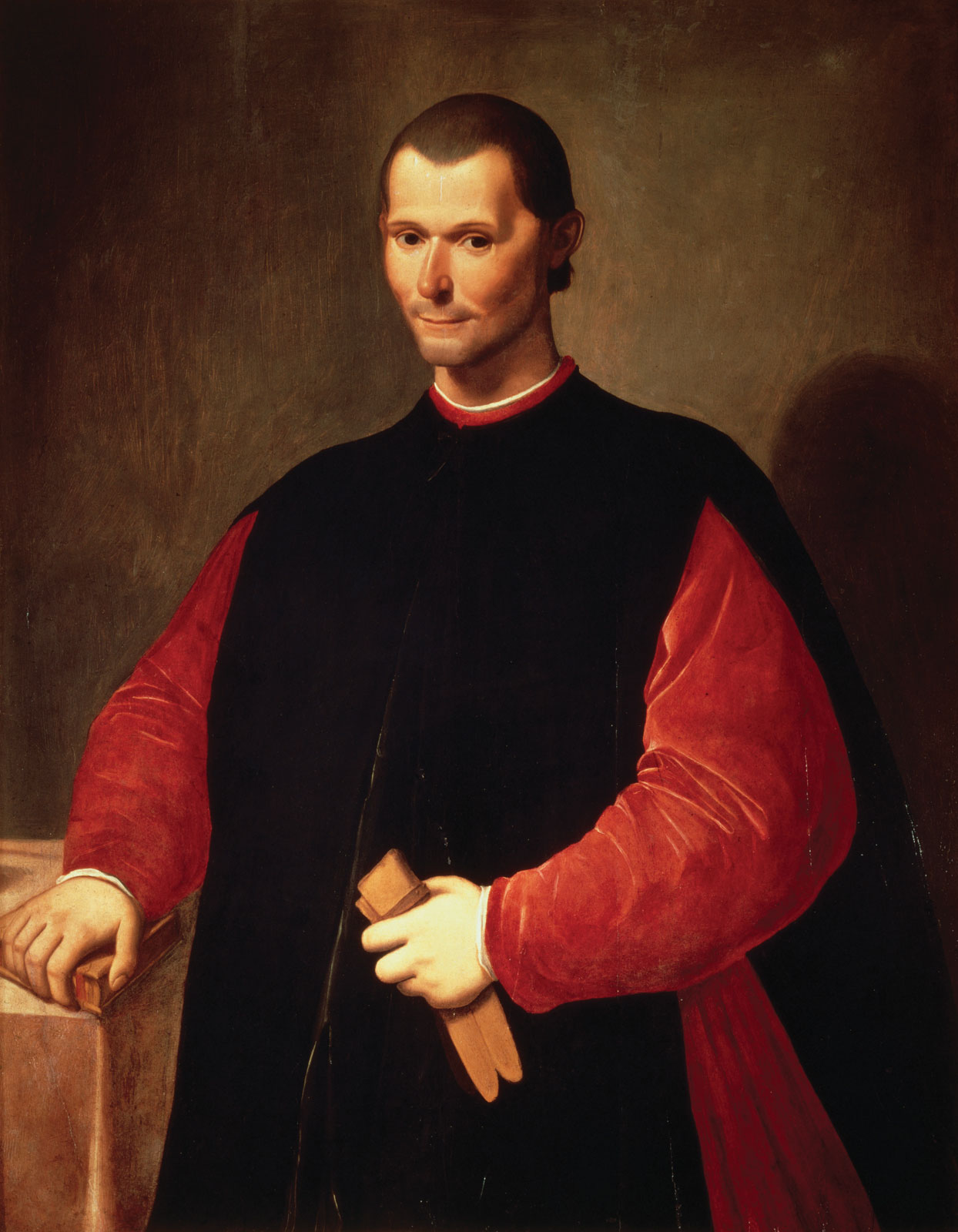
Niccolò Machiavelli

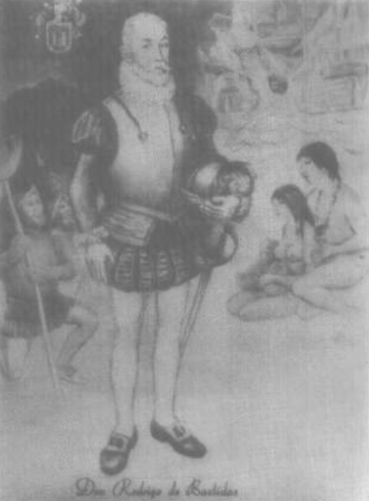
Rodrigo de Bastidas

- January 5 – Felix Manz, leader of the Swiss Anabaptists (executed) (b. 1498)
- January 21 – Juan de Grijalva, Spanish conqueror (b. 1489)
- March 14 – Shwenankyawshin, Burmese king of Ava (b. 1476)
- March 17 – Rana Sanga, Indian ruler (b. 1484)
- April 19
  - Christoph I, Margrave of Baden-Baden (b. 1453)
  - Henry Percy, 5th Earl of Northumberland (b. 1477)
- April/May – Sir Thomas Docwra, English Grand Prior of the Knights Hospitaller (b. 1458)
- May 6 – Charles III, Duke of Bourbon, Count of Montpensier and Dauphin of Auvergne (b. 1490)
- June 21 – Niccolò Machiavelli, Italian writer and statesman (b. 1469)
- June 28 – Bernardo de' Rossi, Italian bishop (b. 1468)
- July 28 – Rodrigo de Bastidas, Spanish conqueror and explorer (b. c. 1460)
- July 31 – Anna Swenonis, Swedish manuscript illuminator
- August 16 – Leonhard Kaiser, German Lutheran theologian and reformer (executed) (b. c. 1480)
- September 21 – Casimir, Margrave of Brandenburg-Kulmbach, Margrave of Bayreuth (b. 1481)
- October 27 – Johann Froben, Swiss printer and publisher (b. c. 1460)
- November 15 – Catherine of York, English princess (b. 1479)
- November 8 – Jerome Emser, German theologian (b. 1477)
- date unknown
  - Francesco Colonna, Italian Dominican priest (b. 1433)
  - Luisa de Medrano, Spanish scholar (b. 1484)
  - Div Sultan Rumlu, Persian military leader
  - Petrus Thaborita, Frisian historian and monk (b. c. 1450)
  - Cristoforo Solari, Italian sculptor and architect (b. c. 1460)
  - Jan "Ciężki" Tarnowski, Polish nobleman (b. c. 1479)
  - Huayna Capac, Sapa Inca of the Inca Empire (b. 1493)
  - Ludovico Vicentino degli Arrighi, Italian calligrapher and type designer (b. 1475)
- probable – Jane Shore, mistress of King Edward IV of England
