= Sampson =

Sampson may refer to:

== Military ==
- HMS Sampson, several Royal Navy ships
- USS Sampson, several US Navy ships
- Sampson-class destroyer, a World War I US Navy class
- Sampson Air Force Base, near Seneca Lake, New York, closed in 1956
- SAMPSON, a multi-function radar system for warships
- Sampson Medal, a military decoration of the United States Navy

== Places ==
=== Australia ===
- Sampson Flat, South Australia, a locality
- Sampson Inlet, Western Australia, part of Camden Sound

=== Byzantine Empire ===
- Alternative Greek name in the 13th century CE for Priene, after the biblical hero

=== United States ===
- Sampson City, Florida, an unincorporated community
- Sampson's Island (Massachusetts), an uninhabited barrier island
- Sampsons Pond, Carver, Massachusetts
- Sampson, Missouri, an unincorporated community
- Sampson State Park, Seneca County, New York, at one time Sampson Air Force Base
- Sampson County, North Carolina
- Sampson, Wisconsin, a town
- Sampson, Oconto County, Wisconsin, an unincorporated community

=== Other places ===
- Saint Sampson, Guernsey, a parish of Guernsey, Channel Islands
- St Sampson, Cornwall, a civil parish in England
- Sampson (crater)

== People ==
- Sampson the Hospitable (6th century), venerated as a saint in the Eastern Orthodox and Catholic Churches
- Sampson (surname), a list of people and fictional characters
- Sampson (given name), a list of historical and Biblical figures and fictional characters

== Other uses ==
- Sampson (automobile), American automobile manufactured in 1904
- Sampson (horse), a shire horse that is the tallest horse on record
- Sampson, an American merchant ship involved in the 1793 Sampson Incident
- Locomotive Sampson, built 1855, one of the four South Devon Railway Tornado class steam locomotives
- SS Admiral Sampson, an American-flagged cargo and passenger steamship, 1898–1914
- St Sampson's Church, Golant, Cornwall, England
- Sampson (ship), an English vessel in 1527

== See also ==
- Saint-Samson (disambiguation)
- Samson (disambiguation)
- Simpson (disambiguation)
