= Samson (disambiguation) =

Samson is a Biblical figure known for his exceptional strength.

Samson may also refer to:

== Arts and entertainment ==
=== Fictional characters ===
==== Film and television ====
- Samson Clogmeyer, animated TV series character; see list of Camp Lazlo characters
- Brock Samson, animated TV series character; see list of The Venture Bros. characters
- Samson the bear, from Sesamstraße, the German-language version of children's show Sesame Street
- Edgar "Samson" Leonhardt, from the American TV series Carnivàle
- One of the title characters of the Hanna-Barbera cartoon Samson & Goliath
- A talking dog in the Belgian children's show Samson en Gert
- Samson, from the British children's series Thomas & Friends
- Samson, from the comedy film Half Baked
- Samson, in the 28 Days Later film series

==== Comics ====
- Samson (Fox Feature Syndicate), a Golden Age character
- Black Samson, one of the Guardians of the Globe from Invincible
- Doc Samson, a Marvel superhero
- Mighty Samson, a Gold Key Comics character
- Samson, a member of the Marvel Comics team the Morlocks
- Samson, a plush Monica and Friends character

==== Other fictional characters ====
- The title character of Samson Agonistes, a 1671 closet drama by John Milton based on the biblical story
- Samson, from Need for Speed: Carbon
- Samson, from The Bronze Bow
- Samson McCray, from Samson

=== Plays and films ===
- Samson (play), a 1908 play by the French writer Henri Bernstein, basis of the 1915, 1923 and 1936 films below
- Samson (1914 film), an American short
- Samson (1915 film), an American production
- Samson (1923 film), an Italian movie
- Samson (1936 film), a French film directed by Maurice Tourneur
- Samson (1961 Polish film), directed by Andrzej Wajda
- Samson (1961 Italian film), by Gianfranco Parolini
- The early 1960s Italian "Samson" film series
- Samson (2018 film), an American film by Bruce Macdonald

=== Music ===
- Samson (band), a British hard rock band, formed in 1977 by guitarist and vocalist Paul Samson
- Samsons, an Indonesian pop-rock band
- Samson (Handel), an oratorio by George Frideric Handel
- Samson (opera), a 1734 lost opera Jean-Philippe Rameau, libretto by Voltaire
- "Samson" (Emly Starr song), Belgian entry in the Eurovision Song Contest, 1981
- "Samson" (Regina Spektor song), 2006
- "Samson", by Godley & Creme from Birds of Prey, 1983
- "Samson", by V V Brown from Samson & Delilah, 2013

=== Other media ===
- Samson (magazine), a Japanese gay magazine featuring chubby and older men
- Samson (video game), 2026
- "Samson", a 1988 art installation by Chris Burden

== Companies ==
- Samson AG, German corporation
- Samson Ceramics, a porcelain firm 1845–1969
- Samson Tractor, a division of General Motors from 1917 to 1922, which also made trucks
- Samson, an Irish film production company, producers of Once
- Samson Technologies, an American audio equipment company; see Wireless microphone

== People ==
- Samson (name), a list of people with the given name or surname
- Samson (rapper) (1987–2020), English rapper and Cannabis activist
- El Santo, Mexican wrestler and film actor Rodolfo Guzmán Huerta (1917–1984) (English stage name "Samson")
- Siriporn Thaweesuk, female Muay Thai boxing champion, known by the ring name "Samson"

== Places ==
- Samson, Isles of Scilly, UK
- Samson, Alabama, US
- Sầm Sơn, Vietnam
- Samson, Western Australia, a suburb of Perth
- Samson, Doubs, France
- Samson Indian Reserve No. 137, Alberta, Canada

== Military and militancy ==
=== Overview ===
- Cultural references to Samson § Military and militant references to Samson

=== Military hardware ===
- FV106 Samson, a British Army armoured recovery vehicle
- Lockheed Martin C-130J Super Hercules, a transport aircraft known as the "Samson" in Israeli service
- Samson Remote Controlled Weapon Station, an Israeli remote weapon system

=== Military units ===
- Samson Unit, a special forces unit within the Israel Defense Forces (1988–1995)
- Samson Brigade Kfir Brigade § Brigade organization

=== Operations and strategy ===
- For a full list, see Samson § Operation Samson
- For the 1947 suicide operation, see Suicide attack § 1947
- For the 1967 nuclear plan during the Six-Day War, see Operation Samson § Deterrence doctrine
- Samson Option, a deterrence strategy of massive retaliation with nuclear weapons, especially as applied to Israel

== Science and technology ==
=== Biology ===
- Samson (dinosaur), a dinosaur skeleton with the most complete Tyrannosaurus rex skull ever found
- Samson (gorilla) (1949–1981), a male silverback western lowland gorilla
- Samson fish, a jack of the genus Seriola

=== Computing ===
- SAMSON (Software for Adaptive Modeling and Simulation Of Nanosystems), a software platform for computational nanoscience
- Samson, a name for the ND-5000 32-bit processor made by Norsk Data

=== Other technology ===
- Samson Ultra, a trademark name for .50 Action Express preloaded handgun ammunition
- Samson and Goliath (cranes), twin shipbuilding gantry cranes in Queen's Island, Belfast, Northern Ireland

== Vehicles ==
=== Locomotives ===
- Samson, an 1831 locomotive of the Liverpool & Manchester Railway
- Samson (locomotive), built in 1838, Canada's oldest locomotive
- Sampson (1855–1884), a South Devon Railway Tornado class steam locomotive
- Samson, an 1874 steam locomotive at Cornish Hush Mine

=== Other vehicles ===
- Samson (crane barge), wrecked on the Irish coast in 1987
- La Mouette Samson, a French ultralight trike design
- City of New York (1885 ship), originally the Norwegian ship Samson
- Samson (ship), lost off the Canadian coast in 1527

== Other uses ==
- Samson (gorilla) (1949–1981), a male silverback western lowland gorilla
- Samson and Goliath (cranes), twin shipbuilding gantry cranes in Queen's Island, Belfast, Northern Ireland
- Samson, an alternative name for the wine grape Cinsaut

== See also ==
- Samson and Delilah (disambiguation)
- Aaj Ka Samson (lit. 'Today's Samson'), a 1991 Indian film
- Sampson (disambiguation)
- Sansom, a surname
- Sanson (disambiguation)
- Samsun, Turkey
- Samsung, a South Korean multinational conglomerate
