= Floating bladderwort =

Floating bladderwort may be a common name for:

- Utricularia gibba, floating bladderwort
- Utricularia inflata, large floating bladderwort
- Utricularia radiata, little floating bladderwort
