= Samson and Delilah =

Samson and Delilah are Biblical figures.

Samson and Delilah may also refer to:

== In music ==
- Samson and Delilah (opera), an opera by Camille Saint-Saëns
- Samson & Delilah (album), released in 2013 by V V Brown
- "Samson and Delilah" (traditional song), a song most famously played by the Grateful Dead
- Samson and Delilah (Middle of the Road song)
- Samson and Delilah (Bad Manners song), from the album Forging Ahead

== Films ==
- Samson and Delilah (1922 film)
- Samson and Delilah (1949 film)
- Samson and Delilah (1984 film)
- Samson and Delilah (1996 film)
- Samson and Delilah (2009 film)

== Art ==
- There have been many depictions in art, some listed here
- The subject is one of those commonly found in the Power of women trope in art and literature
- Samson and Delilah (painting), a painting by Peter Paul Rubens
- Samson and Delilah (van Dyck, London), a painting by Anthony van Dyck
- Samson and Delilah (van Dyck, Vienna), a painting by Anthony van Dyck
- Samson and Delilah (Guercino), a painting by Guercino
- Samson and Delilah (Riguad), a 1784 painting by John Francis Rigaud

== Other uses ==
- Samson and Delilah (play), a 1911 play by Johannes Linnankoski
- "Samson and Delilah" (Terminator: The Sarah Connor Chronicles), an episode of the TV series Terminator: The Sarah Connor Chronicles
- Samson and Delilah, the club mascots of the Sunderland A.F.C. English football club
- "Samson and Delilah" is a short story by D. H. Lawrence in his short story collection England, My England and Other Stories

== See also ==
- Sansão e Dalila, a 2011 Brazilian miniseries
- "Simpson and Delilah", a 1990 episode of the TV series The Simpsons
- "Sam and Delilah", a song by George and Ira Gershwin
