= Dunham Pond (Carver, Massachusetts) =

Lake of the United States of America

- Location within Massachusetts Location within the United States
- Location: Carver, Massachusetts
- Coordinates: 41°52′01″N 70°44′00″W
- Basin countries: United States
- Surface area: 45 acres (18 ha)

Dunham Pond is a 45-acre (180,000 m^{2}) pond in Carver, Massachusetts, United States. The pond is located northeast of Sampsons Pond and southwest of Federal Pond.
