= Sampsons Pond =

Pond in Carver, Massachusetts, United States

- Location within Massachusetts
- Location: Carver, Massachusetts
- Coordinates: 41°51′00″N 70°45′00″W
- Basin countries: United States
- Surface area: 310 acres (130 ha)
- Average depth: 9 ft (2.7 m)
- Max. depth: 14 ft (4.3 m)
- Settlements: South Carver

Sampsons Pond (also called Sampson's Pond and Sampson Pond) is a 310-acre (1.3 km^{2}) warm water infertile pond in Carver, Massachusetts, in the South Carver section of town, southwest of Dunham Pond. The pond has an average depth of nine feet and a maximum depth of 14 feet (4.3 m). The water is clear with a transparency of 12 feet (3.7 m). Access to the pond is a paved launching ramp off Lake View St. suitable for trailer boats. Although there is no launching fee, the Town of Carver requires a sticker for one to park on town land next to the ramp.

Sampsons Pond was once a marsh. During the early 19th century Carver was a big producer of bog iron. Sampsons Pond was dug out for its iron ore. This accounts for the rusty color seen in the water, as well as the pieces of ore that can be found in the area.
