= Federal Pond =

Pond in Massachusetts, United States

- Location within Massachusetts
- Location: Carver and Plymouth, Massachusetts
- Coordinates: 41°52′30″N 70°42′30″W
- Basin countries: United States
- Surface area: 129 acres (52 ha)
- Islands: Two unnamed islands

Federal Pond is a 129-acre (0.52 km^{2}) pond in Carver and Plymouth, Massachusetts. A small portion of the northeastern shore of the pond is in the Myles Standish State Forest. The pond is located southwest of Rocky Pond and Curlew Pond, and northeast of Dunham Pond. Two unnamed islands lie in the middle of the pond. The water quality is impaired due to non-native aquatic plants and non-native fish species.

The only road leading to the pond, Old Federal Road in Carver, is a private road. As such, the pond is officially off limits to the public, although a high tension line right of way crosses the northern tip of the pond and is frequented by sport fishermen.
