= Samson (video game) =

2026 video game

- Developer: Liquid Swords
- Publisher: Liquid Swords
- Director: Christofer Sundberg
- Composer: Jesper Kyd
- Engine: Unreal Engine 5
- Platforms: Windows; PlayStation 5; Xbox Series X/S
- Release: Windows; 8 April 2026; PS5, Xbox Series X/S; 21 September 2026
- Genres: Action-adventure, beat 'em up
- Mode: Single-player

Samson: A Tyndalston Story is a 2026 action-adventure video game developed and published by Liquid Swords. It was released for Windows in April 2026 and for PlayStation 5 and Xbox Series X/S in September 2026. The game received mixed reviews from critics and was a commercial failure.

== Gameplay ==
Samson is a third-person open world beat 'em up and driving game. The player can utilize both light and heavy attacks to defeat enemies. He can also use the environment to his advantage and parry hostile attacks.

The player assumes control of Samson McCray, who must complete jobs for an underground syndicate to pay off his debt. As players explore the city of Tyndalston and complete missions, they will earn experience points, which can be used to upgrade Samson's skills and abilities. Failure to repay a certain amount of debt each day will result in the player character being pursued by debt collectors the following day while gaining a strike in the process where failure to pay off the debt for three consecutive days will result in a game over where the player can choose to restart from the day before or load a new save.

== Plot ==
Samson McCray returns to the city of Tyndalston after a heist in St. Louis goes wrong. His sister Oonagh manages to work with a St. Louis gang to pay his way out of prison, but now Oonagh is being held in St. Louis as collateral for Samson’s debt. Samson meets up with his old gang leader, Carter, his right-hand man Tommy, and their friend Nate to start getting jobs to pay his debt.

After a few jobs, the four are meeting at Nate’s bar when a hit and run leaves Nate wounded. Carter instructs Samson and Tommy to start looking into who ordered it. Samson begins to work his way through multiple gangs before eventually learning the hit was paid for and orchestrated by Danny Zeta. Samson finds and kills Danny.

Despite this, Carter and Samson believe that Danny was getting his orders from someone else. They eventually learn of a drug dealer named Volkov who paid for the hit. Volkov is pushing a new drug called White Whisper and is kidnapping homeless people for an unknown reason. Volkov attempts to kill Samson at church, but fails. Samson manages to hunt him down, and before killing him, Volkov reveals that he’s been bringing the homeless people to a rich mansion.

Wanting to find out why, Samson arrives at the mansion and discovers that the homeless people are being used as sex slaves, butchered, and eaten by a rich woman named Nicola Gamby. She reveals that she has been playing all the gangs against each other, hoping to drive residents out of Tyndalston so she can buy their property and sell it to a richer crowd. She warns Samson that if he kills her, there’s someone above her who will come after him. Samson decides to kill her anyway.

Not wanting to be surprised by this new threat, Carter begins looking into Gamby’s dealings. He discovers, through a contact, that she kept all of her info on a floppy disk, which is being held in the same vault as a diamond. The contact agrees to keep silent if Samson brings him the diamond while grabbing the floppy. Samson gets both, but when he goes to the contact, he finds that Tommy has killed him. Tommy reveals that he is the man at the top, and tries to convince Samson to leave Carter, split the profits from the diamond between them to pay off his debt, and start a new life elsewhere. Samson refuses and kills Tommy.

In a post-credits phone call, Carter reveals that he's actively working on selling the diamond and also sending his own people to get rid of anyone connected to Tommy and Gamby. If the player pays off Samson’s debt, then Oonagh calls to say she’s free and returning to Tyndalston so the two can begin working together again.

== Development and release ==
Samson was developed by Swedish studio Liquid Swords, formed by Avalanche Studios co-founder Christofer Sundberg. The game was originally developed as an action role-playing game. However, Liquid Swords faced development troubles after "the reality of the industry hit" in 2025, and the studio laid off about half of the team. As a result, the game had to be restructured, and ranged combat was removed. The game was released on 8 April 2026 for Windows. Sundberg said in an post at the time that the launch version contained "game-breaking bugs and performance issues", which was unacceptable and that Samson would "grow over time on all fronts". Versions for PlayStation 5 and Xbox Series X/S were released on 21 September 2026.

== Reception ==
Reception

Aggregate scores
Aggregator	Score
Metacritic	51/100
OpenCritic	32% recommend

Review scores
Publication	Score
Destructoid	6/10
IGN	4/10

Samson received "mixed or average" reviews from critics, according to review aggregator Metacritic. Fellow review aggregator OpenCritic assessed that the game received weak approval, being recommended by 32% of critics.

IGN rated the game 4/10, criticizing the repetitive gameplay, calling the combat unresponsive, outlining the poor technical state and comparing the game to similarly poorly received MindsEye, though praise was directed at the gritty aesthetic. Similar remarks were expressed by Gamereactor UK, who also rated the game 4/10 and stated that Samson "feels like a collection of good ideas that never quite come together. You can see what the developers have tried to do, but it seems as though they haven't had the resources to bring it to life properly." Destructoid was more complimentary of the game, giving it a score of 6/10 and calling the game mechanics unique and "not entirely devoid of entertainment value", though stated that "the execution of nearly every feature in this game feels like a misfire".

=== Sales ===
As of 14 October 2026, Samson had sold 151,900 units and generated SEK 24.1 million ($2.4 million) in revenue. This commercial failure lead to Liquid Swords filing for bankruptcy.
