= John Rut =

English explorer (fl. 1512–1528)

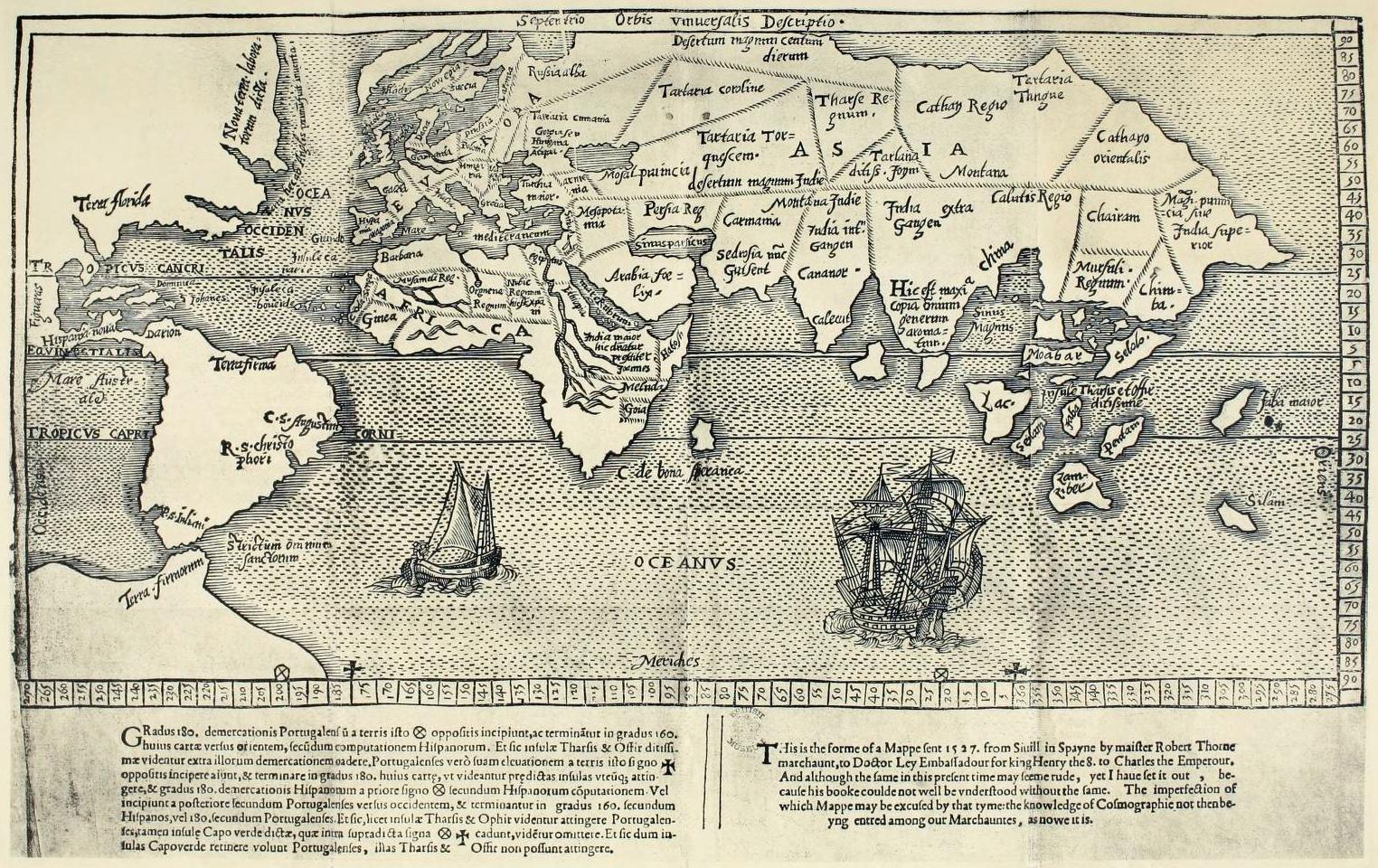
World map sent by Robert Thorne in 1527 from Seville to the English ambassador in Spain arguing for a route from England to the Spice Islands via the North Pole. This version was published in 1582.

John Rut (fl. 1512 – 1528) was an English mariner, born in Essex, who was chosen by Henry VIII to command an expedition to North America in search of the Northwest Passage. On 10 June 1527 he set sail from Plymouth with two ships, Samson and Mary Guilford. The voyage was arranged by Cardinal Wolsey at the wishes of Robert Thorne, a Bristol merchant. Samson was commanded by Master Grube and Mary Guilford was commanded by Rut.

During the voyage across the Atlantic Ocean, the ships separated during a storm, and it is assumed that Samson was lost. In early July Mary Guilford met heavy ice and turned southward; they reached the Labrador coast near St. Lewis Inlet, which they explored. In late July Mary Guilford set sail for St. John's. They entered St. John's harbour on 3 August where they reported encountering eleven Norman fishing vessels, one Breton fishing vessel and two from Portugal.

It was at St. John's, Newfoundland on 3 August 1527 that the first known letter in English was sent from North America. While in St. John's, Rut wrote to King Henry on his findings and his planned voyage southward to seek his fellow explorer. The letter in part reads:

Pleasing your Honourable Grace to heare of your servant John Rut with all his company here in good health thanks be to God.

…and concludes:

...the third day of August we entered into a good harbour called St. John and there we found Eleuen Saile of Normans and one Brittaine and two Portugal barks all a fishing and so we are ready to depart towards Cap de Bras that is 25 leagues as shortly as we have fished and so along the Coast until we may meete with our fellowe and so with all diligence that lyes in me toward parts to that Ilands that we are command at our departing and thus Jesu save and keepe you Honourable Grace and all your Honourable Reuer. In the Haven of St. John the third day of August written in hast 1527, by your servant John Rut to his uttermost of his power.

After leaving Newfoundland for warmer climes, Mary Guilford sailed along the east coast, past the Chesapeake Bay to Florida, apparently the first English ship to do so. Rut returned to England the following year; no further record of him remains.

== See also ==
- List of people of Newfoundland and Labrador
- List of communities in Newfoundland and Labrador
- Rut's voyage
