= Sanson =

Sanson may refer to:

== Places ==
- Sanson, New Zealand

== People ==
- Samson, biblical judge sometimes known as "Sansón"
- Sansón (wrestler) (born 1994), Mexican wrestler
- Audley Sanson (born 1974), Jamaican cricketer
- Boris Sanson (born 1980), French sabre fencer
- Charles-Henri Sanson (1739–1806), public executioner of France from 1788 to 1795
- Ernest Sanson (1836–1918), French architect
- Henry-Clément Sanson (1799-1889), Royal Executioner of Paris from 1840 to 1847
- Jean-Baptiste Sanson de Pongerville (1782–1870), French poet and member of the Académie française
- Morgan Sanson (born 1994), French footballer
- Nicolas Sanson (1600–1667), French cartographer
- Raoul Grimoin-Sanson (1860–1940), inventor in the field of early cinema
- Sansón (footballer) (1924-2012), Spanish footballer
- Véronique Sanson (born 1949), French singer-songwriter
- Yvonne Sanson (1926–2003), Italian film actress

== Characters ==
- Andre Sanson, a fictional privateer and antagonist in Michael Crichton's 2009 novel, Pirate Latitudes

== Other uses ==
- Sanson (cycling team), several teams
- Sanson Tramway, New Zealand
