= Sampson, Oconto County, Wisconsin =

Sampson, Wisconsin
- Unincorporated community
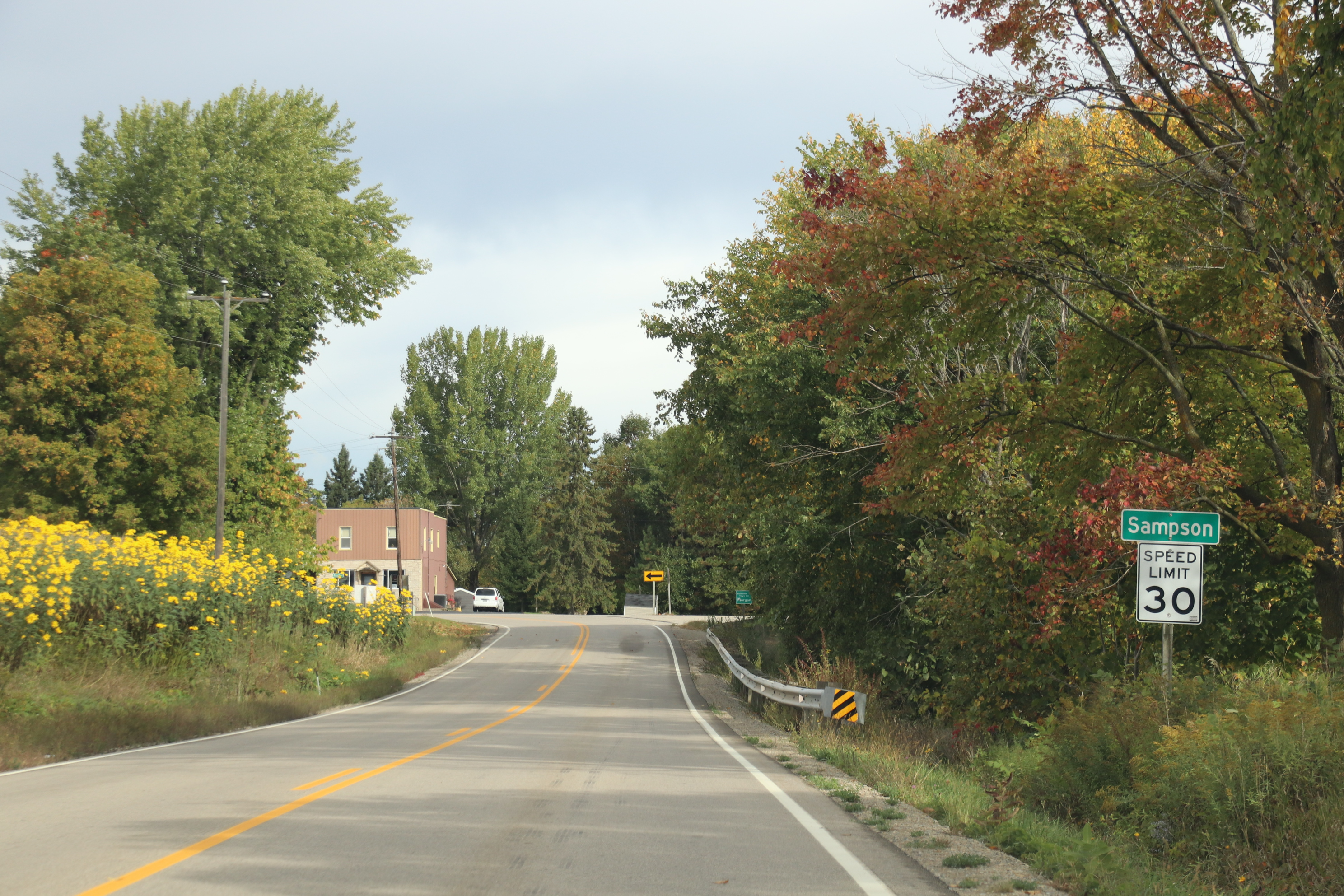
- Looking north at the welcome sign for Sampson

- Location within Wisconsin Location within the United States
- Coordinates: 44°45′54″N 88°11′10″W
- Country: United States
- State: Wisconsin
- County: Oconto
- Elevation: 787 ft (240 m)
- Time zone: UTC-6 (Central (CST))
  - Summer (DST): UTC-5 (CDT)
- Area code: 920
- GNIS feature ID: 1573644

Sampson is an unincorporated community in Oconto County, Wisconsin, United States. The community is located at the intersection of Oconto County Highways C and D, in the town of Morgan. It is located at latitude 44.765 and longitude -88.186 and elevation 787 feet (mean sea level). In the unincorporated limits there is The Hilltop Tavern, a county highway shop and Sampson Valley Vineyard. The town did have a post office from 1898 to 1909, when it was discontinued.

The land that comprises Sampson is the terminal moraine of the last glaciation. Over 200 feet of rich glacial till is present attracting over 1/2 dozen gravel operations supplying many concrete and road building companies.

== Images ==
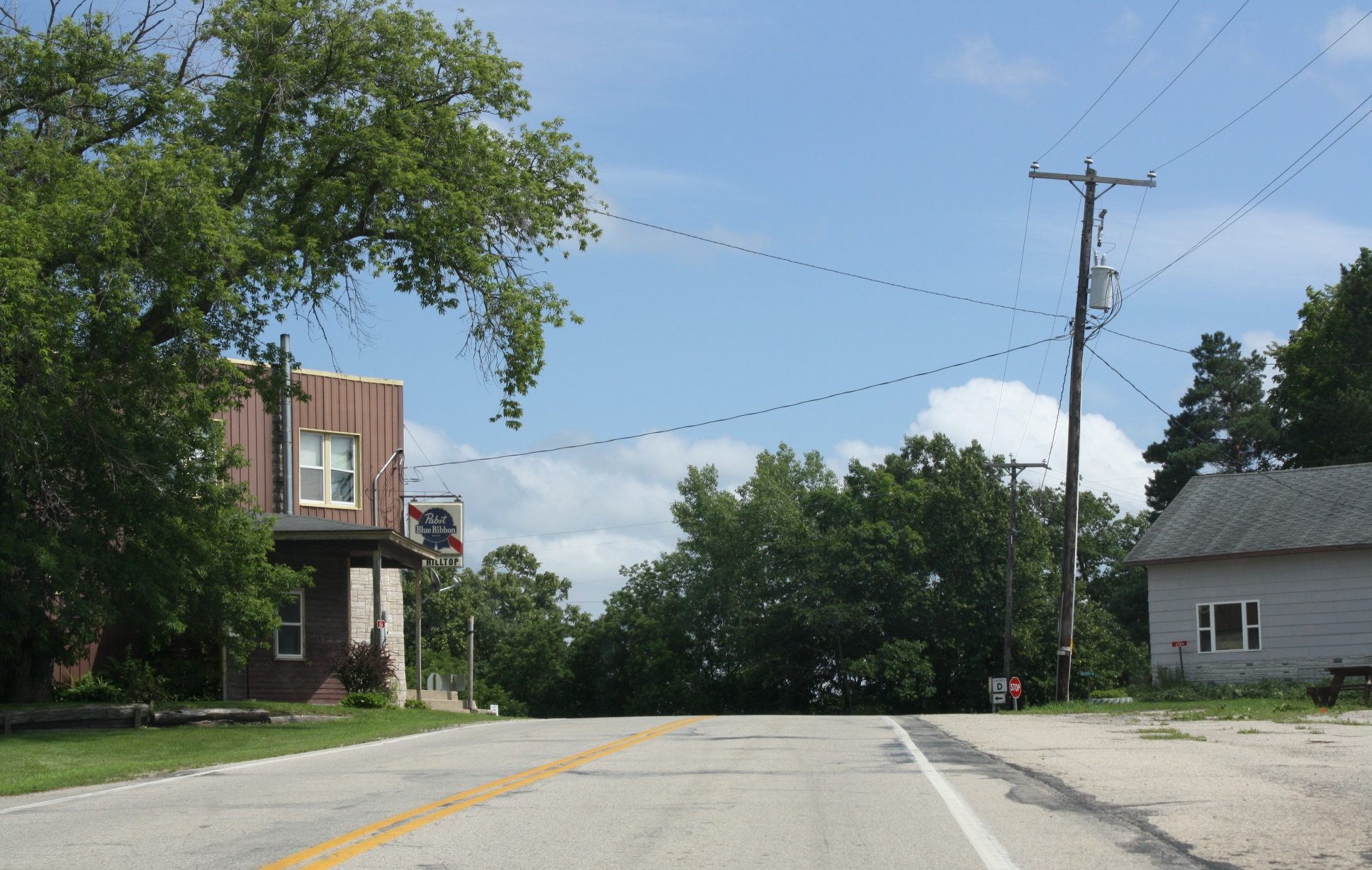
Looking south at downtown Sampson

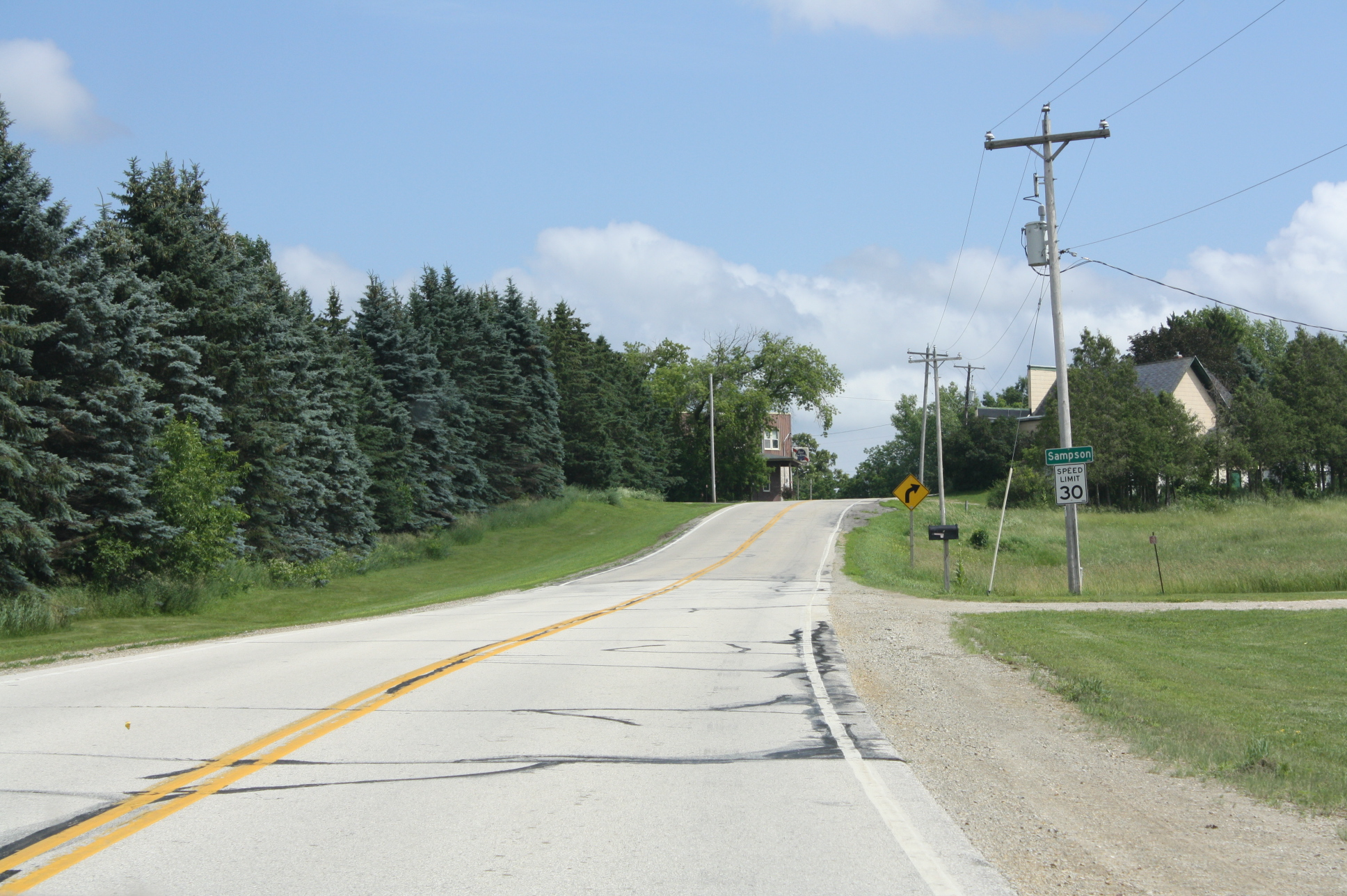
Looking south at the sign for Sampson

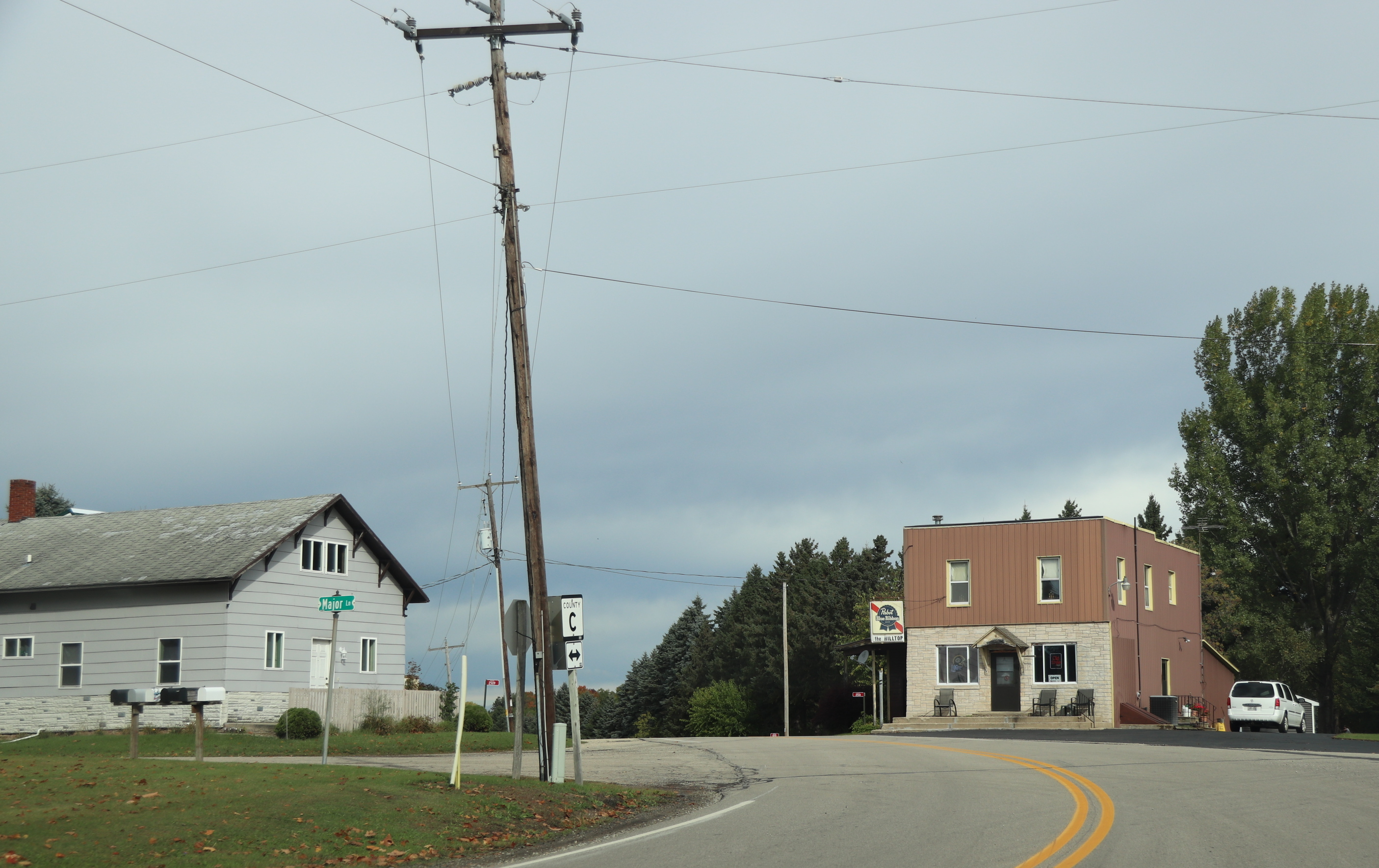
Looking north at downtown Sampson

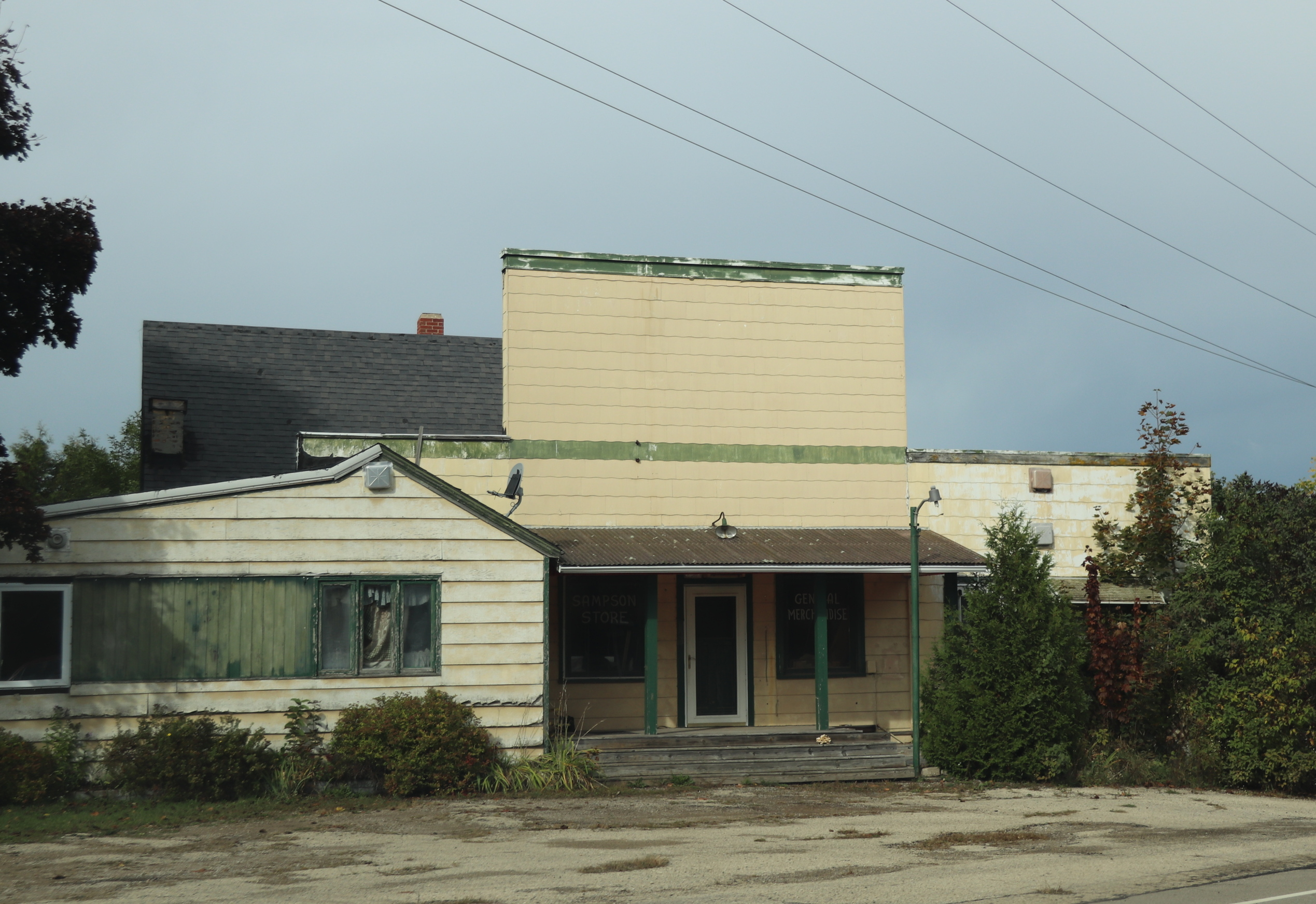
Former General Merchanise store
