= Saint-Samson =

Saint Samson, Saint-Samson, or Saint Sampson may refer to:

== People ==
- Saint Sampson the Hospitable (died c. 530), born in Rome, became a citizen of Constantinople and saint of the Eastern Churches
- Saint Samson of Dol (died 565), born in Wales, active there and in Brittany
- Saint Sampson Nikolaev Pan (died 1900), Orthodox Chinese martyr of the Boxer Rebellion, feast day June 11

== Places ==
Saint-Samson is the name or part of the name of several communes in northern France:

- Saint-Samson, Calvados, in the Calvados département
- Saint-Samson, Mayenne, in the Mayenne département
- Saint-Samson-de-Bonfossé, in the Manche département
- Saint-Samson-de-la-Roque, in the Eure département
- Saint-Samson-la-Poterie, in the Oise département
- Saint-Samson-sur-Rance, in the Côtes-d'Armor département
- La Ferté-Saint-Samson, in the Seine-Maritime département

Saint Sampson is the name of several places (these three named after St Samson of Dol):

- Saint Sampson, Guernsey, a parish of Guernsey
- St Sampson, Cornwall, a parish in Cornwall
- Saint-Samson de Dol, a cathedral in Dol-de-Bretagne
