= South Carver, Massachusetts =

Village in Massachusetts, United States

Coordinates: 41°50′26″N 70°44′48″W

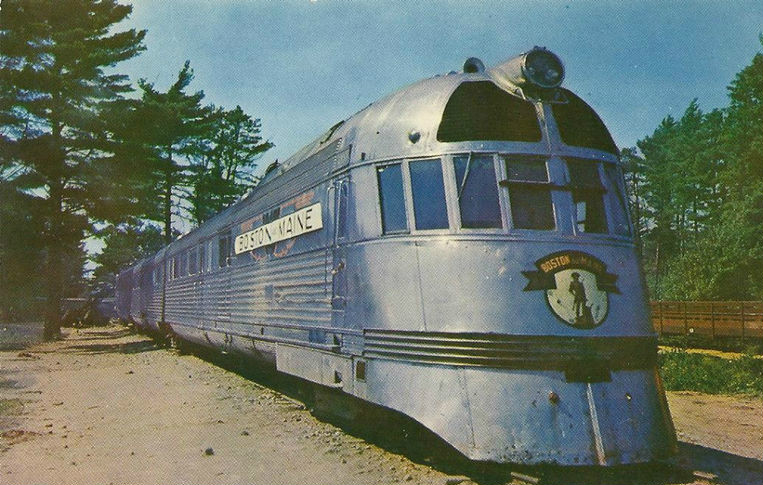
Flying Yankee, Edaville

South Carver is a village in the town of Carver, Plymouth County, Massachusetts, United States.

South Carver is the location of the main entrance to the Myles Standish State Forest and of the Edaville Railroad and King Richard's Faire. The cultivation and processing of cranberries is the predominant economic activity in South Carver.

The ZIP code for South Carver is 02366, but South Carver also uses Carver's 02330.
