= Érdy-codex =

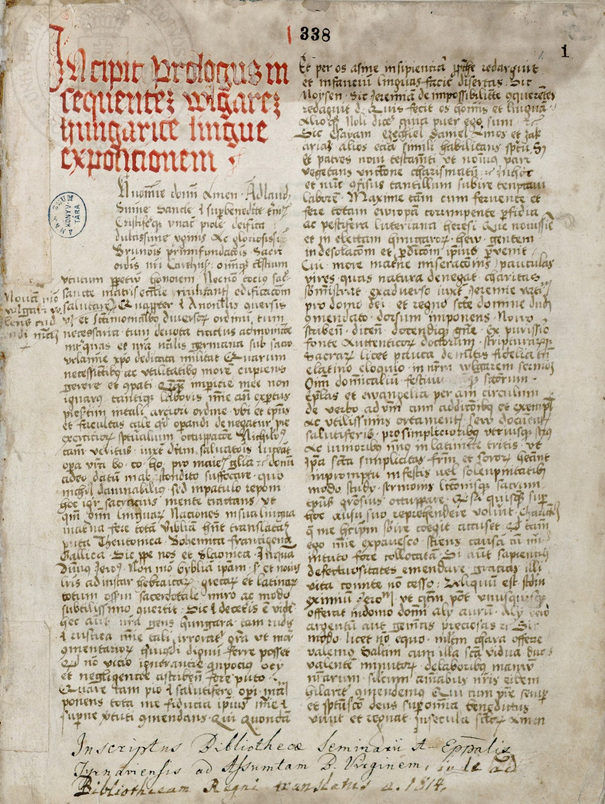
First letter of Érdy Codex

The Érdy Codex is the largest collection of Hungarian legends, and the greatest volume of Hungarian language literature in history.

It is a middle-sized folio paper codex written mostly with running letters, while at some parts, especially in capitals, and in epistolas it is in printed capital letters. The codex was written by one author, probably a Carthusian monk, who finished his work on 23 November 1527, the day of Saint Clement, according to the last page. The place of its origin and early owners are unknown. In the 17th century it was the property of the Seminary of Nagyszombat (today: Trnava, Slovakia), whence through abbot Ferenc Stipsics, it was moved to the library of the Hungarian National Museum in 1814. It is now kept at the National Széchényi Library.

The content of the work is sermons for the whole year; additionally in one part it contains the legends of ninety most important Saints. It also lists Saints of the Hungarian history, namely St Stephen, St Ladislaus, St Emeric, St. Elisabeth, St Gellert, etc.

The codex itself was based on Latin works of Pelbart of Temesvár from the 15th century.

The name was given to it by Ferenc Toldy in honour of its first editor, János Érdy.

== Sources ==
- Gyula Zolnai: Nyelvemlékeink a könyvnyomtatás koráig (Budapest, 1894) (Our language heritage before the age of printing)
