= Samson and Delilah (van Dyck, Vienna) =

1630 painting by Anthony van Dyck

- The Capture of Samson
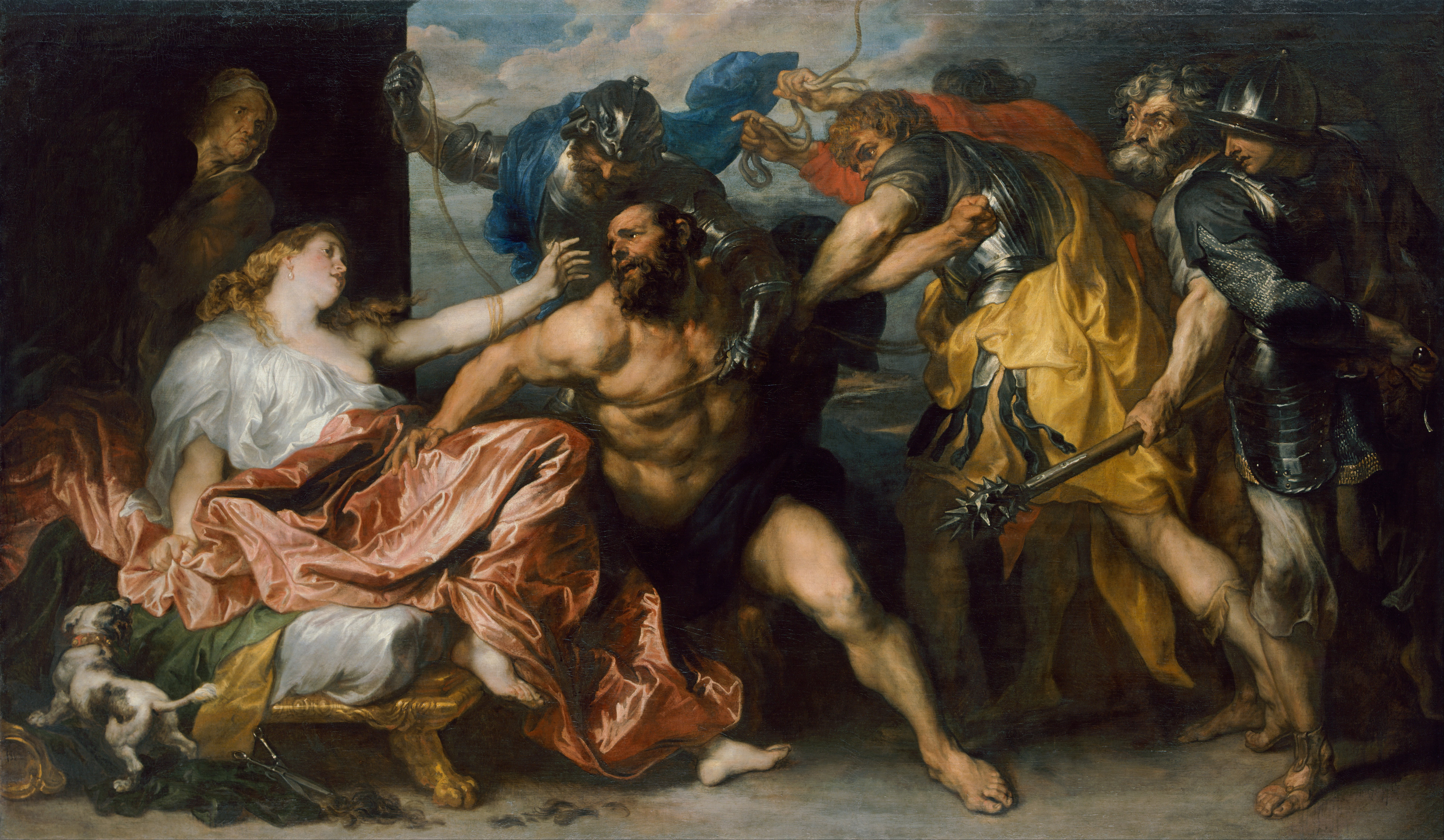
- Artist: Anthony van Dyck
- Year: 1630
- Medium: Oil on canvas
- Dimensions: 254 cm × 146 cm (100 in × 57 in)
- Location: Kunsthistorisches Museum, Vienna

Samson and Delilah is a 1630 painting by Anthony van Dyck. Like his 1620 version of the subject, it is in the style of his former master Peter Paul Rubens. Unlike Rubens, however, van Dyck shows Delilah seemingly appalled at her own betrayal of Samson and regretting her act of treason, whereas Rubens showed him as a captive and her as an unscrupulous temptress. Van Dyck's palette in the work also reveals the influence of Titian during van Dyck's stay in Italy. It is now in the Kunsthistorisches Museum in Vienna.

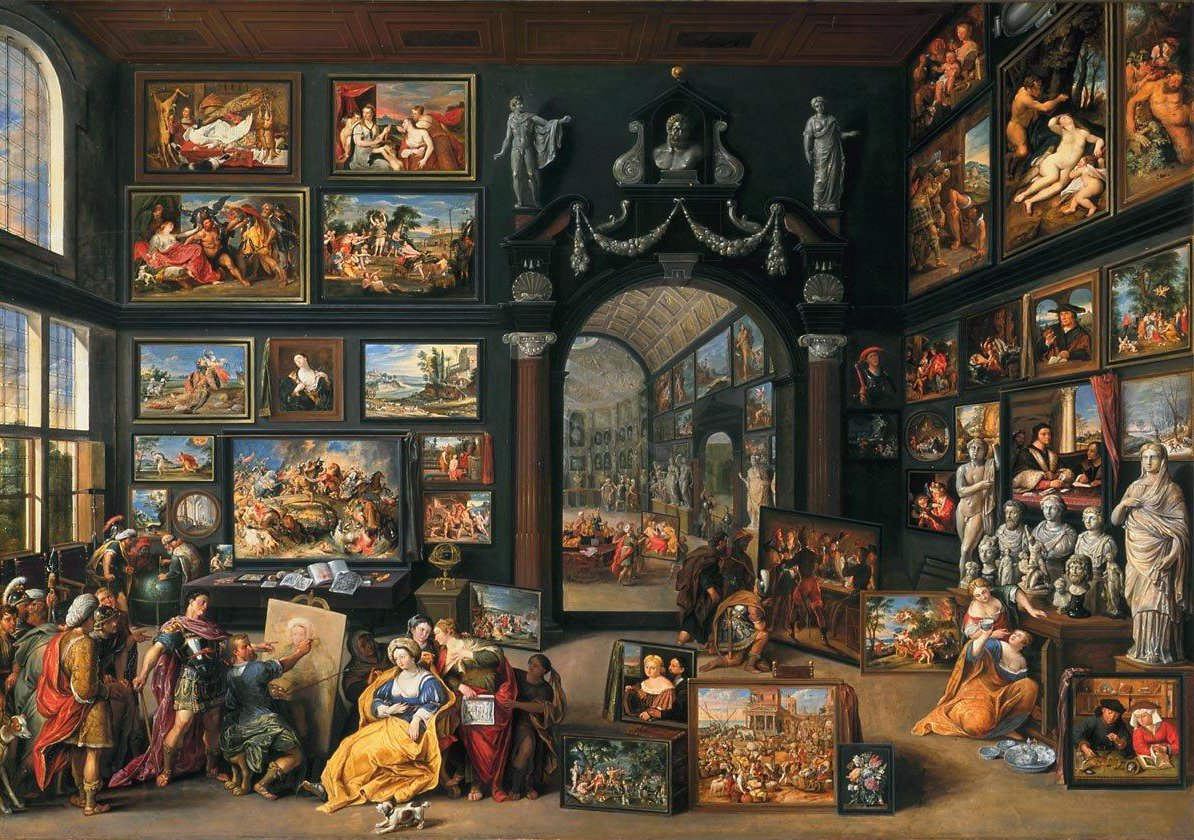
The Gallery of Cornelis van der Geest, by Willem van Haecht shows this painting hanging on the rear wall.

== See also ==
- 100 Great Paintings, 1980 BBC series
- List of paintings by Anthony van Dyck
