= Anna Swenonis =

Swedish artist (died 1527)

Anna Swenonis (died 31 July 1527) was a Swedish manuscript illuminator.

She was a nun of the Bridgettine order in the Vadstena Abbey from 1478, and served as a prioress for a time.

She is known as the author of the manuscripts known as AM 422 and Ups C 475. She is pointed out as the artist of the illuminated manuscript known as a copy of the Prayer book of Ingegerd Ambjörnsdotter from 1501–1527, which is now kept as the National Library of Sweden.
