= Samson and Delilah (van Dyck, London) =

Painting by Anthony van Dyck

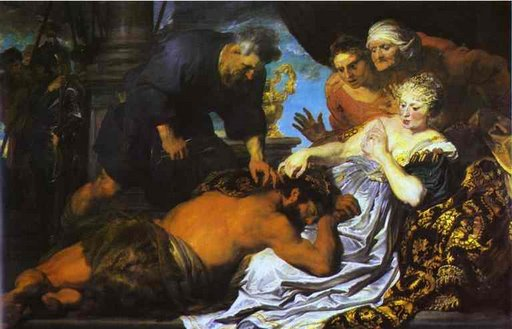
Samson and Delilah (1620) by Anthony van Dyck

Samson and Delilah is a 1620 painting by Anthony van Dyck.It was heavily inspired by his tutor Rubens's version of the same subject and for a long time was attributed to Rubens. Van Dyck inverted the composition and showed Delilah in white chalk make-up and heavily rouged cheeks, the makeup traditionally worn by Parisian prostitutes. The painting is now held in the Dulwich Picture Gallery in London. He returned to the subject in 1630.

== See also ==
- List of paintings by Anthony van Dyck

== Bibliography ==
- Beatrice Marshall, Old Blackfriars: A Story of the Days of Anthony Van Dyck (1901), Kessinger Publishing, 2009
