= Rut's voyage =

English maritime voyage, 1527–1528

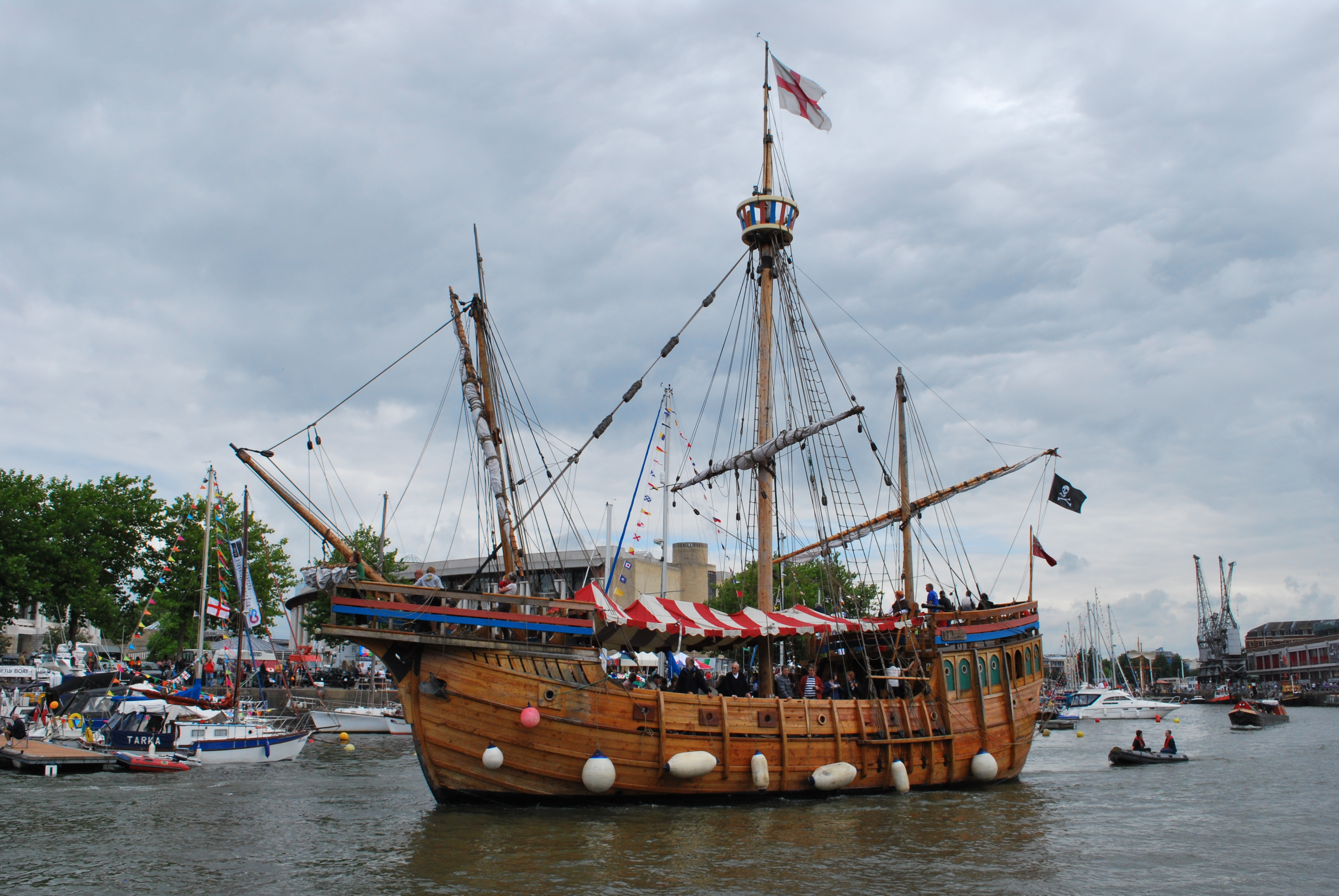
- Late 1490s English caravel (modern replica of John Cabot's Matthew shown)
- Sponsor: Henry VIII
- Country: England
- Leader: John Rut
- Start: Plymouth; 10 June 1527
- End: England; March–September 1528
- Goal: To discover the Northwest Passage; To explore or trade in new lands
- Ships: Mary Guildford (Note: Also Mary of Guildford, and Guilford for Guildford. A ship of 160 tons, built in 1524, Rut master, Albert de Prato pilot.); Sampson (Note: Also Samson. A ship with Grube master.)
- Crew: c. 70 men (Note: For the Mary only.)
- Fatalities: all Sampson crew (Note: Presumed dead upon going missing at sea.); 1 Mary pilot (Note: Possibly killed by Indians at some landing.); some Mary crew (Note: Died of exposure.)
- Achievements: First English voyage to the West Indies (Note: Contested in.); First English letter from North America

Rut's voyage was an English maritime expedition of exploration to Northern America and the West Indies in 1527 to 1528, led by John Rut and commissioned by Henry VIII. The trip failed to meet its main objective, the discovery of the Northwest Passage, and incurred the loss of a ship, along with that of her crew. It went largely unnoticed in England, but not in Spain, where the political scandal that resulted from Rut's welcome in Santo Domingo and Puerto Rico prompted Charles I to formally bar Englishmen from entry to Spanish America. The trip is noted as the earliest such by English sailors to the Caribbean, and as the first known instance of a letter written in English and posted from North America.

The West Indian leg of Rut's voyage has been debated in literature since the early 20th century, as English records on the trip are spotty, whereas Spanish ones do not explicitly name Rut as the English captain who visited Spanish ports in the region. Most historians now, however, do count the leg as part of the said expedition.

== Background ==
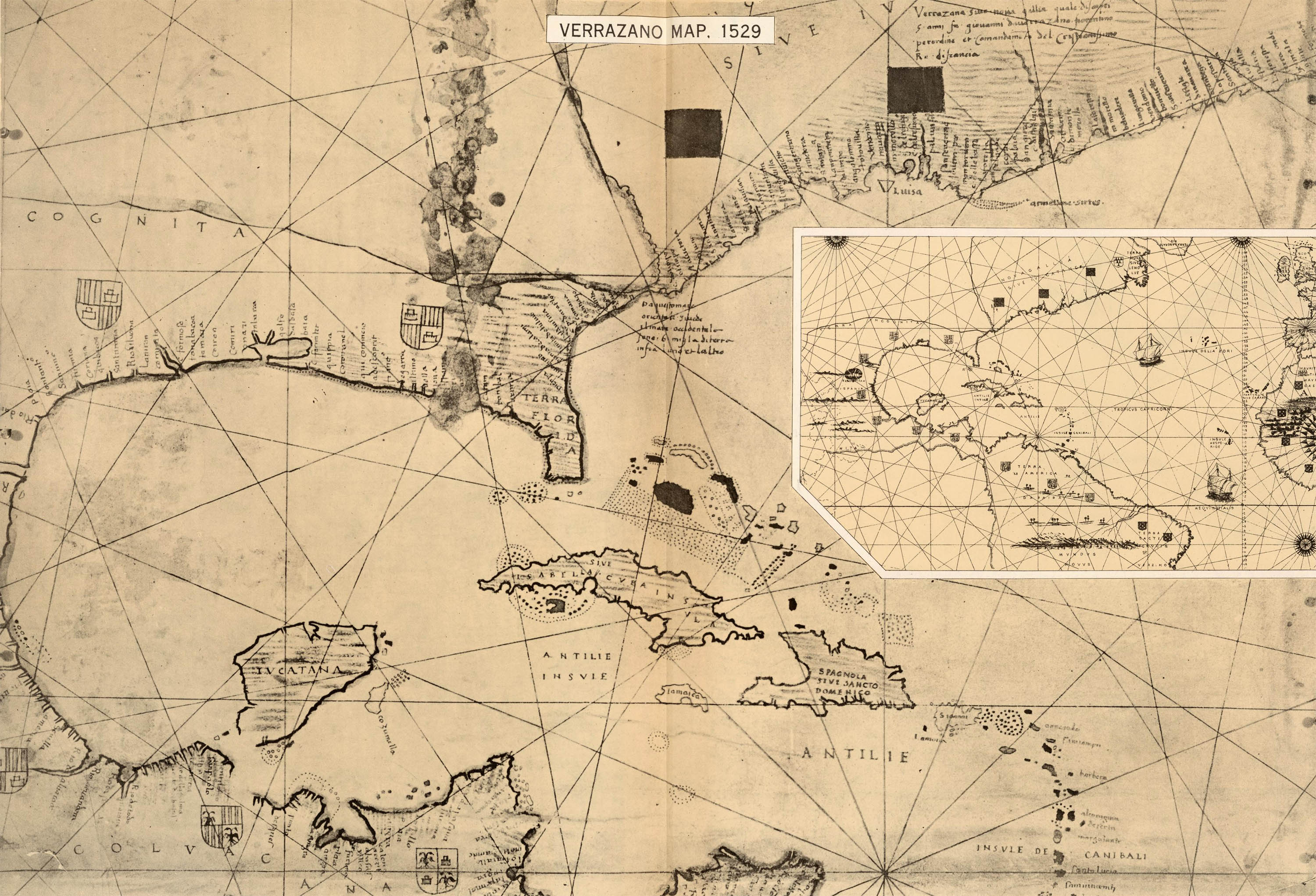
Verrazzano's map may have helped persuade Henry VIII to sponsor Rut's voyage in early 1527 (late 1520s or 1530s copy by Verrazzano's brother shown)

In 1525, Florentine explorer Giovanni da Verrazzano, fresh off a "very successful" French-sponsored expedition to Northern America the year prior, presented himself before Henry VIII, seeking the sovereign's patronage, and gifted him with a map and globe which depicted his recent discoveries. This gave the English crown access to what American historian Lydia Towns described as "one of the earliest, most accurate representations of North America" in the 1520s. Verrazzano's map depicted an inland sea which the explorer identified as their best guess for the location of the shortest maritime route to Cathay, which is to say, the Northwest Passage. According to Towns, this meeting and the said map "had a dramatic impact in England, shaping much of England's cartographic understanding of North America for the next century", and is what prompted the English monarch to sponsor an expedition in search of the promised passage, and purportedly even to personally get involved in some of the trip's preparations.

Henry VIII is, however, traditionally said to have commissioned the trip upon receiving a letter from cartographer Robert Thorne, dated Seville, 1527. In his 1613 Purchas His Pilgrimage, clergyman Samuel Purchas contended that the missive had moved the king "to send forth two ships for the discovery, one of which perished in the North parts of New-found Land". But some historians now regard this as apocryphal, given that there would not have been "enough time for this letter to be written in Seville in 1527 and then delivered to Henry in time for Rut's expedition to be organised" (in Towns's words).

Whatever the case, preparations for the voyage were well underway by March or April of that year. They counted with the participation of cardinal Thomas Wolsey, and ostensibly (according to contemporary rumours) involved "a significant number of soldiers". Within a month or two, mariner John Rut had been given command, the crew contracted, and the ships Mary Guildford (160 ton, Rut master) and Sampson (Grube master) outfitted and victualled for the crossing. The fleet departed from London on 10 May, and put out to open ocean from Plymouth on 10 June 1527..

== Voyage ==
Rut's route (Note: Possible or presumed route. Stops at Cape St Charles (3) and Ayllon's colony (4) are especially tentative.)
1 53° N
2 Cape St Charles
3 Cape Spear
4 Ayllon's colony
5 Mona Island
6 Santo Domingo
7 San Juan

Mary Guildford and Sampson had fair sailing out west from Plymouth until 1 July, when they came upon "a marvailous great storme, and much foule weather" which led to the former's being separated from the latter. Rut weathered the storm and carried on though, sighting icebergs at 53º N, (Note: But in: historical "sources are corrupt and give figures as varied as 53º (perhaps for 58º) and 64º for the most northerly latitude she [Mary Guildford] reached".)` possibly in the ice floe-ridden Labrador Sea between Greenland and Labrador, on 3 July. Here, the captain determined that the Arctic ice pack would make for too treacherous a crossing, and so veered south instead.

Mary Guildford reached 52º N four days later, and was steered to some nearby headland known as Cape de Bas, later described by Rut as having "a good Harbor, and many small ilands, and a great fresh river going up farre into the mayne Land", and tentatively identified by Irish historian David Beers Quinn as Cape St Charles. The crew stopped in this harbour to replenish their water and provisions, and after ten days, sailed Mary Guildford south to Cape Spear, near modern St John's, Newfoundland, (Note: Fishing grounds back then.) as this was a well-known sea mark at the time, and had prior been designated as a rendezvous point should either Mary Guildford or Sampson lose sight of each other during their transatlantic crossing.

Mary Guildford sighted Cape Spear on 3 August, off which were "eleven saile of Normans, and one Brittaine, and two Portugall Barkes" fishing, according to a later report by Rut. The captain did not find Sampson here, and after spending some time without further news from her, determined that she had most likely been lost at sea, in which case he decided to depart and set course "toward parts to that Ilands that we are commanded by the grace of God, as we were commanded at our departing". What parts or islands this meant, however, is unclear, as from this point onwards, the expedition "becomes shrouded in mystery", given that no records on the remaining itinerary survive. That said, in late 1527, an unidentified English ship arrived in the West Indies. Her unnamed crew described to Spanish authorities a voyage similar to that of Rut's up to early August 1527, further adding that they had sailed down from Newfoundland "for some 400 leagues and more along the coast of the new land where Ayllon took his colony", and then crossed into the Caribbean Sea.

=== West Indies ===
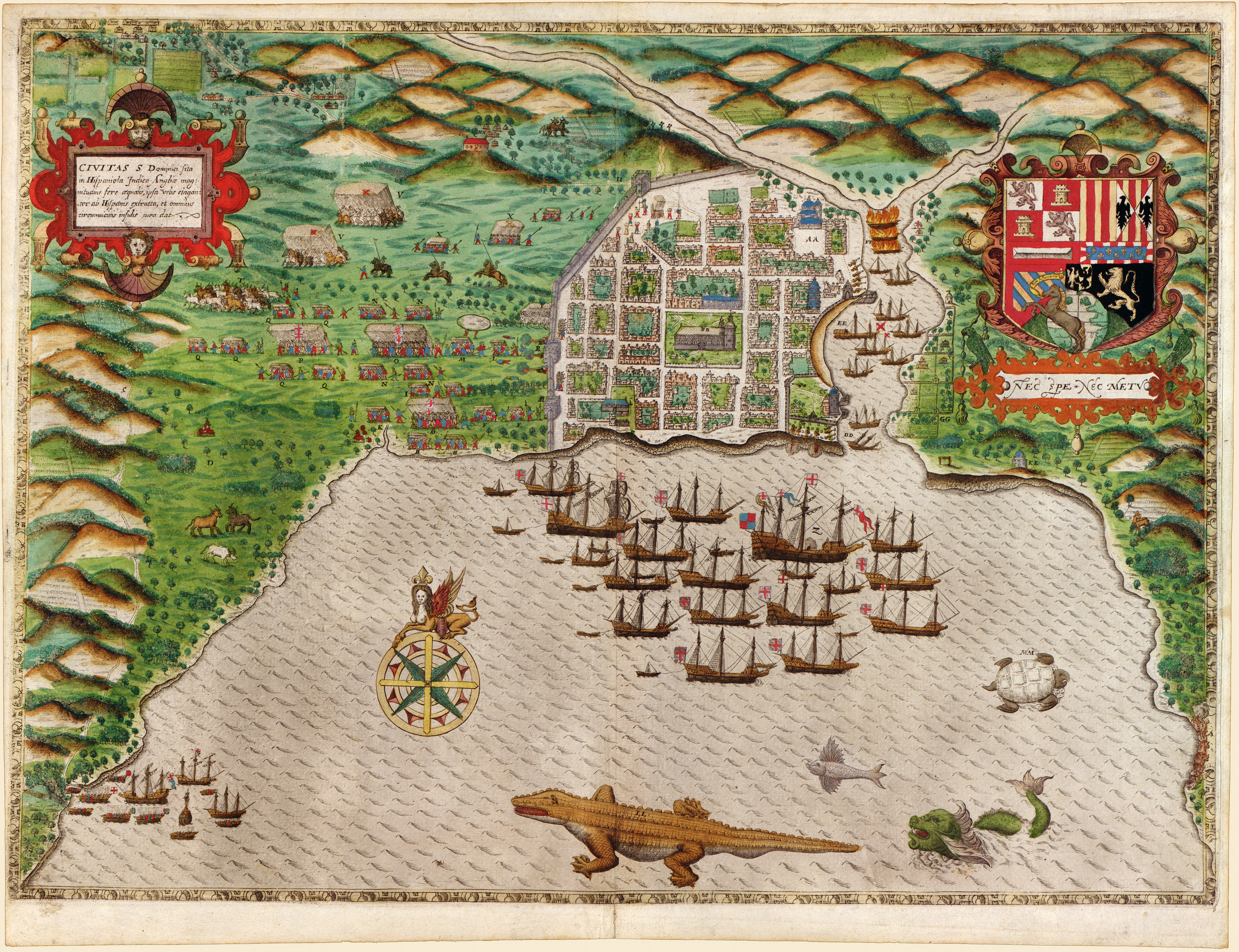
Santo Domingo port (Rio Ozama in top right) and harbour (bottom) in the 1580s

San Juan Bay in the 1660s; shows the town market and harbour (off centre, labelled 8–9)

On 19 November 1527, a ship of some 250 tons and three maintops sighted Mona Island, situated between the Spanish territories of Santo Domingo and Puerto Rico, part of the Spanish West Indies. She was soon spotted from said island by Gines Navarro, a Spanish merchant who found himself loading cassava onto a caravel at the time. The unidentified ship's crew had evidently also spotted Navarro, as a pinnace was next despatched to his location. The merchant received the island's newcomers, but to his great surprise, they turned out to be Englishmen, who were unheard of in the West Indies then. As both parties knew that this was so, the English crew gave Navarro an account of why they were there, saying that they intended to find the land of the Great Khan, and describing a trip akin to Rut's above. Not yet convinced by their story, the merchant pressed further as to their intentions in Spanish territory, whereupon the men reportedly admitted that they "wished to examine them in order to give the king of England an account thereof", adding that "when they had explored them, they would take a load of brazilwood and return home". The Englishmen rested for a day on the island, and then set sail for Hispaniola on 20 November.

The English vessel sighted the harbour of Santo Domingo on 25 November, after which the ship's master and 10 or 12 crewmen took a boat into port and were received by members of the city's cabildo. Now, the men stated that they were on a voyage to "make a certain exploration toward the north, between Labrador and Newfoundland, in the belief that in that region there was a strait through which to pass to Tartary", adding that they had called at their present port only to take in water and provisions. The Spanish officials were apparently convinced by this account, and so gave the English leave to revictual. In addition, alguacil mayor ('high sheriff') Diego Mendez and two pilots, Antonio Martina and Pedro Montiel, made themselves available to guide the men's ship into harbour, but a strong north wind prevented this, so the vessel remained anchored outside that night.

On the morning of 26 November, as the English crew broke fast over a Spanish meal, a round shot was fired from Fort Ozama, and landed some twenty fathoms over the ship's poop deck. Francisco de Tapia, warden of the said fort, had heard that an English ship was trying to enter harbour, and having tried but failed to secure direction from the city's cabildo and leading vecinos, had fired a small loaded cannon to take cognisance of the vessel. The crew, of course, knew nothing of this, and rather thought that the Spanish had aimed for their ship and simply missed. The English captain was spooked, thinking a plot was afoot to betray them despite Spanish assurances to the contrary, and so quickly weighed anchor and set out due east.

The English sailors were next heard of in San Juan, Puerto Rico, where they "had speech with the people of that town and begged for provisions, complaining of the people of [Santo Domingo,] saying that they came not to annoy but to treat with their money and merchandise, if they [San Juan] would receive them". Here again, the crew were obliged without apparent hostility, and bartered pewter and other goods in exchange for provisions. They were soon fully restocked, and so left the port, apparently bound for England by late November 1527.

As mentioned above, there are no surviving records which detail Rut's return, but the seafarer is next heard of captaining Mary Guildford in the third quarter of 1528. According to Towns and Quinn, who both identify the aforesaid English ship (unnamed) as Rut's, a mid to late November 1527 departure from the Caribbean would have had Mary Guildford reach England by early to mid March 1528, or else sometime during the second or third quarter of that year.

== Aftermath ==
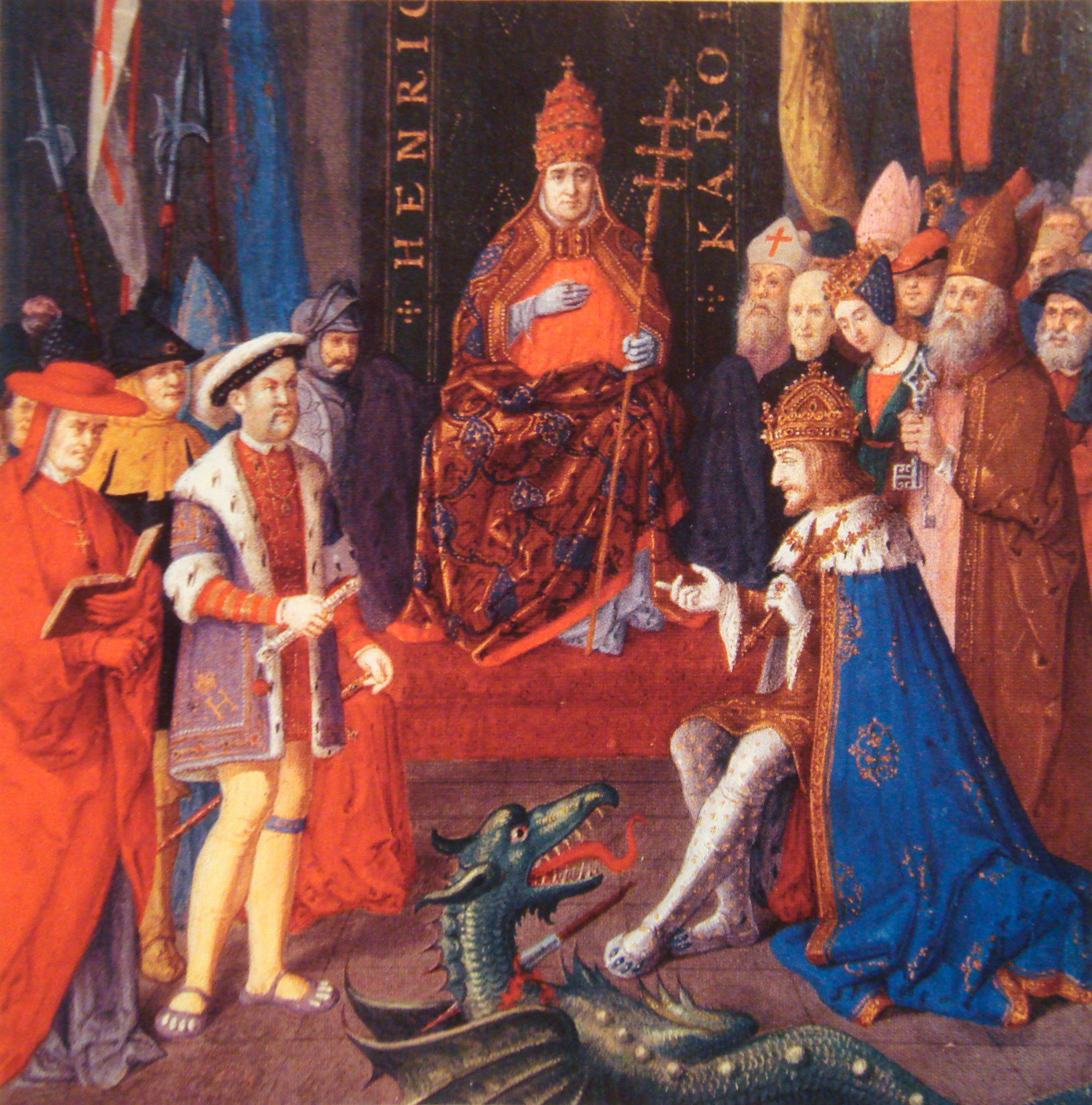
Strained relations between Henry VIII (left) and Charles I (right) in the 1520s may have led to a frosty reception for Rut on his return, whereas the latter king formally barred Englishmen from Spanish America after Rut's voyage

In England, Rut's voyage sparked little interest or debate upon his return, a result which Towns reckons may have been due to "England's tenuous political relations with the Holy Roman Empire, and thus with Spain". Rut is thought to have received an annuity of £10 (worth some £4,410 today) for having led the expedition, and to have rejoined the King's Navy as master of the Mary Guildford, which he had first captained in 1526.

In Spain, on the other hand, the "presence of an English ship suddenly in the heart of the Spanish New World created political turmoil", it seeming an "obvious violation" yet not, at the time, being expressly forbidden in law or policy. In Santo Domingo, cabildo members were deposed in late 1527, and their accounts prompty forwarded to the Spanish court in Madrid, which got them on 11 March 1528. On learning of the affair, Charles I censured the Real Audiencia of Santo Domingo for their failure to detain the Englishmen "after they had landed and visited the city, and seen how it lies, and its harbour, inasmuch as they were from a foreign kingdom, and this was a thing not heretofore experienced in those parts", and further charged them with "great carelessness and negligence" for having granted the said English free movement in Spanish waters. The scandal prompted the Spanish crown to provide their colonies "clear directives on how to deal with such incursions". Consequently, when Englishmen next appeared in the West Indies, their reception was vastly different to Rut's. This was the case, for instance, in Santo Domingo, where some two decades after Rut's call, some English crewmen were detained and their ships boarded and searched, with Spanish port authorities now "able to quote laws to warrant their arrest and laws which clearly allowed for the seizure of their goods". In Towns's estimation, then, Rut's voyage "had a dramatic impact on the [Spanish] empire, both in policy and in memory".

== Legacy ==
Rut's letter to Henry VIII from St John's (bay shown, with Cape Spear in back) may have been the first English letter from North America

The identity of the unnamed English ship sighted by Navarro "has been hotly contested by historians for decades". The said Navarro account was first discussed in scholarship in a 1905 English Historical Review paper by Frederick Alexander Kirkpatrick, who proposed that it had not been Rut's Mary Guildford, given that Richard Hakluyt had dated her return to England in October 1527. American historian Irene A. Wright, on the other hand, questioned the reliability of Hakluyt's date, and so advanced the theory that it had been the Mary. Towns follows Wright, adding that Hakluyt's account of Rut's voyage "is sketchy at best" as said writer "only found information [on it] through third hand accounts ... close to sixty years after the fact, and includes key mistakes". Like Towns, a number of later historians have followed Wright in identifying the ship in question as the Mary, with Quinn noting that the odds "seem so high that the identification appears fully acceptable".

In Quinn's estimation, Rut's voyage was "the most important English expedition to North America during the reign of Henry VIII". To American historian Samuel Eliot Morison, it had rather been "a complete failure", and similarly, to English historian James Williamson, it amounted to "little more than a pleasure cruise to the West Indies". Towns seemingly summarised the state of scholarship by observing that Rut's trip, together with those by John Rastell in 1519 and Richard Hore in 1539, formed a group of expeditions which had all been "acknowledged by historians of English exploration and discovery, but have remained all but forgotten due to the misperception that these voyages are unimportant to the larger narrative because they did not achieve their expressed purpose of permanent settlement, or new cartographic images and geographic discoveries".

The letter penned by John Rut for Henry VIII from St John's is thought to have been the earliest English letter sent from North America.

== See also ==
- Drake's expedition – first English cruise to westernmost West Indies
- England in the Age of Discovery
- European exploration of North America

== Notes and references ==
=== References ===
1. Allen JL (1992). "From Cabot to Cartier: The Early Exploration of Eastern North America, 1497–1543". Annals of the Association of American Geographers. 82 (3): 500–521. doi:10.1111/j.1467-8306.1992.tb01972.x.
2. CTROL (3 August 2021). "August 3, 1527 – The First Known Letter from North America is Sent by John Rut while at St. John's, Newfoundland". CTROL Blog (Blog). Roanoke, Virginia: Center for Teaching the Rule of Law. Archived from the original on 5 December 2023.
3. Dohey L (4 August 2016). "The First Letter from North America". Archival Moments (Blog). St John's, Newfoundland: Larry Dohey. Archived from the original on 22 September 2023.
4. Hower JS (2020). Hower JS (ed.). Tudor Empire: The Making of Early Modern Britain and the British Atlantic World, 1485–1603. Britain and the World. Cham: Palgrave Macmillan. doi:10.1007/978-3-030-62892-5. ISBN 978-3-030-62892-5.
5. Kirkpatrick FA (1905). "The First Recorded English Voyage to the West Indies". English Historical Review. 20 (77): 115–124. JSTOR 549175.
6. Quinn DB (1979a) [First published 1966 by UTP]. "Rut, John". In Brown GW (ed.). 1000–1700. Dictionary of Canadian Biography. Vol. 1 (revised ed.). Toronto: University of Toronto Press.
7. Quinn DB, ed. (1979b). America from Concept to Discovery: Early Exploration of North America. New American World: A Documentary History of North America to 1612. Vol. 1. New York: Arno Press. ISBN 0-405-10759-5. OCLC 3362188.
8. Towns L (2019). The Opening of the Atlantic World: England's Transatlantic Interests During the Reign of Henry VIII (DPhil thesis). Arlington, Texas: University of Texas. hdl:10106/28155. ProQuest 27630516.
9. Williamson JA (1929). The Voyages of the Cabots and the English Discovery of North America under Henry VII and Henry VIII. London: Argonaut Press. LCCN 30008622. OL 6740664M.
