= Exsurge Domine =

1520 papal bull by Pope Leo X in response to Martin Luther's 95 Theses

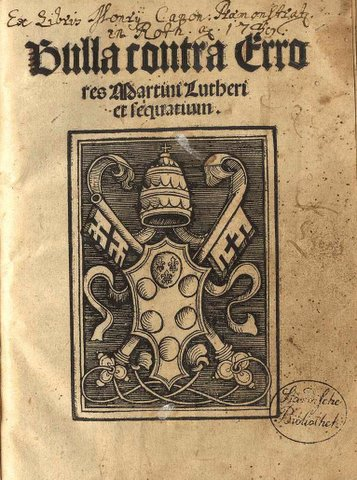
Title page of first printed edition of Exsurge Domine. The Latin printed text reads: Bulla contra Errores Martini Lutheri et sequacium (lit. 'Bull against the Errors of Martin Luther and his followers').

Exsurge Domine (Latin for 'Arise, O Lord') is a papal bull that was promulgated on 15 June 1520 by Pope Leo X. It was written in response to Martin Luther's Ninety-five Theses, which criticised various practices of the Catholic Church. The bull censured forty-one teachings found in the Ninety-five theses and Luther’s other writings. The bull also threatened Luther and his colleagues—one being Andreas Karlstadt—with excommunication unless they recanted their teachings sixty days after the publication of the bull in the Electorate of Saxony—now Saxony, Germany—and its neighboring regions.

Both theologians refused to recant, and Luther responded instead by composing polemical tracts rebuking the papacy and publicly burning a copy of Exsurge Domine on 10 December 1520 at the Elster Gate in Wittenberg. As a result, Pope Leo X promulgated the papal bull Decet Romanum Pontificem on 3 January 1521, excommunicating both theologians.

== History ==
The historical impetus for this bull arose from an effort to provide a decisive papal response to the growing popularity of Luther's teachings. Beginning in January 1520, a papal consistory was summoned to examine Luther's fidelity to Catholic teachings. After a short time, it produced a hasty list of several perceived errors found in his writings, but Curial officials believed that a more thorough consideration was warranted. The committee was reorganized and subsequently produced a report determining that only a few of Luther's teachings could potentially be deemed heretical or erroneous from the standpoint of Catholic theology. His other teachings perceived as problematic were deemed to warrant lesser degrees of theological censure, including the designations "scandalous" or "offensive to pious ears". (Note: Catholicism has traditionally recognized several degrees of theological censure. According to Catholic Encyclopedia, "A proposition is branded heretical when it goes directly and immediately against a revealed or defined dogma, or dogma de fide." An erroneous proposition "contradicts only a certain theological conclusion or truth clearly deduced from two premises, one an article of faith, the other naturally certain." The Magisterium may also apply censures of lesser gravity to other propositions that are inherently neither heretical nor erroneous. For example, a proposition may be deemed as "scandalous" or "offensive to pious ears" if it is worded in a manner that could lead to a scandalous interpretation or its "verbal expression is such as rightly to shock the Catholic sense and delicacy of faith.")

Johann Eck subsequently became involved in these proceedings. He had personally confronted Luther a year earlier in the Leipzig disputation and had obtained copies of condemnations issued against Luther by the universities of Cologne and Leuven. In a letter to a friend, Eck said he became involved because "no one else was sufficiently familiar with Luther's errors." Soon after having joined the committee when it was already halfway through its deliberations, he began to exert his considerable influence on the direction it subsequently took.

The committee on which Eck sat consisted of some forty members, including cardinals (among whom was Cardinal Cajetan), theologians and canon lawyers. The heads of the three major mendicant orders, the Dominicans, Franciscans and Augustinians, were represented. Central to the committee's proceedings was the matter of whether (and in what manner) Luther and his teachings should be formally condemned. Some members argued that Luther's popular support in Germany made it too politically risky to issue a bull at that time. The theologians supported an immediate condemnation of Luther. But the canon lawyers advocated a mediating position: Luther should be given a hearing and a chance to defend himself before being excommunicated as a heretic. Ultimately the committee negotiated a compromise. Luther would be given no hearing, but he would be offered a sixty-day window in which to repent before further action would be taken.

Prior to Eck's involvement, Cajetan had expressed his desire that the committee members examine the whole context of Luther's writings and specify careful distinctions among the various degrees of censure to be applied to Luther's teachings. Eck's approach was markedly different. He bulldozed a final decision through the committee to ensure a speedy publication. As a result, the text it ultimately drafted simply contained a list of various statements by Luther perceived as problematic. No attempt was made to provide specific responses to Luther's propositions based upon Scripture or Catholic tradition or any clarification of what degree of theological censure should be associated with each proposition listed. All quoted statements were to be condemned as a whole (in globo) as either heretical, scandalous, false, offensive to pious ears, or seductive of simple minds. Eck may have employed this tactic in order to associate more strongly the taint of error with all of Luther's censured teachings. However, this in globo formula for censure had already been employed by the earlier Council of Constance to condemn various propositions extracted from the writings of Jan Hus.

When the committee members had obtained agreement among themselves regarding the selection of forty-one propositions which they deemed to be problematic, they subsequently submitted their draft text to Leo X. He appended a preface and conclusion and issued the document as an official papal bull on 15 June 1520. Copies were printed, notarized, sealed and distributed to specially appointed papal nuncios who were tasked with disseminating the bull, especially in those regions where Luther's followers were most active, and ensuring that its instructions were carried out.

== Text ==
Printed copies of this bull bore the Latin title Bulla contra errores Martini Lutheri et sequacium ("Bull against the errors of Martin Luther and [his] followers"), but it is more commonly known by its Latin incipit, Exsurge Domine (Arise O Lord). These words (derived from Psalm 74:22) also serve to open a prefatory prayer within the text of the bull calling on the Lord to arise against the "foxes [that] have arisen seeking to destroy the vineyard" and the destructive "wild boar from the forest". Both refer to passages of the Bible: "Catch the foxes for us, The little foxes that are ruining the vineyards, While our vineyards are in blossom" (Song 2:15 NASB), and "A boar from the forest eats it away And whatever moves in the field feeds on it. O God of hosts, turn again now, we beseech You; Look down from heaven and see, and take care of this vine" (Ps 80:13–14 NASB). These poetic metaphors may also echo Leo X's sport in hunting wild boar at a lodge in the Italian hills in spring 1520.

Following additional prayers of intercession directed towards the Apostles Peter and Paul and the "whole church of the saints" to defend Catholicism against Luther, the bull proceeds to list the forty-one propositions previously selected by the committee. The condemned propositions do not cover all disputed points of doctrine advocated by Luther. Many of Luther's important works setting forth his disagreements with Catholic theology, including On the Babylonian Captivity of the Church, had not yet been published when this bull was issued. Moreover, on account of Eck's efforts to speed the committee along, it did not have sufficient opportunity to thoroughly examine the material Luther had already published. Therefore, the list of condemned propositions draws in large part upon the material with which Eck was personally familiar, including the 95 Theses, the lists of censures against Luther issued by the universities at Cologne and Leuven which Eck had brought with him to Rome, and Luther's Resolutiones (a detailed exposition of the 95 Theses). More than half of the forty-one censured propositions come from the 95 Theses or the Resolutiones; the larger part of the remainder are derived from the Leipzig debate. The selection of censures themselves in large part combines and amplifies those statements already selected as problematic by the universities of Cologne and Leuven.

Some of the condemnations confirmed prior judgments by the papacy. Luther's support for conciliarism is explicitly censured (proposition #28) and is singled out for further condemnation in the bull's conclusion: "[Luther] broke forth in a rash appeal to a future council. This to be sure was contrary to the constitution of Pius II (Note: Here Leo X alludes to Pope Pius II's bull Execrabilis promulgated in 1460.) and Pope Julius II our predecessors that all appealing in this way are to be punished with the penalties of heretics. In vain does he implore the help of a council, since he openly admits that he does not believe in a council." Other condemnations represent new papal interventions on matters that had been freely disputed among Catholic scholars and theologians before that time. For example, Luther's opposition to the burning of heretics (proposition #33) and his anti-war stance with respect to the Ottoman Turks (proposition #34) reflect opinions also shared by Desiderius Erasmus. Moreover, Luther explicitly referred to the church father Jerome for support when he opposed the practice of burning heretics.

Leo X then proceeded to issue an authoritative condemnation of these forty-one propositions in the following words:

With the advice and consent of these our venerable brothers, with mature deliberation on each and every one of the above theses, and by the authority of almighty God, the blessed Apostles Peter and Paul, and our own authority, we condemn, reprobate, and reject completely each of these theses or errors as either heretical, scandalous, false, offensive to pious ears or seductive of simple minds, and against Catholic truth. By listing them, we decree and declare that all the faithful of both sexes must regard them as condemned, reprobated, and rejected ... We restrain all in the virtue of holy obedience and under the penalty of an automatic major excommunication (Note: "Automatic major excommunication" translates the Latin expression majoris excommunicationis latae sententiae.)

Additionally, the bull contains a directive forbidding any use of Luther's works and decreeing that they should be burned:

[W]e likewise condemn, reprobate, and reject completely the books and all the writings and sermons of the said Martin, whether in Latin or any other language, containing the said errors or any one of them; and we wish them to be regarded as utterly condemned, reprobated, and rejected. We forbid each and every one of the faithful of either sex, in virtue of holy obedience and under the above penalties to be incurred automatically, to read, assert, preach, praise, print, publish, or defend them. ... Indeed immediately after the publication of this letter these works, wherever they may be, shall be sought out carefully by the ordinaries and others [ecclesiastics and regulars], and under each and every one of the above penalties shall be burned publicly and solemnly in the presence of the clerics and people.

Luther, along with his "supporters, adherents and accomplices", were given sixty days from the publication of this bull in which to desist "from preaching, both expounding their views and denouncing others, from publishing books and pamphlets concerning some or all of their errors". Luther himself was instructed to "inform us of such recantation through an open document, sealed by two prelates, which we should receive within another sixty days. Or he should personally, with safe conduct, inform us of his recantation by coming to Rome."

== Reactions ==
=== Luther and his sympathizers ===
The Pope assigned to Eck and Cardinal Girolamo Aleandro the task of publishing this bull in Saxony, its neighboring regions, and the Low Countries.

They found this task more difficult than had initially been anticipated on account of the widespread public support for Luther, particularly in Germany. At Erfurt, students who sympathized with Luther tossed copies of the bull into the local river and at Torgau, a posted copy was torn down and defaced. Even some Catholic bishops hesitated as much as six months before publishing the bull's contents. At times, the opposition faced by Eck and Aleandro was so fierce that their very lives were endangered. At Leipzig, Eck had to retreat for an hour to a cloister in fear for his life.

Eck found his task to be particularly onerous. He had received secret instructions permitting him to include more names under the bull's threat of excommunication at his discretion. This power he chose to exercise by supplementing the bull with the names of several prominent German Humanists and thereby aroused their opposition besides that of Luther's supporters. In the Netherlands, Aleandro also experienced his share of confrontations with Luther's sympathizers. Among those he encountered was Desiderus Erasmus, who declared: "The inclemency of the bull ill comports with the moderation of Leo" and also that "Papal bulls are weighty, but scholars attach much more weight to books with good arguments drawn from the testimony of divine Scripture, which does not coerce but instructs."

For these reasons, its dissemination took several months to complete. Luther himself received an official copy bearing the papal seal in early October of that year. However, rumors of its existence reached Luther well in advance of the official copy. At first he doubted their veracity and thought that the document to which they referred may be a forgery, possibly by Eck himself. Nonetheless he commented that it was the work of the Antichrist, whatever its true origin may be, and started to compose a response even before he had received an official copy. Because Luther and other Protestant reformers held the view that the Papacy itself is the Antichrist, his response was entitled Adversus Execrabile Antichristi Bullam (Against the Execrable Bull of the Antichrist).

Luther defiantly proclaimed in his response that "whoever wrote this bull, he is Antichrist. I protest before God, our Lord Jesus, his sacred angels and the whole world that with my whole heart I dissent from the damnation of this bull, that I curse and execrate it as sacrilege and blasphemy of Christ, God's Son and our Lord. This be my recantation, O bull, thou daughter of bulls." He subsequently took issue with the in globo censure of his statements: "My articles are called 'respectively some heretical, some erroneous, some scandalous', which is as much to say, 'We don't know which are which.' O meticulous ignorance! I want to be instructed, not respectively, but absolutely and certainly. [...] Let them show where I am a heretic, or dry up their spittle." Much of the remainder of the tract is devoted to a discussion of the censured propositions.

With the publication of the bull, sporadic public burnings of Luther's works began to take place in Germany in accordance with Leo X's instructions. However, in some places this directive proved impossible or difficult to carry out because of Luther's popular support. On certain occasions, his followers managed to substitute his condemned books with wastepaper or anti-Luther tracts, or rescue some of his works from the flames before they were consumed.

On 29 November 1520, Luther published a second response to the bull entitled Assertion of All the Articles Wrongly Condemned in the Roman Bull. Luther's commentary on proposition number 18 provides a representative example of its general tone: "I was wrong, I admit it, when I said that indulgences were 'the pious defrauding of the faithful'. I recant and say, 'Indulgences are the most pious frauds and imposters of the most rascally pontiffs, by which they deceive the souls and destroy the goods of the faithful.'" Luther also published his On the Freedom of a Christian that same month. Although this work was not penned as a direct response to the bull, it nevertheless reaffirmed Luther's commitment to certain themes censured therein, including the primacy of ecumenical councils over papal decrees.

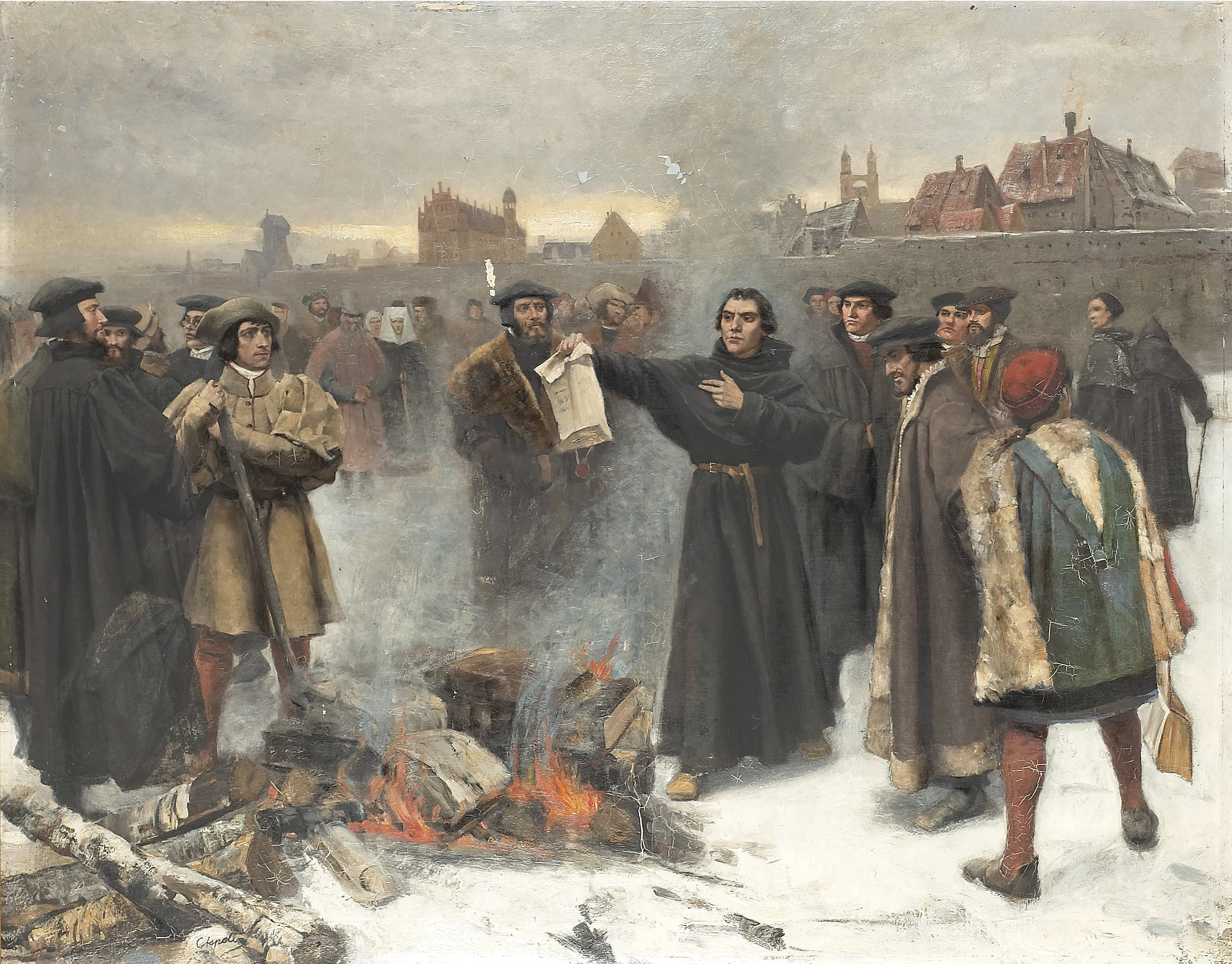
Painting of Luther burning the bull by Karl Aspelin

On 10 December 1520, sixty days after Luther had received a copy of this bull, he and Melanchthon invited the local university faculty and students to assemble that morning at the Elster Gate in Wittenberg. A bonfire was lit and volumes of canon law, papal constitutions, and works of scholastic theology were burned. Luther himself tossed a copy of the bull into the flames. Having done so, Luther is reported to have said: "Because you have confounded the truth [or, the saints] of God, today the Lord confounds you. Into the fire with you!", a declaration which alludes to Psalm 21:9.

Luther himself later explained his actions that day:

Since they have burned my books, I burn theirs. The canon law was included because it makes the pope a god on earth. So far I have merely fooled with this business of the pope. All my articles condemned by Antichrist are Christian. Seldom has the pope overcome anyone with Scripture and with reason.

The breach between Luther and the papacy was finalized on 3 January 1521, when on account of Luther's failure to comply, the Pope issued the bull Decet Romanum Pontificem to declare that he had been formally excommunicated.

=== Modern ===
Exsurge Domine marks a watershed event in Christian history. Protestant author Philip Schaff notes: "The bull of excommunication is the papal counter-manifesto to Luther's Theses, and condemns in him the whole cause of the Protestant Reformation. Therein lies its historical significance. It was the last bull addressed to Latin Christendom as an undivided whole, and the first which was disobeyed by a large part of it."

However, contemporary scholars of the Reformation widely agree that this bull itself is a "strange document and an evasive assessment of Luther's theological concerns". Schaff notes that the condemned propositions are "torn from the connection [context], and presented in the most objectionable form as mere negations of Catholic doctrines. The positive views of the Reformer are not stated, or distorted." Catholic author John M. Todd calls the bull "contradictory, lacking in charity, and incidentally far less effective than it might have been". Not only does the text fail to identify precisely how each proposition is censured, but also it avoids direct engagement with numerous issues that are central to Luther's theology including sola fide and sola scriptura. In part, this evasion was simply an unavoidable consequence of the fact that Luther did not fully articulate his mature theological position until some time after this bull had been issued. Even so, Eck did not afford the committee sufficient time to better grasp the core issues at stake in Luther's teachings. As a result, some of the censured propositions are ambiguous, peripheral to Luther's main concerns, or were misunderstood or misrepresented by the committee. At least twelve of the forty-one propositions fail to accurately quote Luther or misrepresent his beliefs. The bull itself contains an internal contradiction: at one point it orders all of Luther's works to be burned, but elsewhere restricts this censorship only to those works which contain one of the forty-one censored propositions.

=== Proposition 33 ===
The censure of certain theological propositions in this bull continues to be a source of controversy. For example, proposition number 33 censured by this bull states: "It is contrary to the will of the Spirit that heretics be burned." (Note: Latin: Haereticos comburi, est contra voluntatem Spiritus.) The Catholic Church continued to burn heretics after that, including 3,000 to 5,000 heretics by the Spanish Inquisition alone. However, more than 400 years later, in 1965, the declaration Dignitatis Humanae of Vatican II stated that "the human person has a right to religious freedom", and that "[t]his freedom means that all men are to be immune from coercion on the part of individuals or of social groups and of any human power, in such wise that no one is to be forced to act in a manner contrary to his own beliefs, whether privately or publicly, whether alone or in association with others, within due limits", seem to have softened.

Eastern Orthodox author Laurent Cleenewerck asserts that Leo X's condemnations technically satisfy the requirements of an infallible (ex cathedra) definition, in accordance with the criteria laid down by Vatican I. The declaration of Leo X that members of the Catholic faithful must "condemn, reprobate, and reject completely each of these theses or errors" on pain of an automatic (latae sententiae) excommunication is said to constitute an authoritative papal definition on doctrinal matters concerning faith and morals which must be held by the whole Catholic Church. He then notes that the practice of burning heretics poses a "serious ethical problem" and thus Cleenewerck finds in Exsurge Domine support for his conclusion that "the idea that Papal Infallibility can be presented as independent of any conciliar consent and as 'the constant belief of the universal Church' is rejected."

Others disagree with those assessments and advance the alternative view that a censure that may be heretical but may also be merely "scandalous", "offensive to pious ears" or "seductive of simple minds" cannot be accepted as an infallible utterance of the Magisterium. Brian Harrison argues that a censure of an unspecified nature is potentially subject to future clarification or reform, unlike an ex cathedra definition, which is, by nature, irreformable. A second argument advanced here asserts that censures that are merely "scandalous", "offensive to pious ears" or "seductive of simple minds" strongly depend upon a particular context of certain historical or cultural circumstances. A proposition that causes scandal or offense when it is advanced within a particular context "may not necessarily be so noxious under different circumstances". Even if a proposition is essentially true but poorly worded or advanced in a particular context with the intent of provoking scandal or offense, it may be censured as "scandalous" or "offensive to pious ears". (Note: It is itself a matter of controversy whether the 16th century Magisterium would have permitted the Catholic faithful to embrace some censured propositions as being generally true and worthy of censure only when they are advanced in certain contexts with the intention of generating scandal or causing offense. In a debate with Eck, Luther himself attempted to defend some of Jan Hus' propositions which the Council of Constance had condemned in globo as either heretical, erroneous, blasphemous, presumptuous, seditious or offensive to pious ears. Eck replied to Luther with the retort, "Whichever they were, none of them was called most Christian and evangelical, and if you defend them, then you are heretical, erroneous, blasphemous presumptuous, seditious, and offensive to pious ears respectively.")

== Manuscript copies ==
A copy of Exsurge Domine is extant in the Vatican Library.

== Sources ==
- Akin, Jimmy (September 2001). "Identifying infallible statements". This Rock. 12 (7). San Diego, CA: Catholic Answers. ISSN 1049-4561. Archived from the original on 2016-01-27.
- Bainton, Roland H. (1950). Here I Stand: A Life of Martin Luther. Abingdon-Cokesbury Press.
- Brecht, Martin (1993) [©1985]. Martin Luther. Vol. 1. Translated by James Schaaf. Philadelphia: Fortress. ISBN 978-0-8006-0738-8.
- Cleenewerck, Laurent (2008). His Broken Body: Understanding and Healing the Schism between the Roman Catholic and Eastern Orthodox Churches. Euclid University Press. ISBN 9780615183619.
- Dolan, John P. (1965). History of the Reformation (Mentor-Omega ed.). Toronto: The New American Library of Canada Limited.
- Harrison, Brian W. (September 2005). "Torture and corporal punishment as a problem in Catholic theology". Living Tradition (theological journal) (119). St. Louis, MO: Oblates of Wisdom. OCLC 45859084. Archived from the original on 2007-02-10.
- Hillerbrand, Hans Joachim (1969). "Martin Luther and the Bull Exsurge Domine" (PDF). Theological Studies. 30 (1). Milwaukee, WI: Marquette University: 108–112. doi:10.1177/004056396903000106. ISSN 2169-1304. S2CID 170382766.
- Hillerbrand, Hans Joachim (2007). The Division of Christendom: Christianity in the Sixteenth Century. Presbyterian Publishing. ISBN 9780664224028.
- Pope Leo X (15 June 1520). "Exsurge Domine".
- Schaff, Philip (1916) [©1888]. "The German reformation from the publication Luther's theses to the Diet of Worms A.D. 1517–1521". History of the Christian church. Vol. 6 (2nd rev. ed.). Charles Scribner's Sons.
- One or more of the preceding sentences incorporates text from a publication now in the public domain: Sollier, Joseph (1908). "Theological Censures". In Herbermann, Charles (ed.). Catholic Encyclopedia. Vol. 3. New York: Robert Appleton Company.
- Todd, John M. (1964). Martin Luther: A Biographical Study. Paulist Press.
- "The Bull Exsurge Domine by Leo X". Vatican City: Vatican Secret Archives. c. 2006. Archived from the original on 2011-05-22.
