= Decet Romanum Pontificem =

1521 papal bull excommunicating Martin Luther

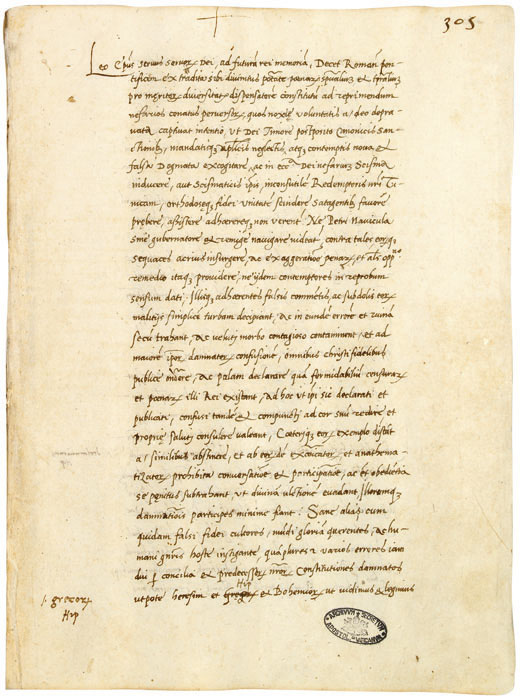
Decet Romanum Pontificem

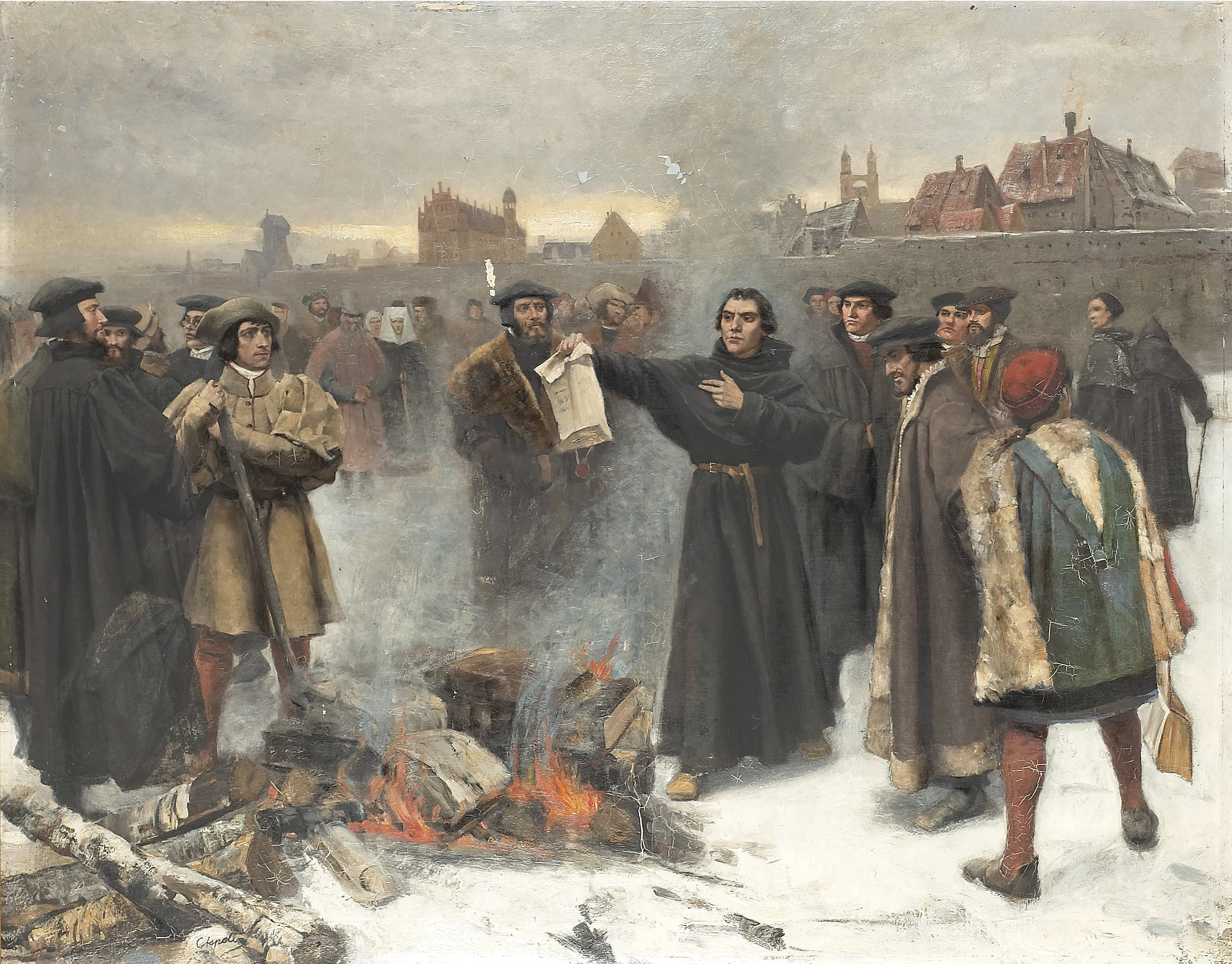
Painting of Luther burning a copy of Exsurge Domine by Karl Aspelin

Decet Romanum Pontificem (from Latin: "It Befits the Roman Pontiff") is a papal bull issued on 3 January 1521 by Pope Leo X to excommunicate German theologian Martin Luther and some of his colleagues—notably Andreas Karlstadt—for refusing to recant forty-one theses censured in the earlier papal bull Exsurge Domine. Luther had burned his copy of Exsurge Domine on 10 December 1520 at the Elster Gate in Wittenberg to indicate his response. The title Decet Romanum Pontificem comes from the first three Latin words of its text.

== Significance ==
With Luther's excommunication, the path of an internal church reform movement was definitively blocked. This provided a negative papal justification for the schism that led to the confessional independence of Protestantism. The positive development of the Reformation up to the Augsburg Confession of 1530 can also be interpreted as a necessary reaction to the new situation in documented opposition to the Pope. The persecution of the followers of the Reformation that accompanied the bull failed, unlike previous persecutions of church reform movements. This was due, not least, to the political situation at that time in the Holy Roman Empire.

There are at least two other important papal bulls with the title Decet Romanum Pontificem: one dated 23 February 1596, issued by Pope Clement VIII, and one dated 12 March 1622, issued by Pope Gregory XV.

== Aftermath ==
Toward the end of the 20th century, Lutherans in dialogue with the Catholic Church requested the lifting of this excommunication, but the Roman Curia responded that its practice is to lift excommunications only on those still living. Roland Bainton, in "Here I Stand after a Quarter of a Century", his preface for the 1978 edition of his Luther biography, concluded: "I am happy that the Church of Rome has allowed some talk of removing the excommunication of Luther. This might well be done. He was never a heretic. He might better be called, as one has phrased it, 'a reluctant rebel.'"

In 2008, a Vatican spokesman, the Jesuit Federico Lombardi, said: "Rumors that the Vatican is set to rehabilitate Martin Luther, the 16th-century leader of the Protestant Reformation, are groundless."
