= Pleissenburg =

Coordinates: 51°20′10″N 12°22′20″E

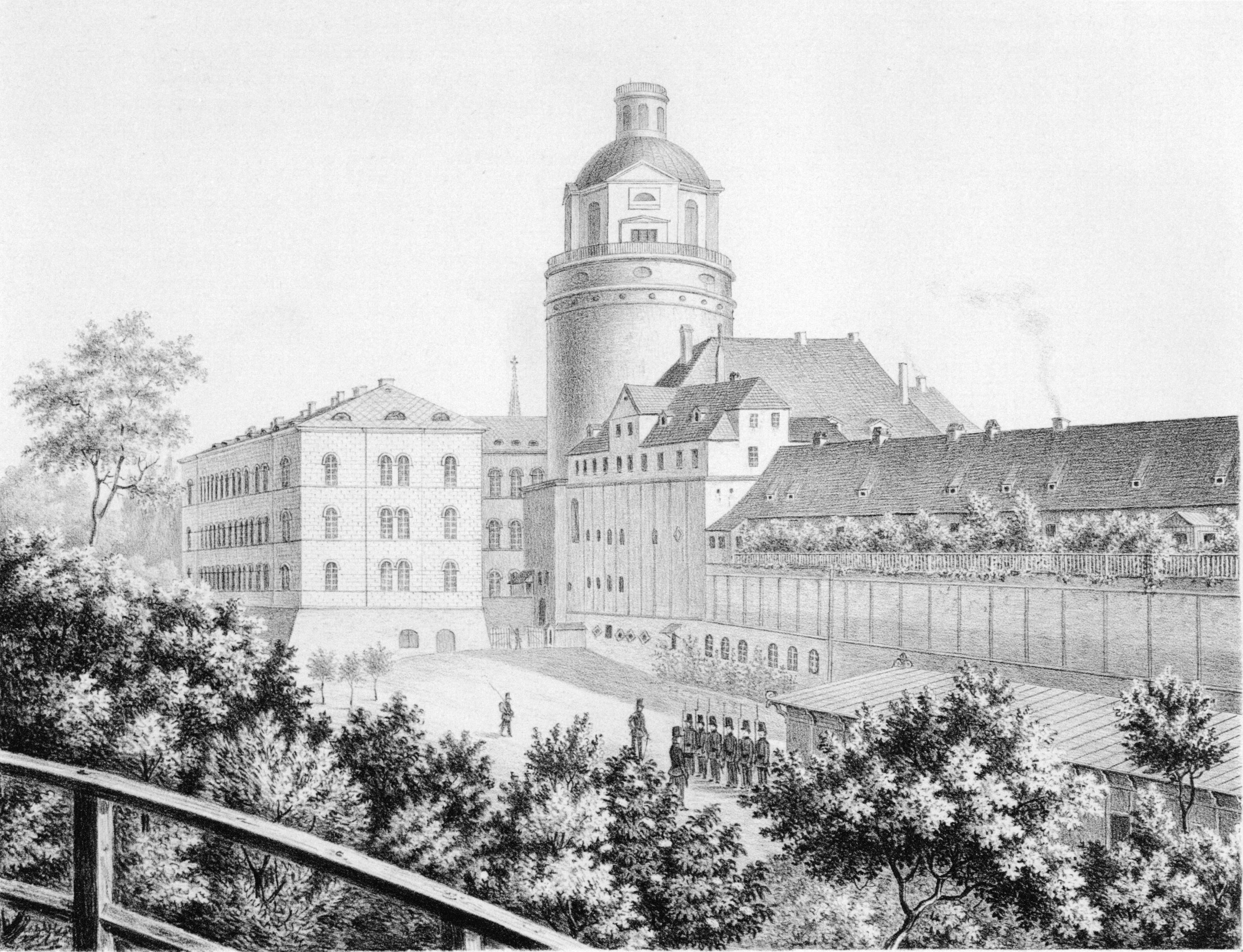
- Pleissenburg around 1860
- Interactive map of the Pleissenburg area

General information
- Architectural style: Renaissance (Reconstruction)
- Location: Leipzig
- Years built: 13th century, rebuilt 1549
- Demolished: 1897

Height
- Height: 52 metres (171 ft) (Tower height)

Design and construction
- Architect: Hieronymus Lotter (Reconstruction)

The Pleissenburg (German: Pleißenburg) was a historical building in the city of Leipzig in Saxony which is in modern-day Germany. It was built in the 13th century by Theodoric I, Margrave of Meissen and named after the Pleisse Mill Race (German: Pleißemühlgraben) which runs nearby and is often called for short Pleisse.

== History ==
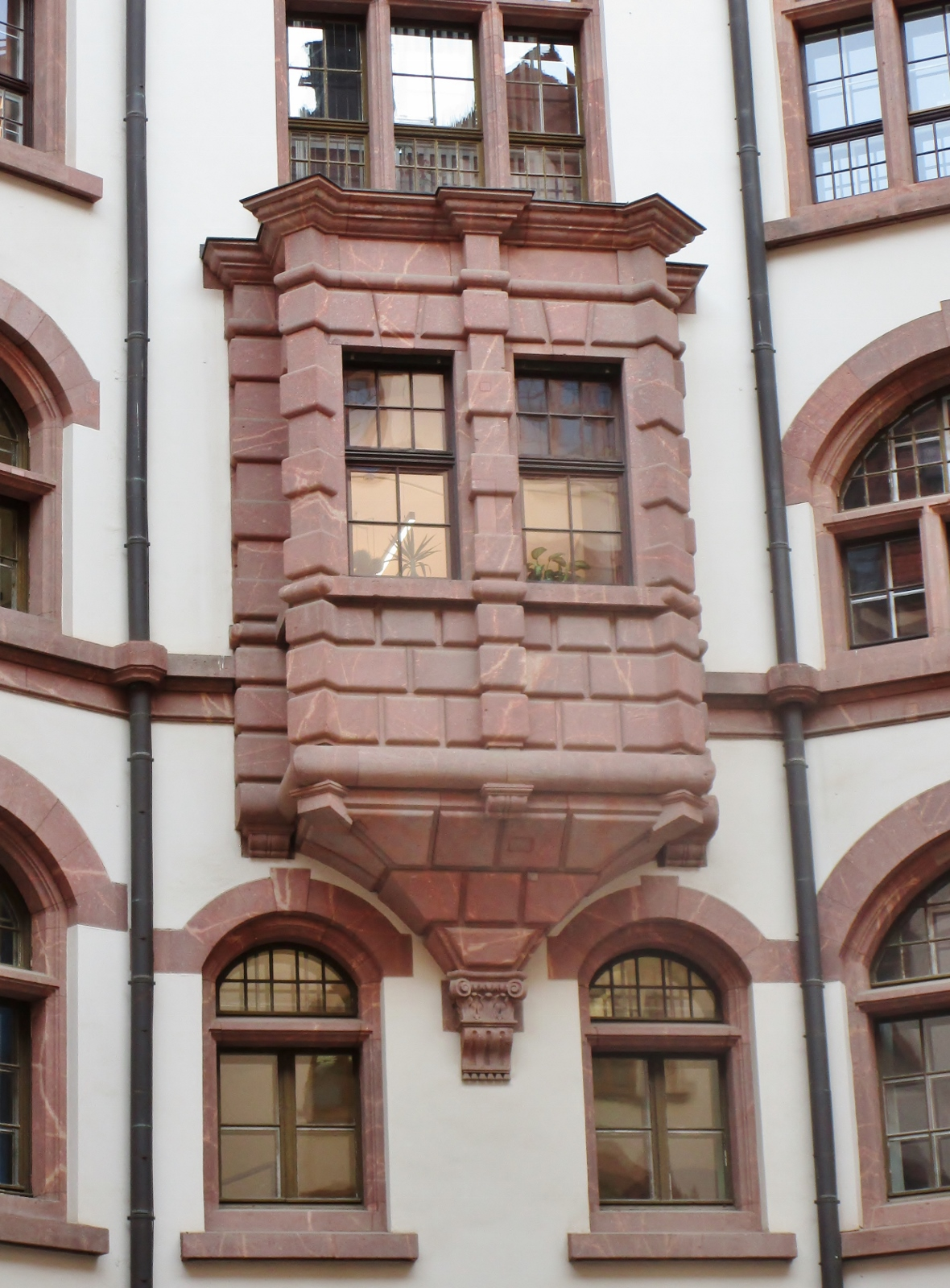
Pappenheim oriel window in the town hall courtyard (2023)

From 27 June to 16 July 1519, the debate in the form of theses and counter-theses between Martin Luther and Johann Eck, which became known as the Leipzig Debate, took place on the Pleissenburg. Martin Luther delivered the first Protestant sermon in Leipzig on Pentecost 1539 in the castle chapel.

After the severe destruction caused by the siege of the Schmalkaldic War, Maurice, Elector of Saxony (1521–1553) had the castle demolished in 1548 and rebuilt as a triangular fortress in 1549 under the direction of Hieronymus Lotter (1497–1580). The new Pleissenburg was attached to the city's fortification system and separated from the main walls by its own moat, so that it assumed the function of a citadel. It was equipped with casemates and a triangular bastion on the field side.

The fortress also housed the city's first post-Reformation Catholic church. In 1697 Elector Augustus II the Strong (1670–1733) converted to Catholicism. Therefore, the Catholics living in Leipzig asked for permission to found their own chapel. In 1710 the king instructed the commander of the Pleissenburg fortress to set up a room for masses there. At the same time the Jesuit priest Heinrich Eggerth was commissioned to care for the community. In the following years the Catholics of Leipzig were pastorated exclusively by the Jesuits and eventually three, then four dehonians lived here. They lived in a house in the city and were paid by the government.

In the Thirty Years' War, the attack of the Catholic League army under Johann Tserclaes, Count of Tilly on the Electorate of Saxony began with the capture of the Pleissenburg on 14 September 1631. The attack ended with the heavy defeat of Tilly's army at the Battle of Breitenfeld on 17 September against the Swedish-Saxon army of the Swedish king Gustavus Adolphus.

After the Thirty Years' War and the capture of Leipzig by the Swedes in September 1706, the Pleissenburg gradually lost its military importance. In 1764 it was deleted from the list of Saxon fortresses. It was still used as an administrative building and barracks. From 1765 to 1790, the newly founded Leipzig Academy of Fine Arts under Adam Friedrich Oeser (1717–1799) was based in the Pleissenburg - here the young student Johann Wolfgang Goethe (1749–1832) learned drawing from Oeser. The naturalist Wilhelm Gottlieb Tilesius von Tilenau also studied here. In 1753 the Leipzig mint was moved to the Pleissenburg casemates. It was closed in 1765 because it was no longer needed. In 1784 the chemist Christian Gotthold Eschenbach (1753–1831) founded the first chemical laboratory of the Leipzig University in the Pleissenburg.

From 1794, the Leipzig Observatory, built by Leipzig's director of city planning Johann Carl Friedrich Dauthe (1746–1816), stood atop the Pleissenburg Tower and was visible from afar. From 1838 to 1876, the western wing served as accommodation for the Königlich-Sächsische Baugewerkenschule Leipzig (Royal-Saxon Construction School Leipzig) founded by Albert Geutebrück (1801–1868), which emerged from the Architecture Department of the Academy of Fine Arts as an independent educational institution.

With the opening of the Möckern barracks in 1875, the centuries-long military use of the Pleissenburg ended. In 1895, the city of Leipzig purchased the castle from the Kingdom of Saxony. The demolition of the Pleissenburg began in 1897, and around 1900 today's Burgplatz was built on parts of the area. From 1899 to 1905, under the direction of Hugo Licht (1841–1923), the monumental New Town Hall was built. The total area of all buildings of the former Pleissenburg was larger. The town hall and the building of the Leipziger Bank, now a branch of Deutsche Bank, were also built on their site.

All that remains of the Pleissenburg is the tower designed by Hieronymus Lotter as the base for the summit of the New Town Hall, which is visible from afar. The so-called Pappenheim oriel window in the inner courtyard of the old Pleissenburg has also been preserved, which commemorates the imperial cavalry general Gottfried Heinrich Graf zu Pappenheim who died near Lützen in 1632 and was placed behind this window.

The development in pictuers

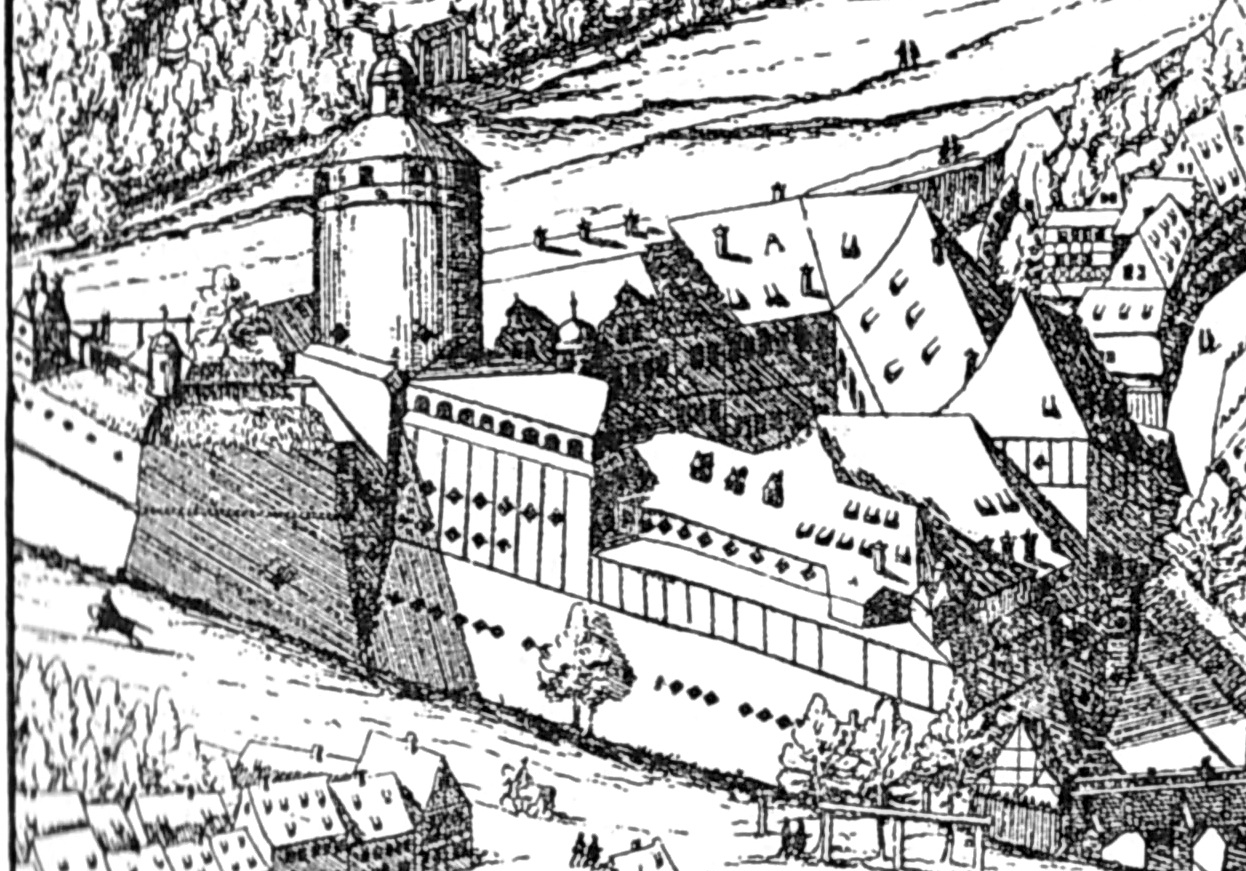
1615

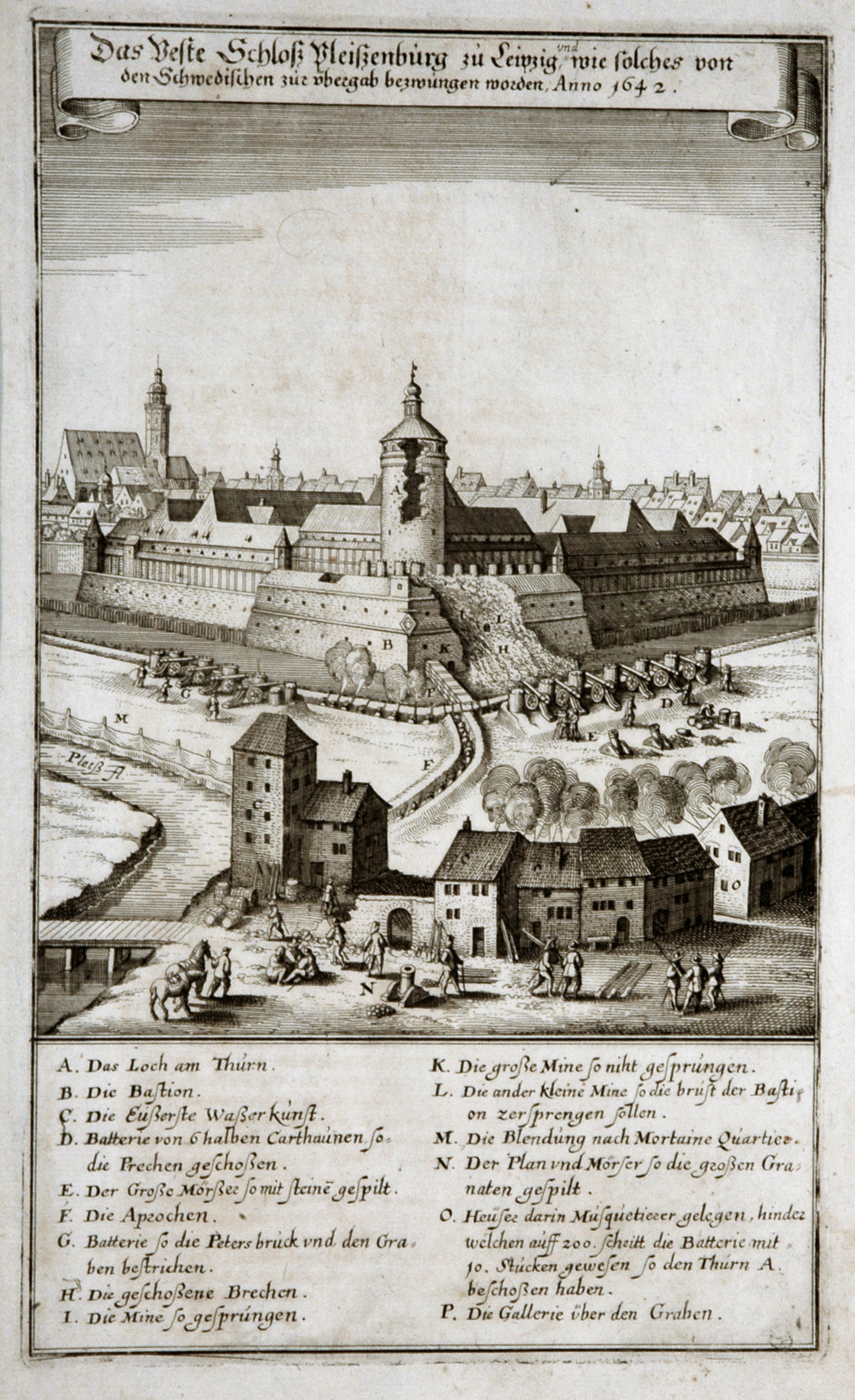
1642

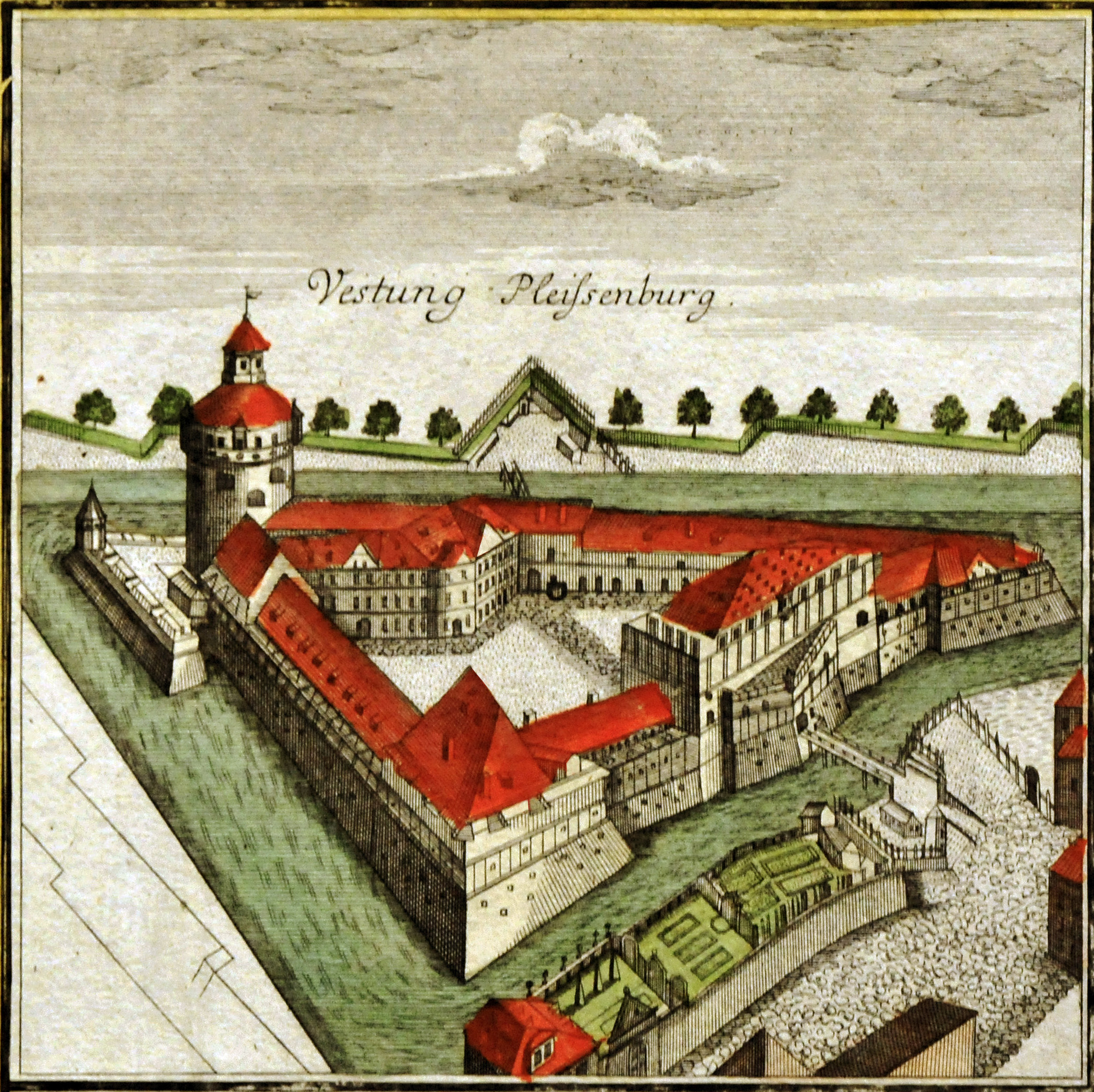
1749

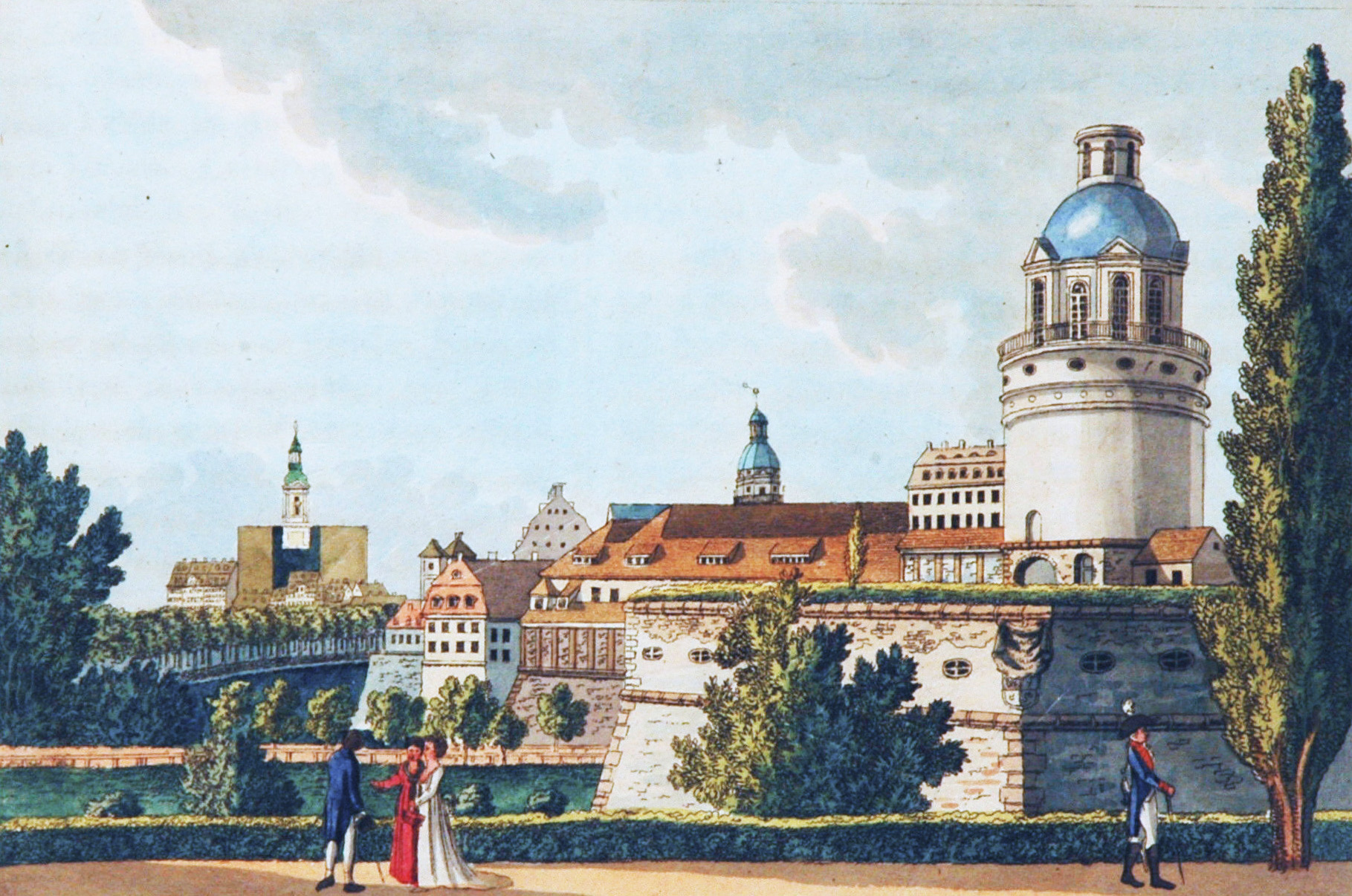
1804

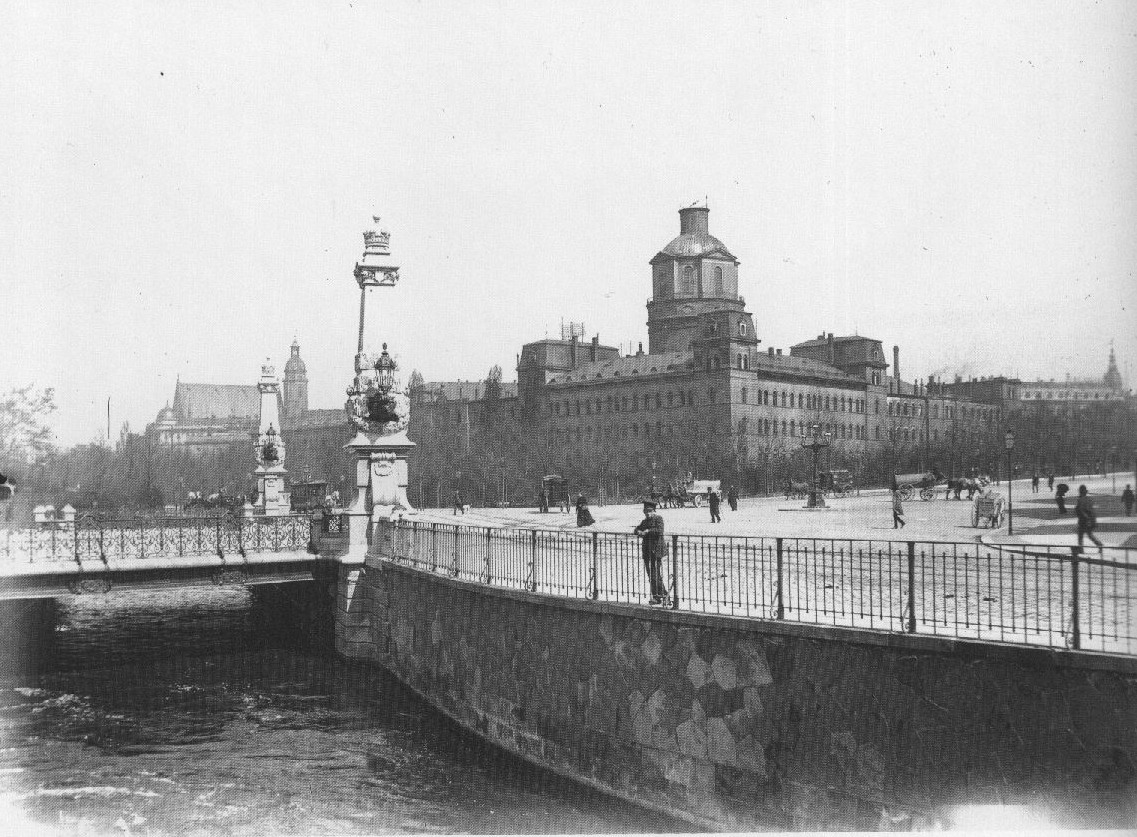
1890

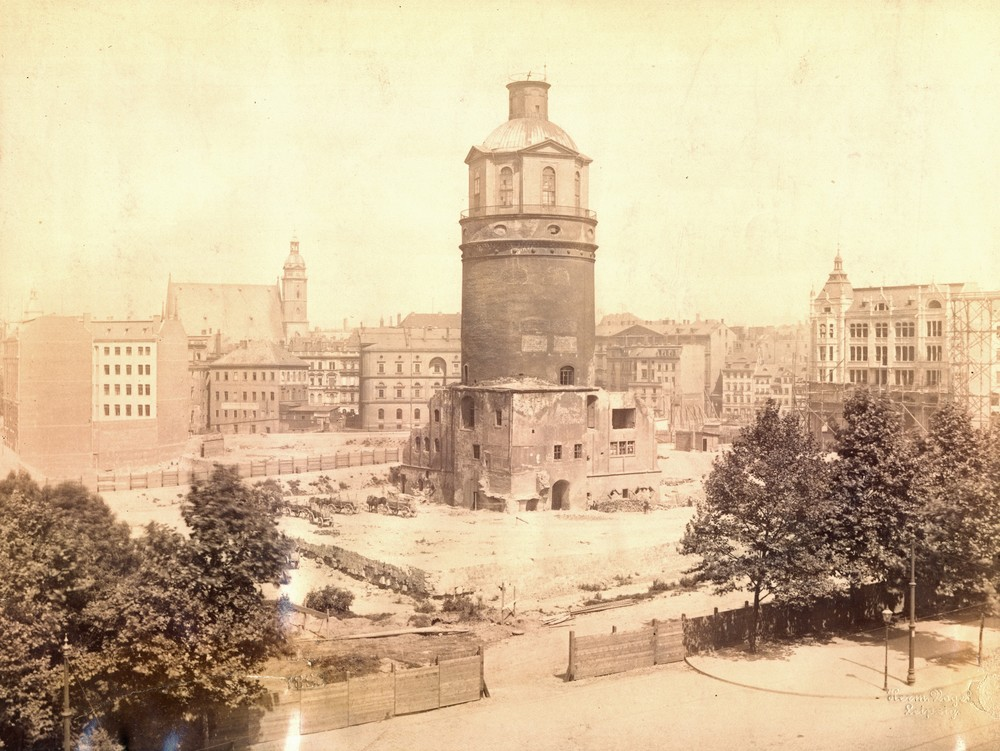
Tower during demolition in 1899

== See also ==
- Architecture of Leipzig - Renaissance
