= Gunnar Aspelin =

Swedish professor of philosophy

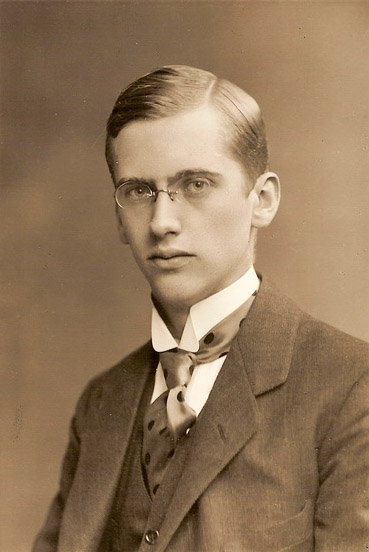
Gunnar Aspelin when he was a young man.

Gunnar Aspelin (23 September 1898, in Södra Mellby, Kristianstads län – 29 August 1977), was a Swedish professor of philosophy at Lund University in Lund, Sweden.

Prof. Aspelin was the son of the artist Karl Aspelin (1857–1932) and his wife Ellen Bergh. Prof. Aspelin married in 1923 with Dagmar Scherstén, daughter of the physician Frithiof Scherstén and Ida Schröder. Prof. Aspelin was the father of Herbert Aspelin, the researcher in comparative literature Kurt Aspelin, the lawspeaker Erland Aspelin, the teacher Marianne Aspelin and the artist Gert Aspelin.

Prof. Aspelin received his doctorate at Lund University in 1925 on the dissertation Hegels praktiska filosofi under åren 1800-1803 ("The practical philosophy of Hegel during the years 1800-1803"). The same year Prof. Aspelin became a docent in Practical Philosophy at Lund University. In his dissertation, as well as in following works, he had a marxist view of history.

In 1936 he was named a Professor at the University of Gothenburg, and in 1949 he became a Professor in Theoretical Philosophy at Lund University. In 1953 he co-founded the Hans Larsson Society, and was its first chair. In 1968 Prof. Aspelin published his memoirs Lek och allvar ("Play and seriousness").

A common thread in Prof. Aspelin's research was the relationship between the individual and the collective. He primarily focused on the philosophers Hans Larsson, John Locke, Karl Marx, Hegel, Bertrand Russell and Ralph Cudworth. During his later years he became interest in the ideas of the medieval age, and also conducted research in the fields of history of ideas and sociology. In 1958 he published the work Tankens vägar ("The paths of thought"), which is a survey of the history of philosophy in Europe.
