= Burgplatz (Leipzig) =

Square in Leipzig, Germany

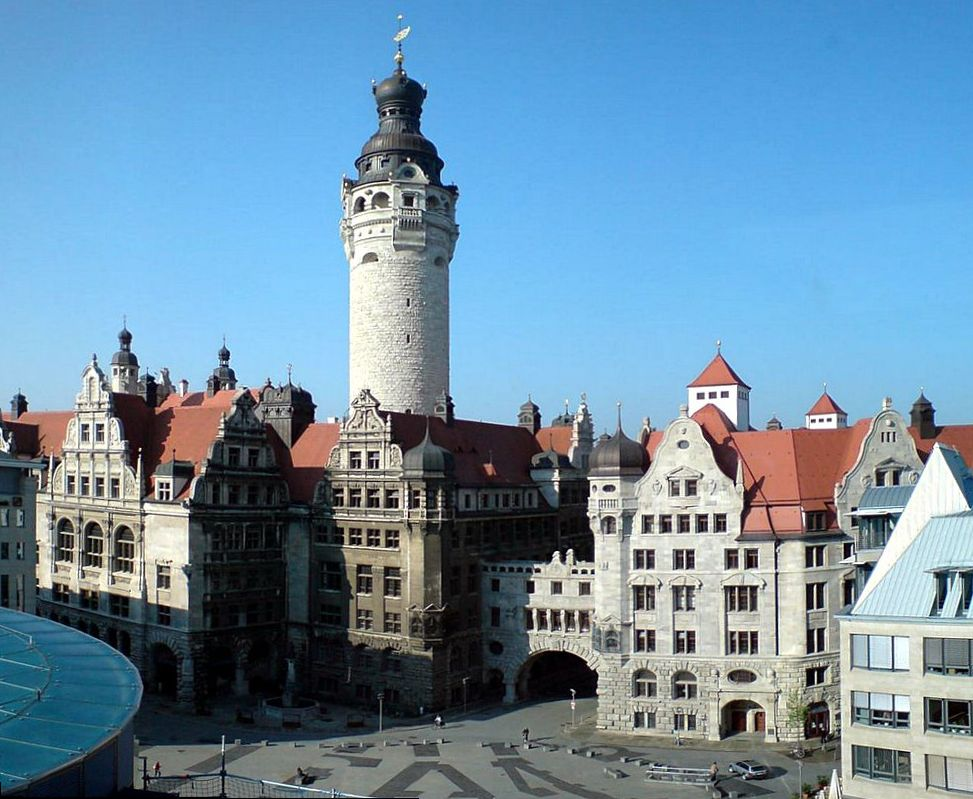
- Leipzig Burgplatz Panorama (2008) with the new town hall on the left and the Stadthaus on the right
- Interactive map of Burgplatz
- Location: Leipzig-Mitte, Leipzig, Germany
- Postal code: 04109
- Coordinates: 51°20′13″N 12°22′23″E

The Burgplatz (in English Castle square) is an approximately rectangular square of just over 2,000 square metres (22,000 square feet) in the southwest of the city center of Leipzig, Germany.

== History ==
The Burgplatz was created around 1900 on parts of the Pleissenburg site when it was demolished in 1897 to make room for the New Town Hall. The town hall was deliberately built a little out of town to create a new town square. The Burgplatz, whose name refers to the Pleissenburg, is the youngest of the inner-city squares. The Rathausbrunnen (Town hall fountain) by Georg Wrba was inaugurated on the square near the New Town Hall in 1908.

By the bombing of Leipzig in World War II, the square's entire peripheral development was destroyed or severely damaged. After clearing work, the castle square was only bordered by the town hall and the connected Stadthaus, the remaining structural enclosure was missing. It was used as a parking lot during the GDR era. There were also makeshift sales stalls on the extensive war gap, which stretched eastwards to Petersstrasse.

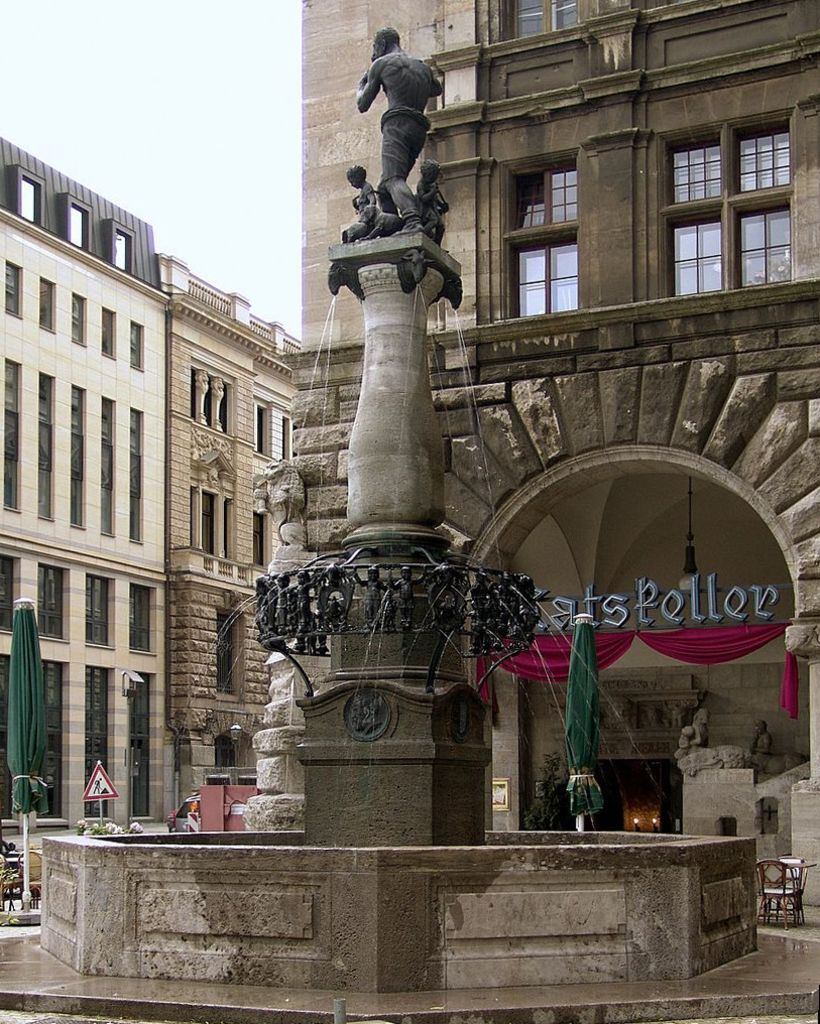
The town hall fountain

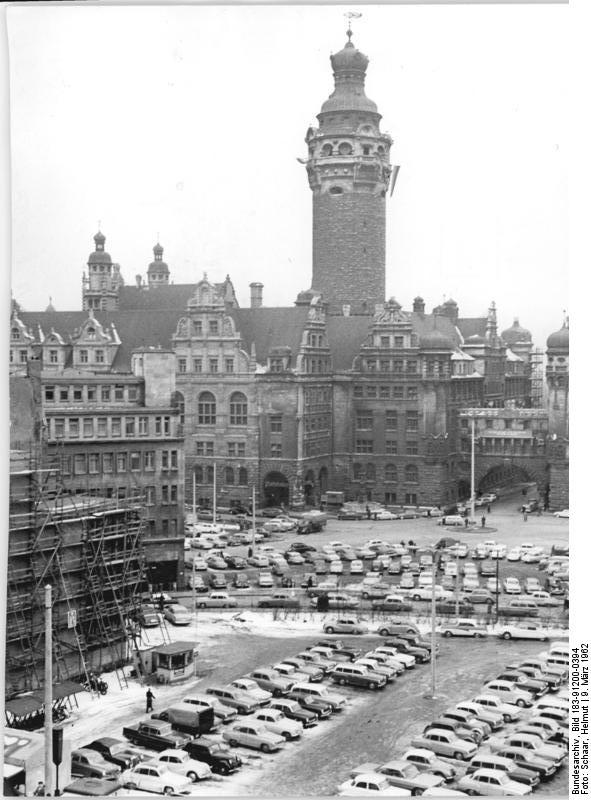
Burgplatz as a parking area in 1962

After the German reunification, the rededication into an urban square began; the peripheral development was supplemented by new buildings, some of which are based on the character of the original building structure.

== Current development and design ==
The New Town Hall closes off the square to the south and southwest, and the Stadthaus is to the west. Both buildings serve the city administration and are connected to each other by a two-story “bridge”.

The new building of the Bauwens House has been the end of the square to the north since 1994. The “Teiche House” previously stood on this site and was damaged in the war and later demolished. In the southeast there is an extension that was also added to the Deutsche Bank building in the 1990s with a tower-like risalit; it takes up the eaves height of the remaining part of the building, but is otherwise modern in design.

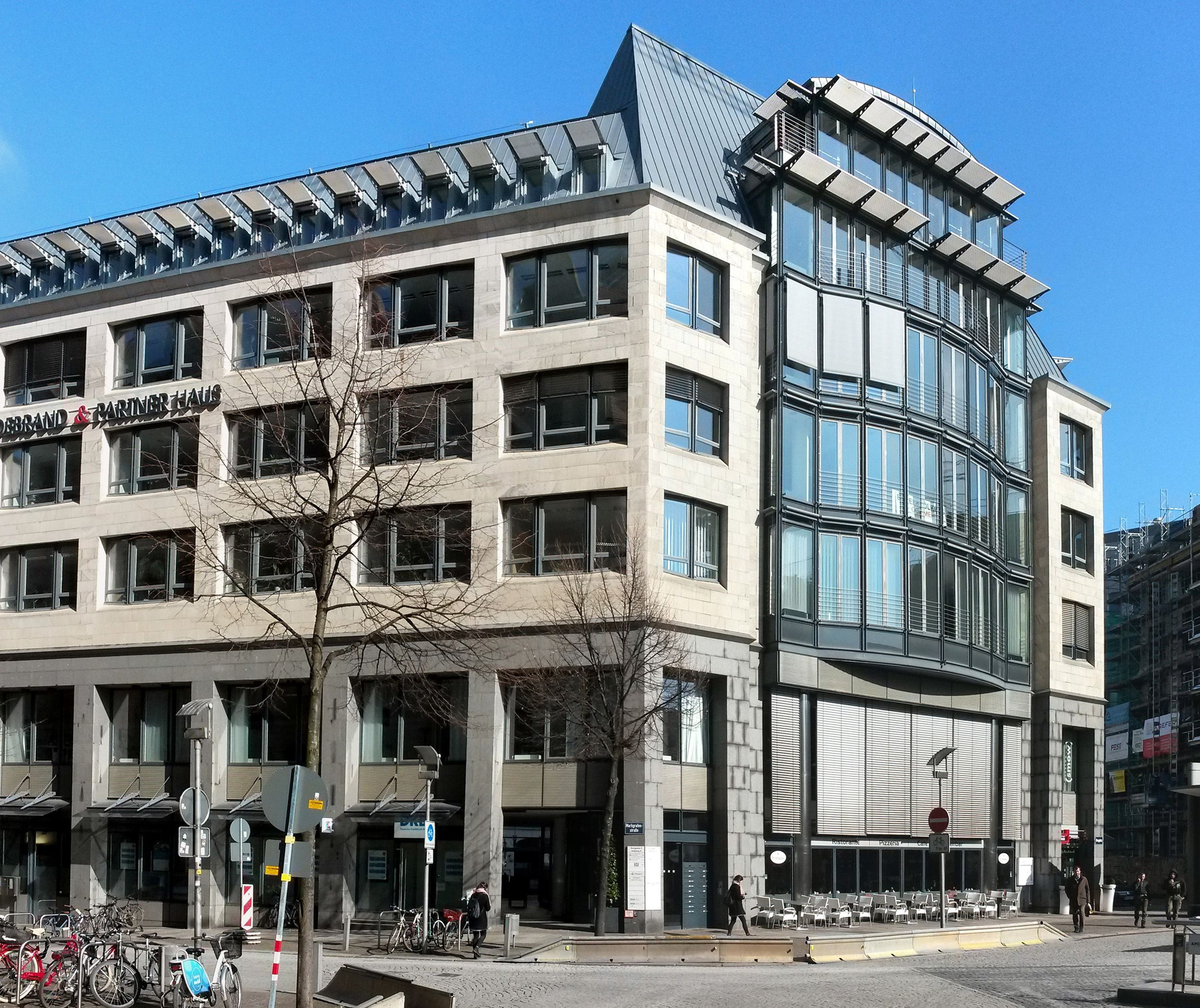
Bauwens House

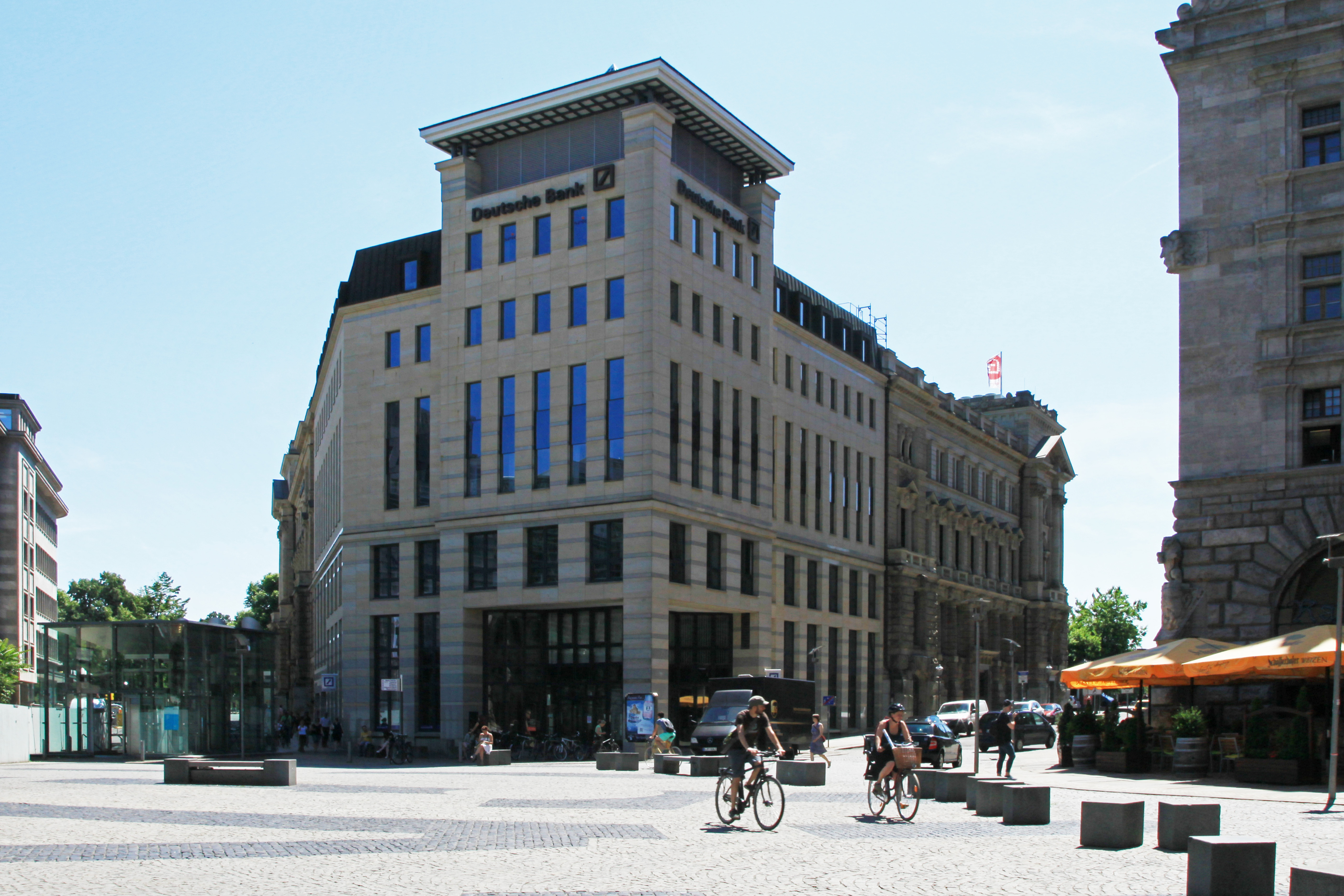
New Deutsche Bank building

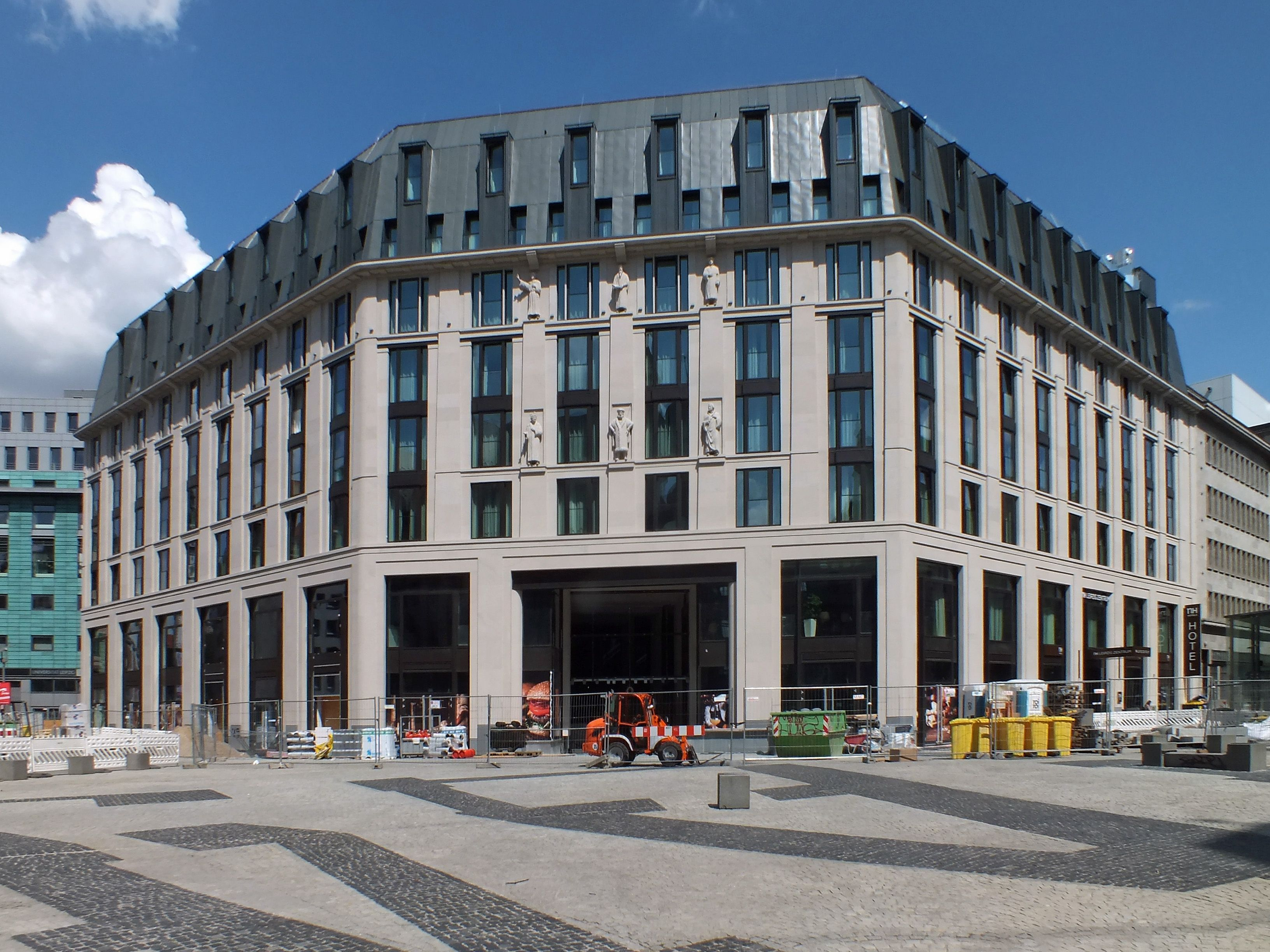
Entrance to the Burgplatz Passage

Spherical panorama of the square (2022) (view as a 360° interactive panorama)

To the east, at the site of the Hirzel House, which was destroyed in the war, there had been a cordoned-off open excavation pit for over twenty years since the mid-1990s, which was named Burgplatzloch (Burgplatz hole). It was created in 1995 during the construction of an underground parking garage for the western end of the Petersbogen structure, which was built between 1999 and 2001. The infill redevelopment did not take place despite several changes of ownership. It was only in 2017 that the construction of the building called Burgplatz Passage, which lasted until 2019, began according to the plans of the HPP architectural firm with the facade design by the Berlin architectural firm Christoph Kohl Stadtplaner Architekten CKSA. In addition to a passage to the Petersbogen, an arcade gallery, and shops and restaurants on the ground floor, it includes a hotel belonging to the NH Hotel Group on the upper floors. The facade, covered with Cotta Sandstone, contains six life-size figures with reference to the Leipzig Debate of 1519, which took place in the Pleissenburg castle opposite.

In 1995 an underground car park was built under the square. During the work, the foundation walls of the Pleissenburg were uncovered and examined archaeologically. The new paving reproduces the outline of the walls with darker stones.

== See also ==
- List of arcade galleries in Leipzig
- List of streets and squares in Leipzig
