= Leipzig Debate =

Debate between Lutheran reformers and a Dominican friar in 1519

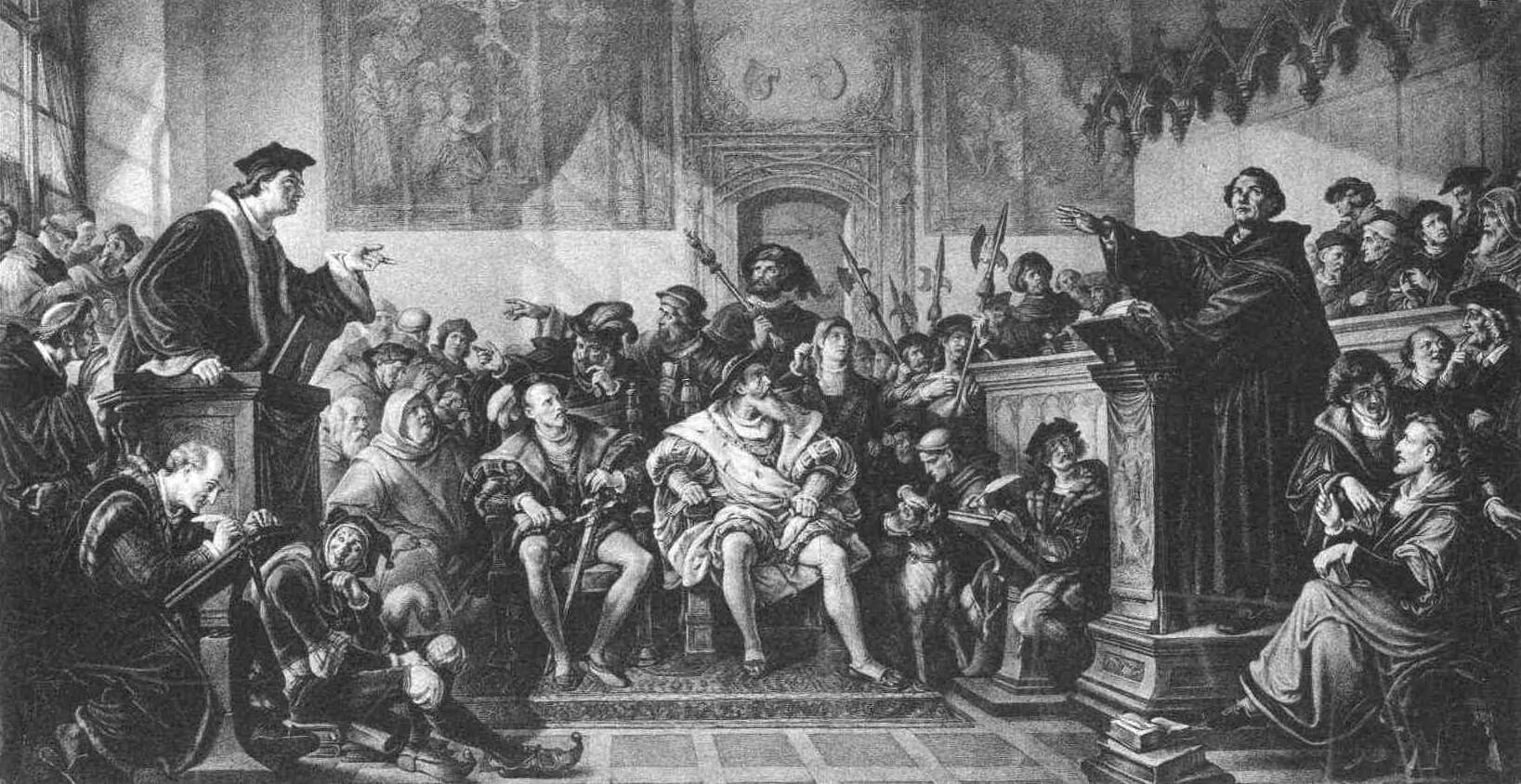
A depiction of the debate from the 1860s

The Leipzig Debate (German: Leipziger Disputation) was a theological disputation originally between Andreas Karlstadt, Martin Luther and Johann Eck. Karlstadt, the dean of the Wittenberg theological faculty, felt that he had to defend Luther against Eck's critical commentary on the 95 Theses and so challenged Johann Eck, a professor of theology at the University of Ingolstadt, to a public debate concerning the doctrines of free will and grace.

== Event ==
The Leipzig Debate took place in June and July 1519 at Pleissenburg Castle in Leipzig, Germany. Its purpose was to discuss Martin Luther's teachings and was initiated and conducted in the presence of George, Duke of Saxony, an opponent to Luther. Eck, considered the master debater in the Holy Roman Empire, was concerned about clerical abuses, but his life's work had been dedicated to the defence of Catholic teachings and combating heresy.

Eck invited Luther to join the debate, and when Luther arrived in July, he and Eck expanded the terms of the debate to include matters such as the existence of purgatory, the sale of indulgences, the need for and methods of penance and the legitimacy of papal authority.

Also, Luther's position (also supported by Erasmus) against burning heretics was later summarized as one of the positions (or errors) specifically censured in Exsurge Domine "Haereticos comburi est contra voluntatem Spiritus" (It is contrary to the Spirit to burn heretics).

The debate led Pope Leo X to censor Luther and threaten him with excommunication from the Catholic Church in his June 1520 papal bull, Exsurge Domine, which banned Luther's views from being preached or written.

== Participants ==
Representatives from Wittenberg

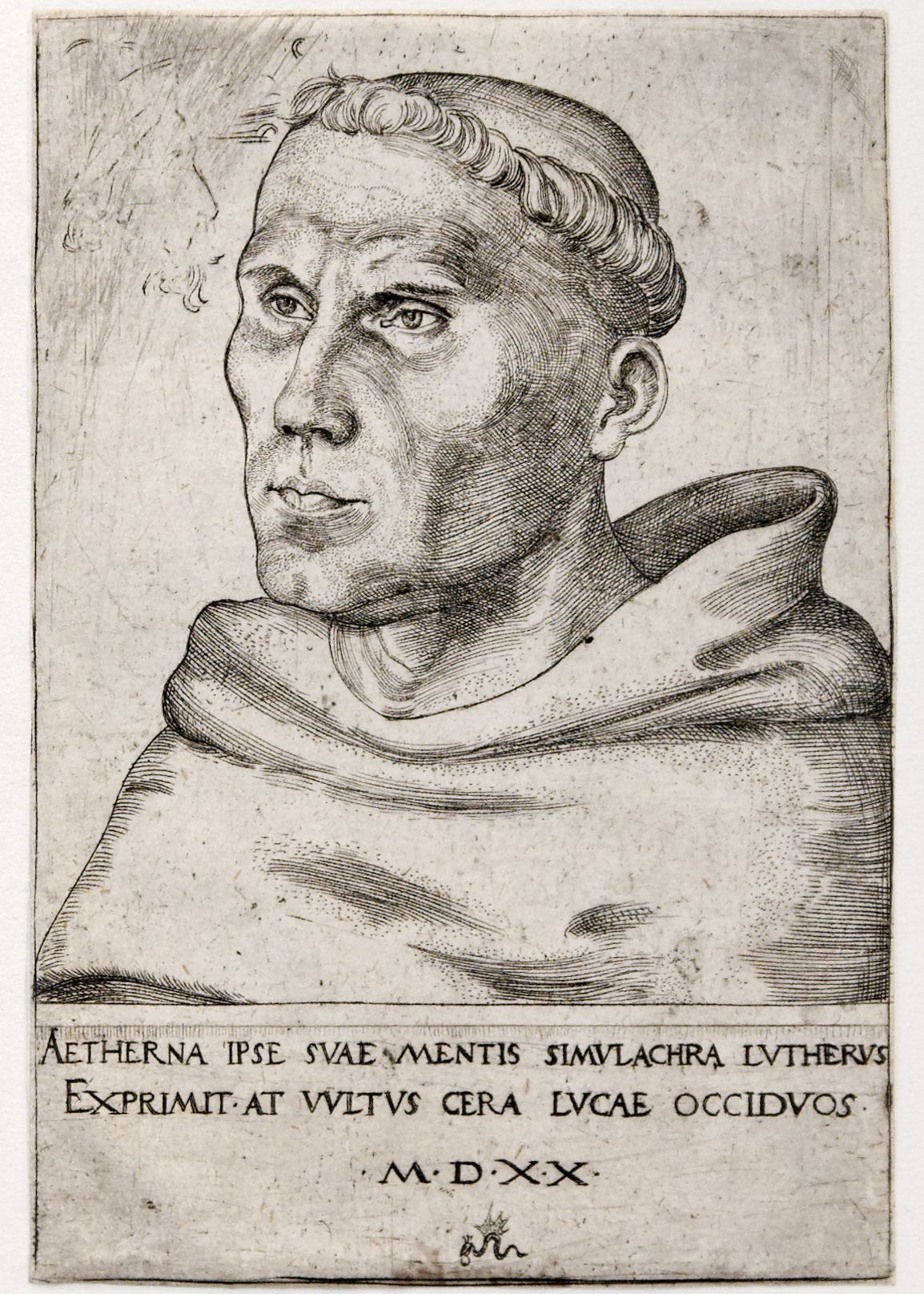
Martin Luther

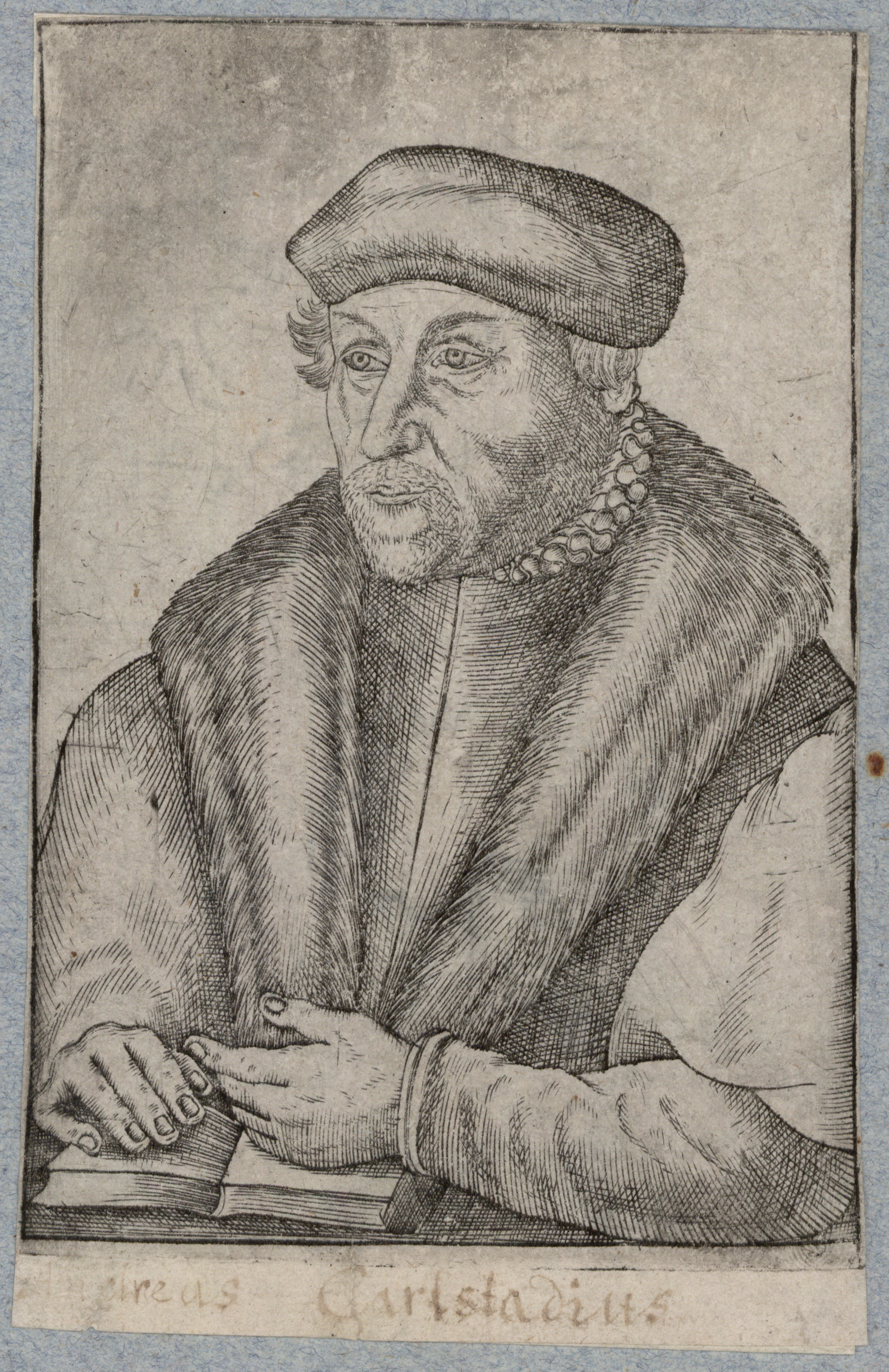
Andreas Karlstadt

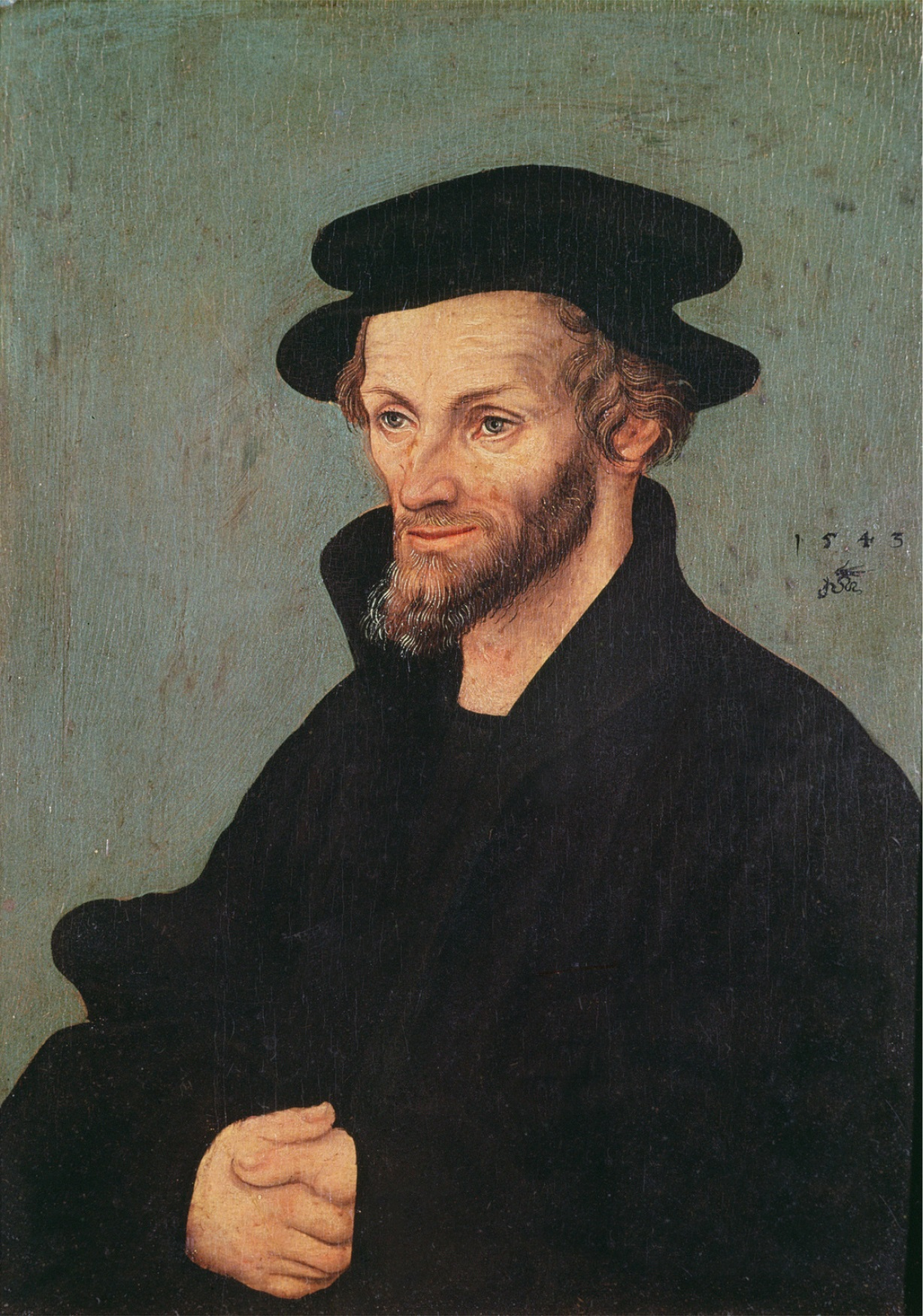
Philipp Melanchthon

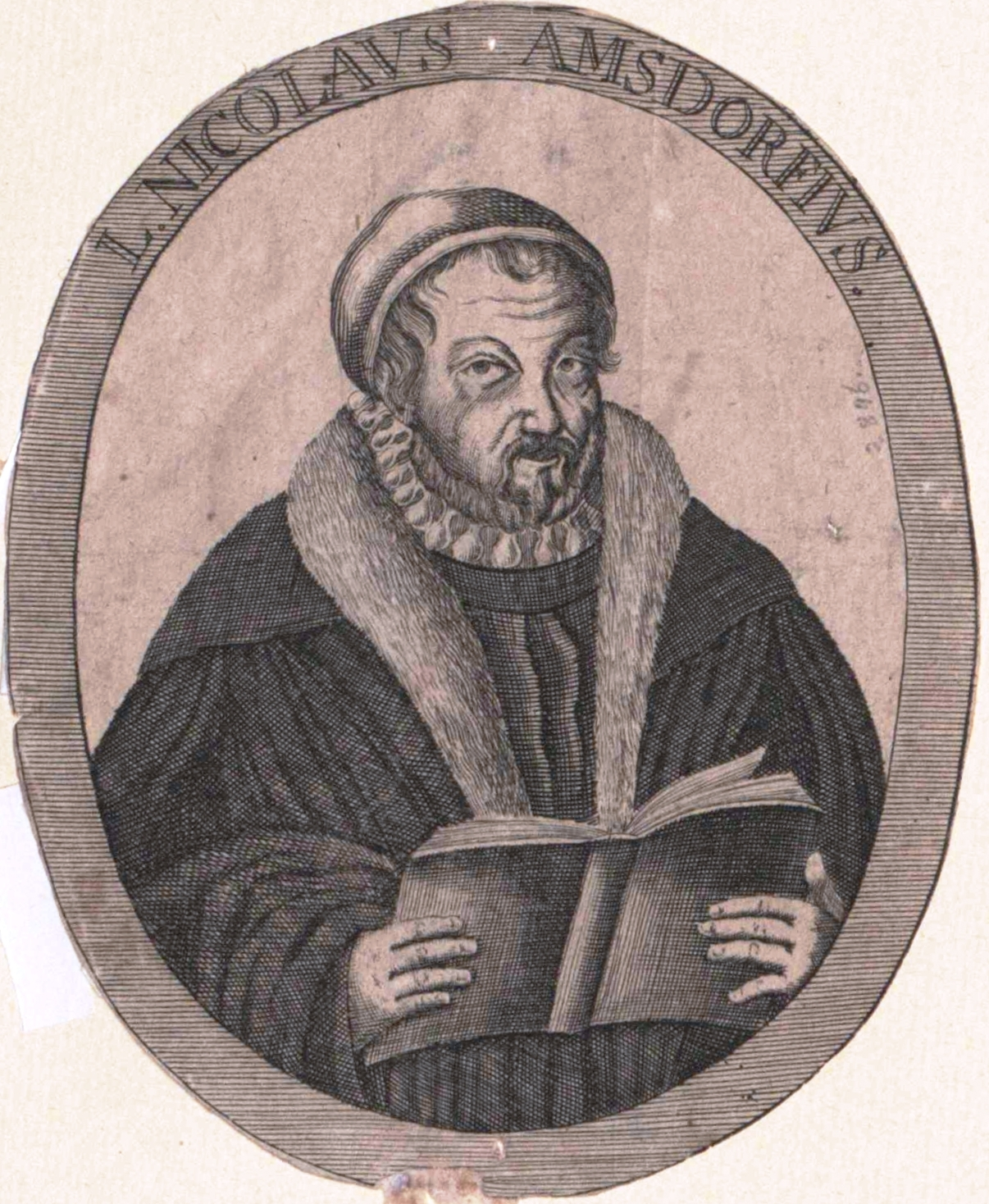
Nikolaus von Amsdorf
Representative from Ingolstadt

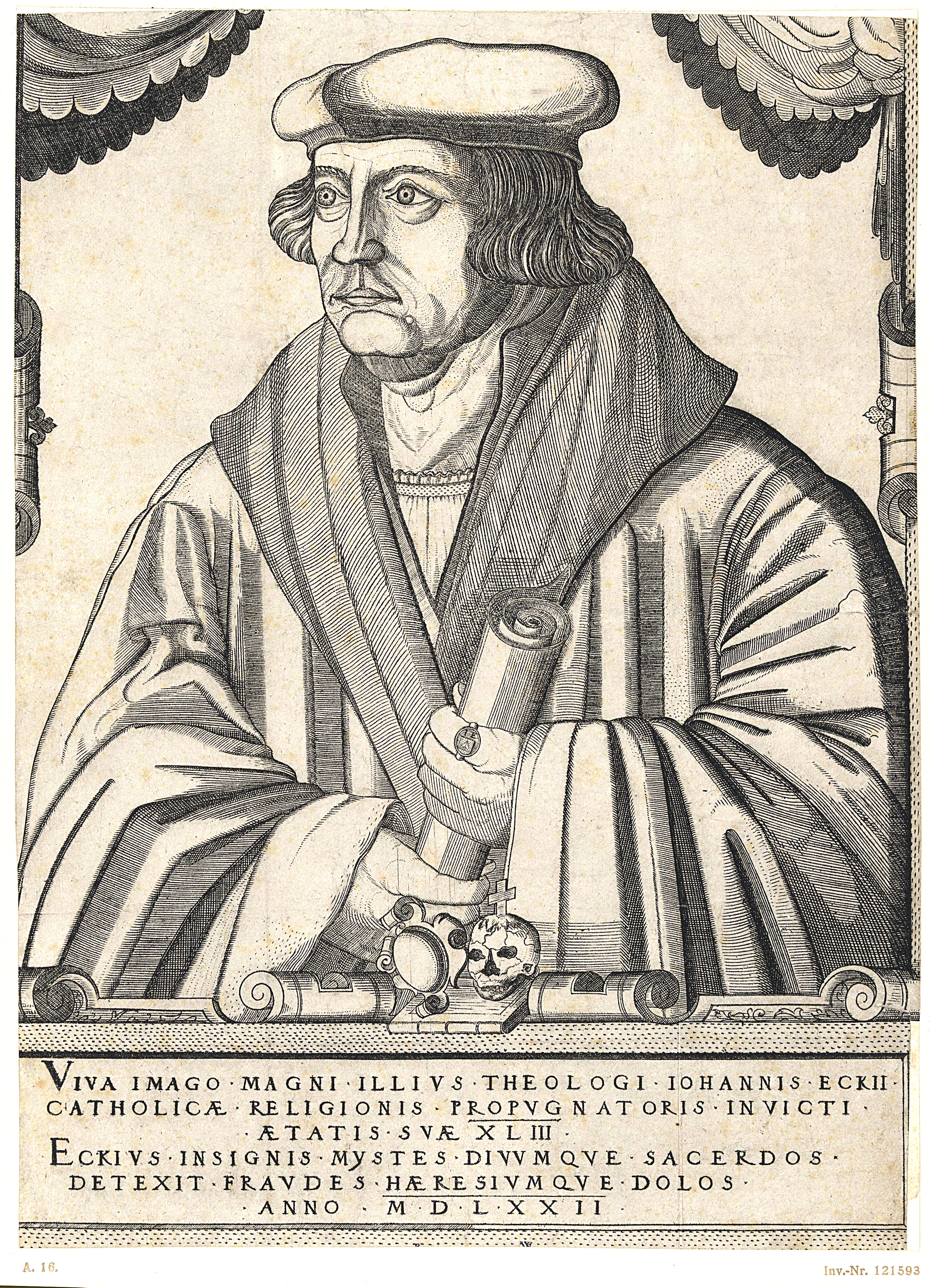
Johannes Eck

== Miscellaneous ==
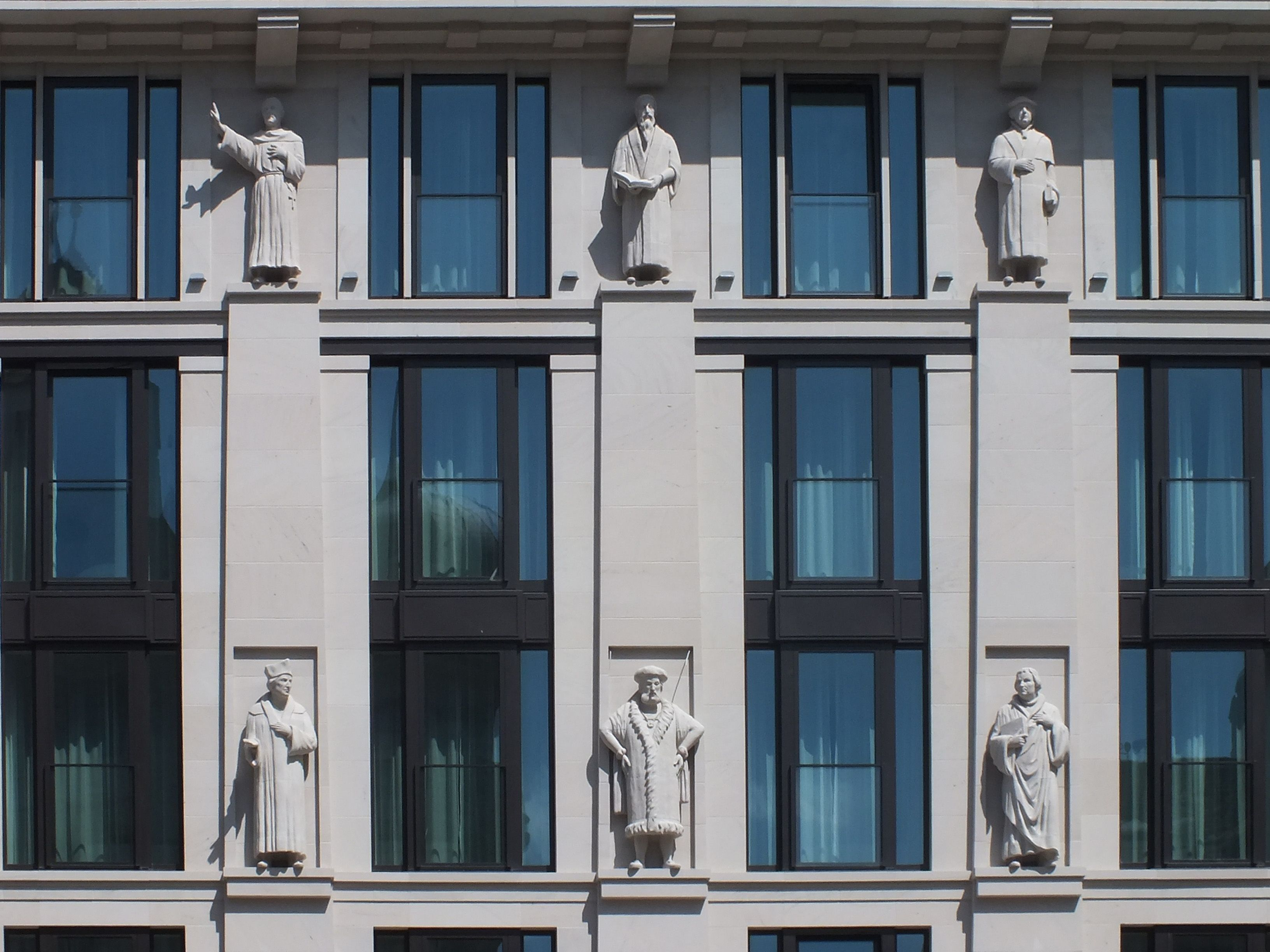
Figures at the facade of the Burgplatz-Passage in Leipzig

In Leipzig, the facade of the new building Burgplatz-Passage, covered with Cotta Sandstone, contains six life-size figures with reference to the Leipzig Debate, which took place in the Pleissenburg castle opposite.

== See also ==
- Diet of Worms
