= Brian Harrison (theologian) =

Brian W. Harrison OS (born 1945 in Sydney, Australia) is an Australian-born Roman Catholic priest and theologian. Harrison is a prolific writer on religious issues and an emeritus professor of theology at the Pontifical Catholic University of Puerto Rico (1989–2007). He speaks Spanish fluently.

Harrison is also an associate editor of "Living Tradition", a publication of the Roman Theological Forum hosted by the Oblates of Wisdom in St Louis, Missouri, United States, where Harrison currently lives at the order's study center. The forum's website contains many articles by Harrison, including one of the very few serious theological analyses carried out so far regarding biblical and Catholic teaching on torture and corporal punishment.

== Background and views ==
Harrison is also a young earth creationist Catholic.
