= Karl Aspelin =

Swedish artist (1857–1932)

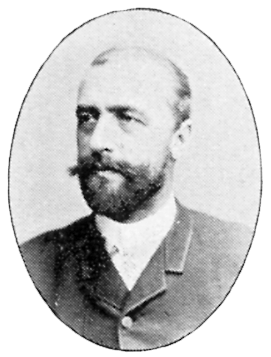
Aspelin in the Swedish Portrait Gallery

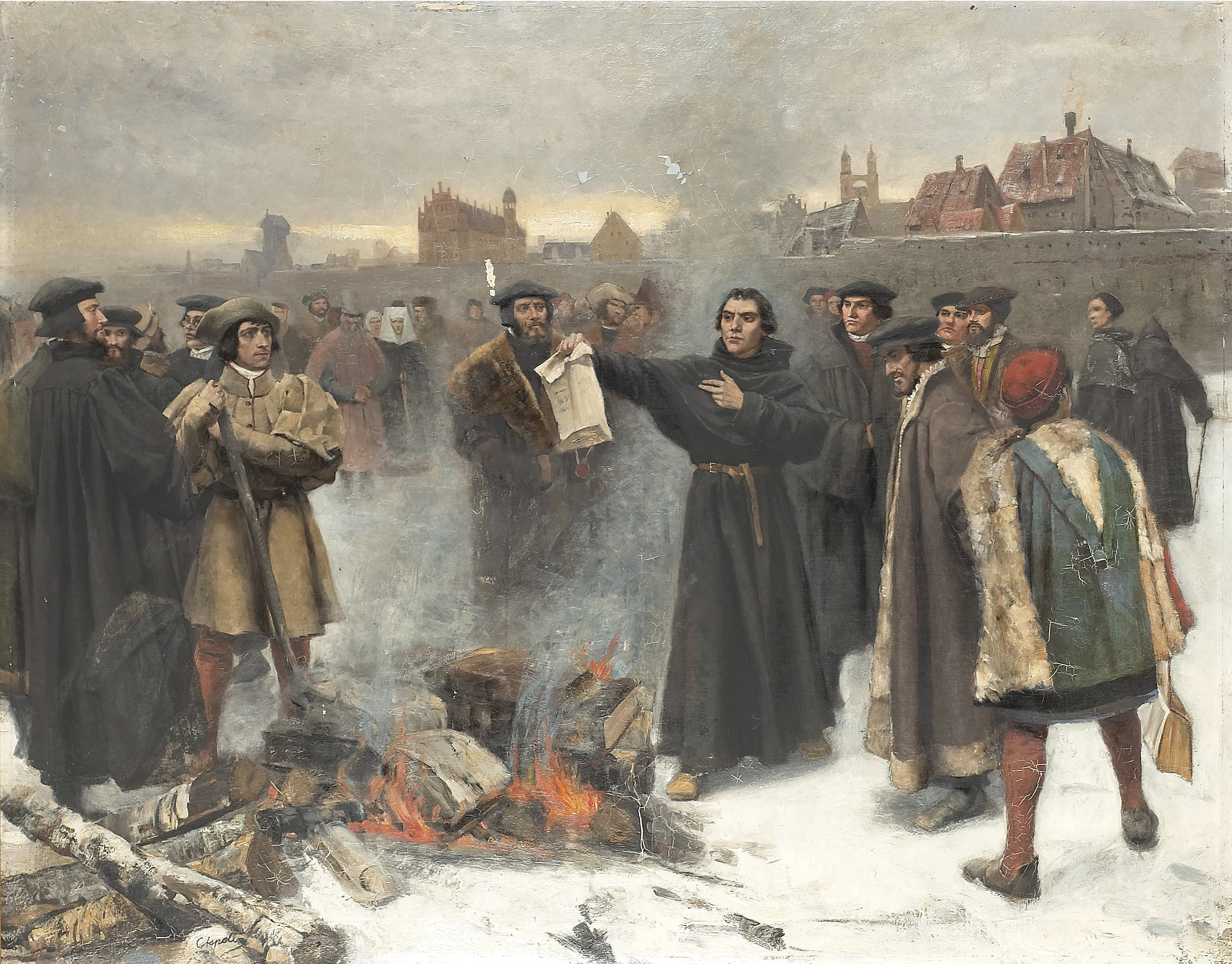
Luther Burning the Papal Bull by Aspelin, 1885.

Karl Johan Vilhelm Louis Aspelin (28 April 1857 - 9 April 1932) was a Swedish draughtsman, illustrator, pastellist, and portrait, history, interior, genre and landscape painter in oils.

He was born in the parish of Dädesjö, now part of Växjö Municipality, to the provincial physician John Gustaf Aspelin and Regina Hedenstierna. He was their only surviving child and grew up in Brösarp before studying at the Royal Swedish Academy of Fine Arts in Stockholm and then in Paris and Copenhagen. When he returned to Sweden after his studies, he settled permanently in Kivik. He later became an Impressionist.

He created a circle of friends and colleagues from the Stockholm Academy and the Swedish Artists' Union to work at his Villa Solbacken, with its view of Hanö Bay and its studio in that period's style. This circle became known as the "Kiviksskolan" or "Kivik School" and as Österlen's first artist collective was widely discussed.

He created illustrations for many of Henrik Wranér's stories. His works are in the Nationalmuseum, Stockholm and other collections. He died in the parish of Södra Mellby in Österlen and - like his son Gunnar Aspelin and his grandson Gert Aspelin - is buried in that parish's churchyard.

== Sources (in Swedish) ==
- Karl Aspelin – Den förste målaren på Österlen, av Erland Aspelin, Malmströmer förlag, 2002.
- Lexikonett amanda och Kultur1
- Svensk uppslagsbok, Lund 1929
