= Johann Eck =

German Catholic theologian (1486–1543)

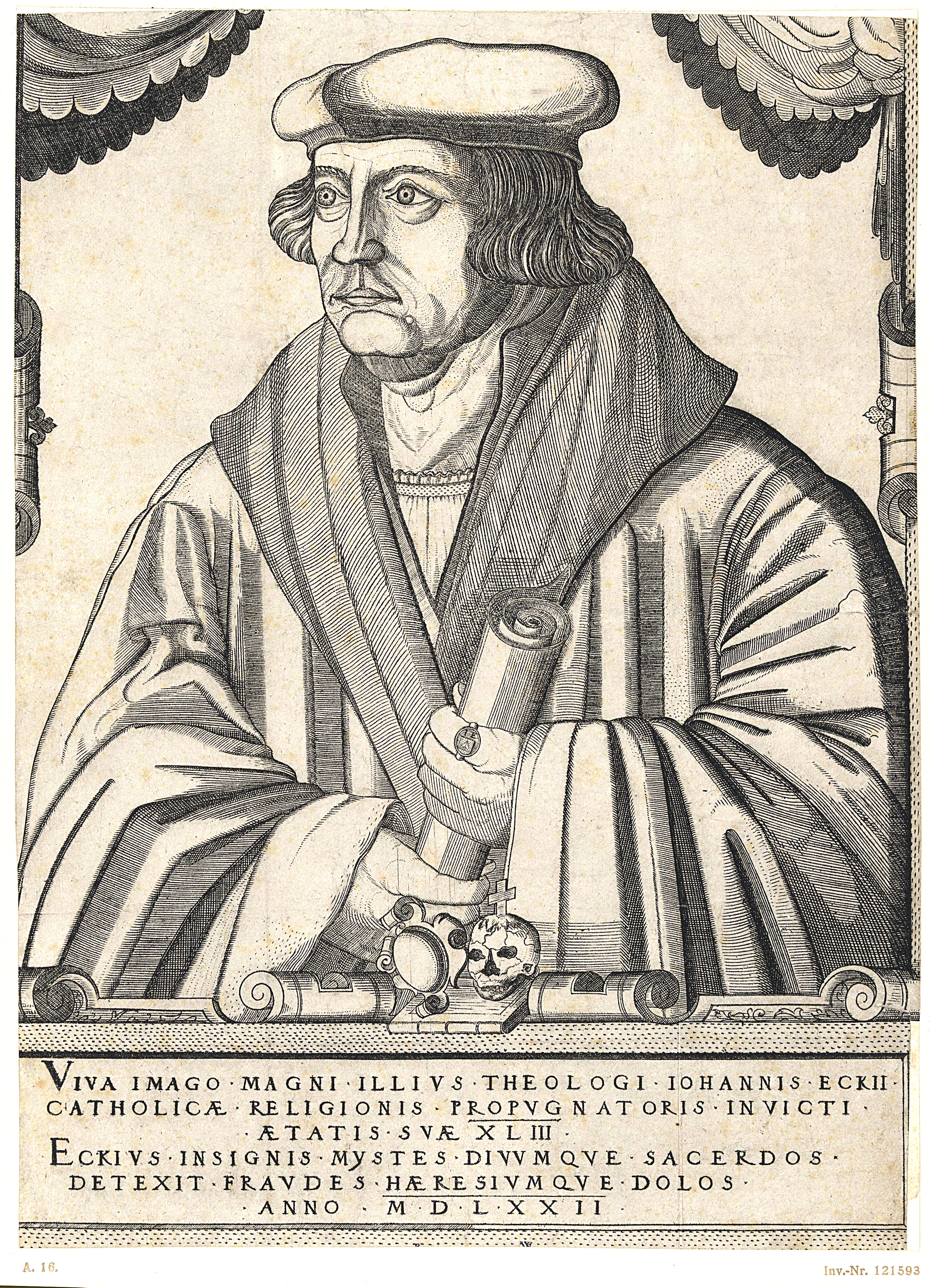
- Born: Johann Maier; 13 November 1486; Eck, Imperial Abbey of Ottobeuren, Holy Roman Empire
- Died: 10 February 1543 (aged 56); Ingolstadt, Duchy of Bavaria, Holy Roman Empire
- Occupations: German Scholastic theologian, Catholic prelate, and early counterreformer

Johann Eck (13 November 1486 – 10 February 1543), also known as Johann Maier von Eck and often anglicized as John Eck, was a German Roman Catholic theologian, scholastic, prelate, and opponent of Martin Luther.

== Life ==
Johann Eck was born Johann Maier at Eck (later Egg, near Memmingen, Swabia) and derived his additional surname from his birthplace, which he himself, after 1523, always modified into Eckius or Eccius, i.e. "of Eck". His father, Michael Maier, was a peasant and bailiff, or Amtmann, of the village. The boy's education was undertaken by his uncle, Martin Maier, parish priest at Rottenburg on the river Neckar.

At the age of 12 he entered the University of Heidelberg, which he left in the following year for Tübingen. After taking his master's degree in 1501, he began the study of theology under Johann Jakob Lempp, and studied the elements of Hebrew and political economy with Konrad Summenhart.

Johann Eck left Tübingen in 1501 on account of the plague and after a year at Cologne finally settled at Freiburg University, at first as a student of theology and law and later as a successful teacher where he was mentor to the prominent Anabaptist leader of Waldshut and Nikolsburg, Balthasar Hubmaier, and later retaining this relationship during their move to the University of Ingolstadt. In 1508, he entered the priesthood in Strasbourg and two years later obtained his doctorate in theology.

At Freiburg in 1506 he published his first work, Ludicra logices exercitamenta. At odds with his colleagues, he accepted a call to a theological chair at Ingolstadt in November 1510, also receiving a canonry at Eichstadt. In 1512, he became prochancellor at the university and made the institution a bulwark of Catholicism. In the theological field he produced his Chrysopassus (Augsburg, 1514), in which he developed a theory of predestination, and also commented on the Summulae of Peter of Spain and on Aristotle's De caelo and De anima.

As a political economist he defended the lawfulness of putting out capital at interest, arguing his view at disputations at Augsburg (1514), Bologna (1515), and Vienna in 1516 where he also disputed about predestination. Through these successes he gained the patronage of the Fuggers.

Between 1516 and 1520, in addition to all his other duties, he published commentaries on the Summulae of Petrus Hispanus, and on the Dialectics, Physics and lesser scientific works of Aristotle. During these early years, Eck was considered a modern theologian, and his commentaries were informed by the New Learning. His aim, however, had been to find a via media between old and new.

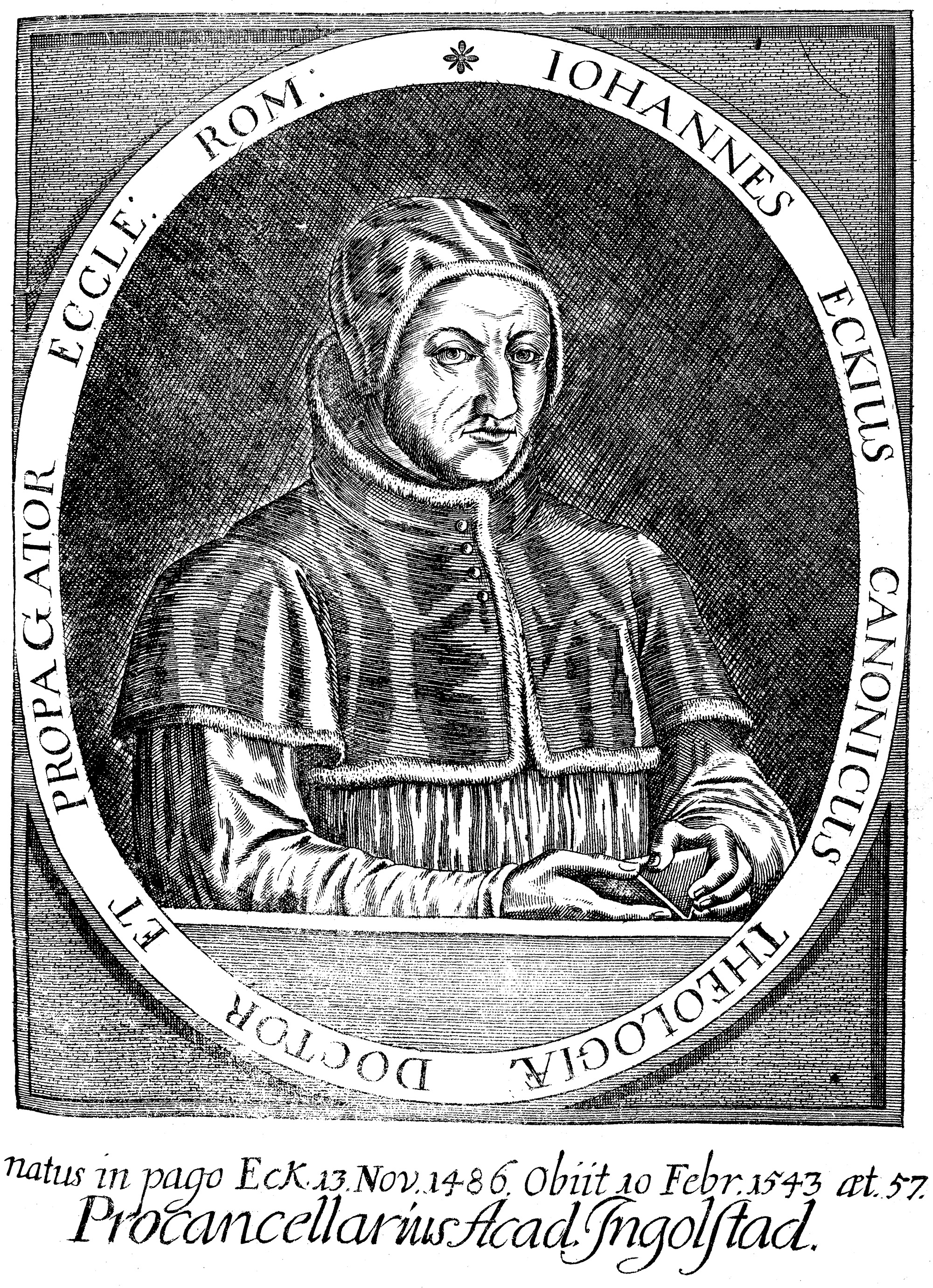
Portrait of Johann Eck (1717)

He championed the cause of the papacy, writing De primatu Petri in 1519, and his Enchiridion locorum communium adversus Lutherum ran through 46 editions between 1525 and 1576. From 1530 to 1535 he published a collection of his writings against Luther, Opera contra Ludderum, in 4 vols. He verbally assailed his friend, humanist and jurist Ulrich Zasius, for a doctrine proclaimed ten years before, and Erasmus's Annotationes in Novum Testamentum. Eck died at Ingolstadt on 10 February 1543.

== Disputations with Luther and Karlstadt ==
As early as the spring of 1517 Eck had entered into friendly relations with Martin Luther, who had regarded him as in harmony with his own views, but this relationship was short-lived. In his Obelisci, Eck attacked Luther's theses, which had been sent to him by Christoph von Scheurl, and accused him of promoting the "heresy of the Bohemian Brethren", fostering anarchy within the Church and branded him a Hussite. Luther replied in his Asterisci adversus obeliscos Eccii, while Andreas Karlstadt defended Luther's views of indulgences and engaged in a violent controversy with Eck.

A mutual desire for a public disputation led to a compact between Eck and Luther by which the former pledged himself to meet Karlstadt in debate at Erfurt or Leipzig, on condition that Luther abstain from all participation in the discussion. In December 1518, Eck published the twelve theses which he was prepared to uphold against Karlstadt, but since they were aimed at Luther rather than at the ostensible opponent, Luther addressed an open letter to Karlstadt, in which he declared himself ready to meet Eck in debate.

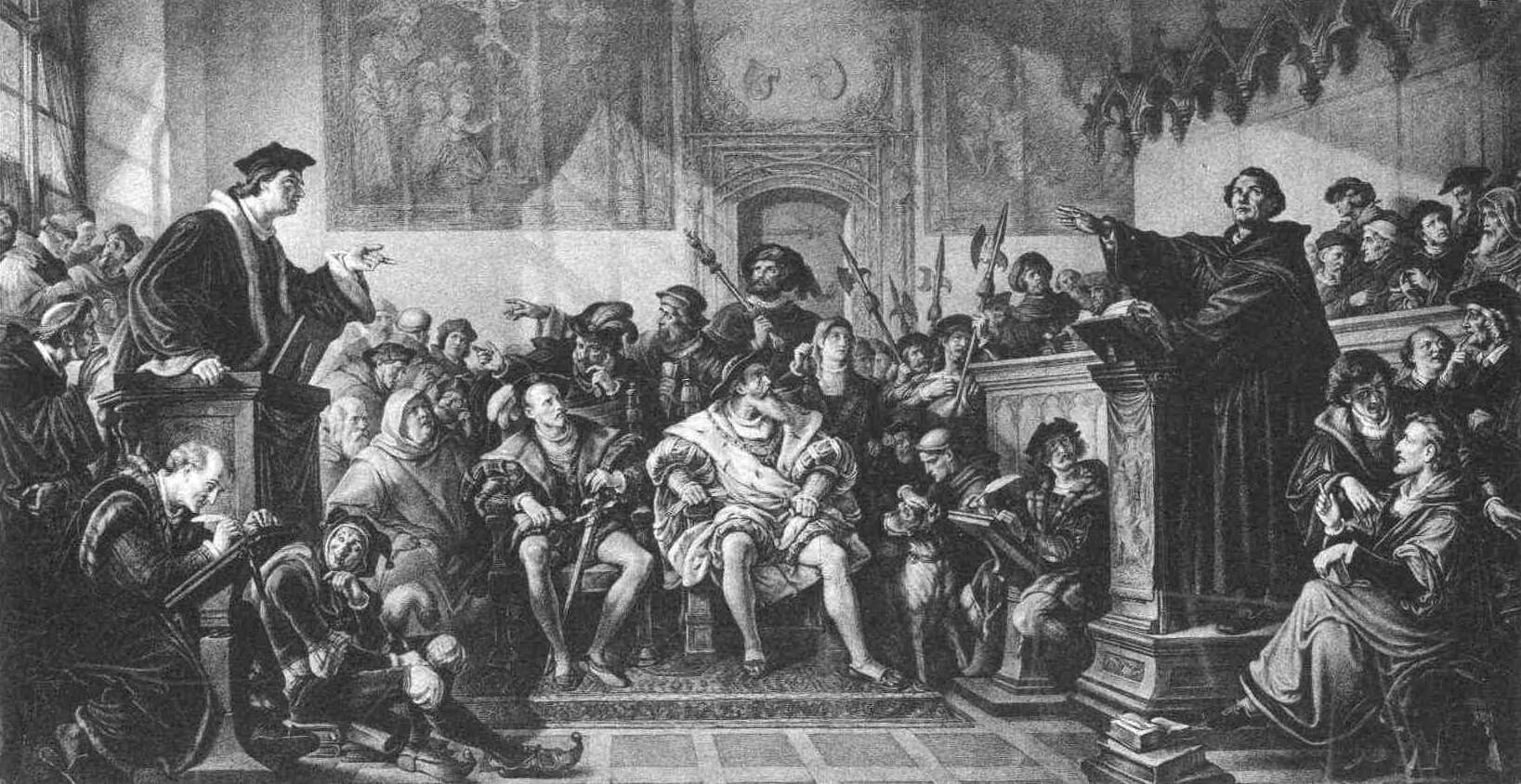
A depiction of Luther and Eck at the Leipzig Debate from the 1860s

The disputation between Eck and Karlstadt began at Leipzig on 27 June 1519. In the first four sessions Eck maintained the thesis that free will is the active agent in the creation of good works, but he was compelled by his opponent to modify his position so as to concede that the grace of God and free will work in harmony toward the common end. Karlstadt then proceeded to argue that good works are to be ascribed to the agency of God alone, whereupon Eck yielded so far as to admit that free will is passive in the beginning of conversion, although he maintained that in the course of time it enters into its rights; so that while the entirety of good works originates in God, their accomplishment is not entirely the work of God.

Despite the fact that Eck was thus virtually forced to abandon his position, he succeeded in confusing Karlstadt and carried off the victory. He was less successful against Luther, who, according to Eck, was his superior in memory, acumen, and learning. After a disputation on the supremacy of the papacy, purgatory, penance, etc., lasting twenty-three days (4 July–27 July), the arbitrators declined to give a verdict. Eck did succeed in making Luther admit that there was some truth in the Hussite opinions and declare himself against the Pope, but this success only embittered his animosity against his opponents. Eck also forced Luther to declare that Ecumenical Councils were sometimes errant, as in the case when Constance (1414–1418) condemned Jan Hus in 1415. Luther effectively denied the authority of both pope and council. Eck was greeted as victor by the theologians of the University of Leipzig.

== Attacks on Luther and Melanchthon ==
Soon after his return to Ingolstadt, Eck attempted to persuade Elector Frederick of Saxony to have Luther's works burned in public, and, in 1519, he published eight writings against the new movement. He failed, however, to obtain a condemnatory decision from the universities appointed to pronounce on the outcome of the Leipzig disputation. Erfurt returned the proceedings of the meeting to the Saxon duke without signifying its approval, while Paris, after repeated urging, gave an ambiguous decision limited to "the doctrine of Luther so far as investigated".

Eck's only followers were the aged heretic-hunter Hoogstraten and Emser of Leipzig, together with the allied authorities of the universities of Cologne and Leuven. Luther returned Eck's assaults with more than equal vehemence and about this time Philipp Melanchthon wrote to Œcolampadius that at Leipzig he had first become distinctly aware of the difference between what he considered to be true Christian theology and the scholasticism of the Aristotelian doctors. In his Excusatio, Eck retorted that Melanchthon knew nothing of theology, a claim Melanchthon responded to in his reply.

Eck fared even worse in October 1519 when he sought to aid Emser with a strongly worded tirade against Luther. Two satires, one by Œcolampadius and the other by Willibald Pirckheimer, angered Eck who pushed for the public burning of the entire literature in the market-place at Ingolstadt, an act from which he was restrained by his colleague Reuchlin.

== Papal emissary and inquisitor ==
Johann Eck was more highly esteemed in Rome than in Germany, where he induced the universities of Cologne and Louvain to condemn Luther's writings, but failed to enlist the German princes. In January 1520, he visited Italy at the invitation of Pope Leo X, to whom he presented his latest work De primate Petri adversus Ludderum (Ingolstadt, 1520) for which he was rewarded with the nomination to the office of papal protonotary, although his efforts to urge the Curia to decisive action against Luther were unsuccessful for some time.

In July he returned to Germany with the bull Exsurge Domine directed against Luther's writings, in which forty-one propositions of Luther were condemned as heretical or erroneous. He now believed himself in a position to crush not only the "Lutheran heretics", but also his humanist critics. The effect of the publication of the bull, however, made this difficult. Universities and humanists were at one in denunciation of the outrage; and, due the attitude of the people, Eck was barely able to escape from Saxony alive.

At Meissen, Brandenburg, and Merseburg, he succeeded in giving the papal measure due official publicity, but at Leipzig he was the object of the ridicule of the student body and was compelled to flee by night to Freiberg, where he was again prevented from proclaiming the bull. At Erfurt the students tore the bull down and threw it into the water, while in other places the papal decree was subjected to still greater insults.

In his anger he appealed to force, and his Epistola ad Carolum V (18 February 1521) called on the emperor to take measures against Luther, an appeal soon answered by the Edict of Worms (May 1521). In 1521 and 1522 Eck was again in Rome, reporting on the results of his nunciature. On his return from his second visit he was the prime mover in the promulgation of the Bavarian religious edict of 1522, which practically established the senate of the University of Ingolstadt as a tribunal of the Inquisition. In return for this action of the duke, who had at first been opposed to the policy of repression, Eck obtained for him, during a third visit to Rome in 1523, valuable ecclesiastical concessions. He continued unabated in his zeal against the reformers, publishing eight major works from 1522 to 1526.

Wealth and power were included in the aspirations of Eck. He appropriated the revenues of his parish of Günzburg, while he relegated its duties to a vicar. Twice he visited Rome as a diplomatic representative of the Bavarian court to obtain sanction for the establishment of a court of inquisition against the Lutheran teachings at Ingolstadt. The first of these journeys, late in the autumn of 1521, was fruitless on account of the death of Leo X, but his second journey two years later, in 1523, was successful. Eck was the prime mover in many heresy trials, including that of Leonhard Kaiser, whose history was published by Luther.

== Zwingli and his followers ==
In addition to his inquisitorial duties, every year witnessed the publication of one or more writings against iconoclasm and in defense of the doctrines of the Mass, purgatory, and auricular confession. His Enchiridion locorum communium adversus Lutherum et alios hostes ecclesiae (Landshut, 1525) went through forty-six editions before 1576. As its title indicates, it was directed primarily against Melanchthon's Loci Communes, although it also concerned itself to some extent with the teachings of Huldrych Zwingli.

At Baden-in-Aargau from 21 May until 18 June 1526 a public disputation on the doctrine of transubstantiation was held, in which Eck and Thomas Murner were pitted against Johann Oecolampadius. The affair ended decidedly in favor of Eck, who induced the authorities to enter on a course of active persecution of Zwingli and his followers (Conference of Baden).

The effect of his victory at Baden was dissipated, however, at the Bern Disputation (January 1528), where the propositions advanced by the Reformers were debated in the absence of Eck, and Bern, Basel, and other places were definitely won for the Reformation. At the Diet of Augsburg (1530), Eck played the leading part among the Roman Catholic theologians.

== Peace overtures ==
For the Diet of Augsburg, while still at Ingolstadt, Eck compiled what he considered to be 404 heretical propositions from the writings of the reformers as an aid to Charles V, Holy Roman Emperor.

At Augsburg he was charged by the Emperor to draw up, in concert with twenty other theologians, a refutation of the Lutheran Augsburg Confession, which had been delivered to the emperor on 25 June 1530, but he had to rewrite it five times before it suited the emperor. It was known as the Confutatio pontificia, embodying the Catholic reaction to the reformers. He also was involved in the fruitless negotiations with the Protestant theologians, including Philipp Melanchthon, that took place at Augsburg; Eck with Wimpina and Cochlæus met the Lutherans in August.

He was at the Colloquy of Worms in 1540 where he showed some signs of a willingness to compromise. In January 1541 he renewed these efforts and succeeded in impressing Melanchthon as being prepared to give his assent to the main principles of the reformers, e.g. justification by faith; but at the diet of Regensburg in the spring and summer of 1541, he reasserted his opposition. Afterwards Eck clashed with Martin Bucer over the latter's published report of the diet.

== Eck's German New Testament ==
Eck produced a German translation of the Bible (the New Testament, a revision of H. Emser's rendering) which was first published at Ingolstadt in 1537.

== Eck and the genealogy of Christ ==
Eck made a sermon on the genealogy of Christ, naming Mary's mother's parents as Emerentia and Stollanus: "The renowned Father John of Eck of Ingolstadt, in a sermon on St. Anne (published at Paris in 1579), pretends to know even the names of the parents St. Anne. He calls them Stollanus and Emerentia. He says that St. Anne was born after Stollanus and Emerentia had been childless for twenty years".

== Eck and the Jews ==
In 1541 Eck published his Against the Defense of the Jews (German: Ains Juden-büechlins Verlegung). In it he opposes the position of the Nuremberg reformer Andreas Osiander, who in the pamphlet Whether It Be True and Credible That the Jews Secretly Strangulate Christian Children and Make Use of Their Blood wanted to quash medieval suspicion that Jews were responsible for killing Christian children, desecrating the eucharistic Host, and poisoning wells. Eck accused Osiander of being a "Jew-protector" and "Jew-father", and no fewer than nineteen times reviled the Jews, and called them "a blasphemous race".

== Works ==
- Eckius, Joannes (1536), Enchiridion locorum communium adversus Lutherum et alios hostes ecclesiae (in Latin).
- Eck, Johannes; Smeling, Tilmann, Fraenkel, Pierre (ed.), Enchiridion locorum communium adversus Lutherum et alios hostes ecclesiae [Enchiridion (i.e., handbook or manual) of Commonplaces against Luther and other Enemies of the Church: with the additions by Tilmann Smeling], Corpus Catholicorum: Werke katholischer Schriftsteller im Zeitalter der Glaubensspaltung. Works of Catholic authors in the Time of the Splitting of the Faith (in Latin), vol. 34, pp. 1525–2543.
- Battles, Ford Lewis (transl.) (1979), Enchiridion of Commonplaces against Luther and other Enemies of the Church, Grand Rapids, MI: Baker Book House (Twin Brooks Series), ISBN 978-0-8010-3352-0.
- Eck, Johann (1538), Explanatio Psalmi vigesimi, ed., Bernhard Walde, 1928, Münster in Westfalen: Aschendorff.

== See also ==
- Albert of Mainz
- Girolamo Aleandro
- Bartholomaeus Arnoldi von Usingen
- Gabriel Biel
- Thomas Cajetan
- Peter Canisius
- Johann Cochlaeus
- Johann Crotus (Crotus Rubianus)
- Jerome Emser
- John Fisher
- Hochstratus Ovans
- Jacob van Hoogstraten
- John Mair
- Karl von Miltitz
- Thomas More
- Thomas Murner
- William of Ockham
- Ortwin
- Johannes Pfefferkorn
- Johann Reuchlin
- Caspar Schatzgeyer
- Johann Tetzel
- Georg Witzel
