= Corpus Catholicorum =

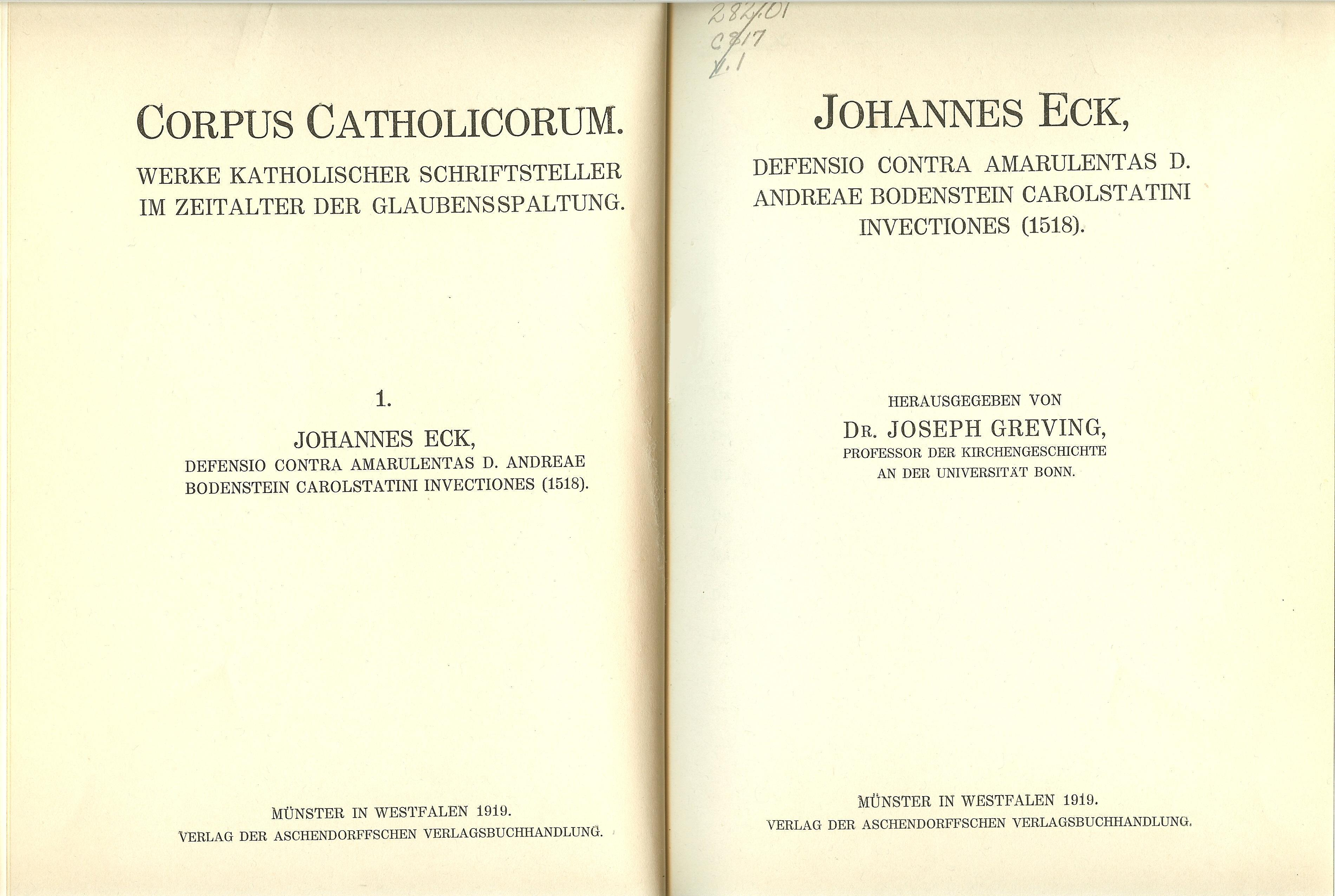
Title pages to volume 1Corpus Catholicorum.

The Corpus Catholicorum (Corp. Cath., CCath., or CC) is a collection of sixteenth-century writings by the leading proponents and defenders of the Roman Catholic Church against the teachings of the Protestant reformers.

The full title of the series is: Corpus Catholicorum: Werke katholischer Schriftsteller im Zeitalter der Glaubensspaltung, i.e., Body of Catholic [writings]: Works of Catholic authors in the Time of the Splitting of the Faith.

The series, intended as a counterpart to the Corpus Reformatorum, was conceived in 1915 by Professor Joseph Greving (1868–1919) of the University of Bonn, and was announced that same year in the Theologische Revue as a "Plan für ein Corpus Catholicorum" or "Plan for a Corpus Catholicorum."

== List of volumes in the Corpus Catholicorum ==
Each volume is listed with its editor, followed by its contents. Volumes 1–13 are freely accessible. Unless otherwise stated, all volumes were published at Münster in Westfalen by Verlag der Aschendorffschen Verlagsbuchhandlung.

- Vol. 1. Joseph Greving, S.J., ed. (1919). HathiTrust. Google Books.
  - Johann Eck. Defensio contra amarulentas D. Andreae Bodenstein Carolstatini invectiones (1518).
- Vol. 2. Johannes Metzler, S.J. ed. (1921). HathiTrust.
  - Johann Eck, Epistola de Ratione Studiorum Suorum (1538).
  - Erasmus Wolph, De Orbitu Ioan. Eckii Adversus Calumniam Viti Theodorici (1543).
- Vol. 3. Joseph Schweizer, ed. (1920). Internet Archive. Google Books. HathiTrust.
  - Johann Cochlaeus. Adversus cucullatum minotaurum wittenbergensem: De sacramentorum gratia iterum, (1523).
- Vol. 4. Franz Xaver Thurnhofer, ed. (1921). HathiTrust.
  - Jerome Emser (Hieronymus Emser), De disputatione Lipsicensi, quantum ad Boemos obiter deflexa est (1519).
  - A Venatione Luteriana Aegocerotis Assertio (1519).
- Vol. 5. Ulrich Schmidt, O.F.M., ed. (1922). HathiTrust. HathiTrust (vols. 5–7).
  - Kaspar Schatzgeyer, O.F.M., Scrutinium Divinae Scripturae pro conciliatione dissidentium dogmatum (1522).
- Vol. 6. Therese Virnich, ed. (1923). HathiTrust. HathiTrust (vols. 5–7).
  - Johann Eck, Disputatio Viennae Pannoniae habita (1517).
- Vol. 7. Friedrich Hünermann, ed. (1923). Google Books. HathiTrust (vols. 5–7).
  - Card. Gasparo Contarini, Gegenreformatorische schriften (ca. 1530–1542).
- Vol. 8. Leonhard Keil (1924). HathiTrust. Google Books (vols. 8 & 9).
  - Bartholomaeus Latomus, Zwei streitschriften gegen Martin Bucer (1543–1543).
- Vol. 9. Hermann Klein Schmeink, ed. (1925). HathiTrust. Google Books (only vol. 9). Google Books (vols. 8 & 9).
  - St. John Fisher, Sacri sacerdotii defensio contra Lutherum (1525).
- Vol. 10. Friedrich Lauchert, ed. (1925). Google Books.
  - Card. Thomas de Vio Cajetan, O.P., De divina institutione pontificatus Romani pontificis (1521).
- Vol. 11. (1926). HathiTrust. HathiTrust (vols. 11 & 12). Google Books.
  - Augustin von Alfeld, O.F.M., Wyder den Wittenbergischen abgot Martin Luther (1524), ed. by Käthe Büschgens.
  - Idem, Erklärung des Salve Regina (1527), ed. by Fr. Leonhard Lemmens, O.F.M.
- Vol. 12. Fr. Patricius Schlager, O.F.M. (1927). HathiTrust (vols. 11 & 12).
  - Nicolaus Herborn, O.F.M., Locorum communium adversus huius temporis haereses enchiridion (1529).
- Vol. 13. Bernhard Walde, ed. (1928). HathiTrust.
  - Johann Eck, Explanatio Psalmi vigesimi (1538).
- Vol. 34. Pierre Fraenkel, ed. (1979). ISBN 978-3-402-03182-7.
  - Johann Eck, Enchiridion locorum communium adversus Lutherum et alios hostes ecclesiae; mit den Zusätzen von Tilmann Smeling [Enchiridion (i.e., handbook or manual) of Commonplaces against Luther and other Enemies of the Church; with additions by Tilmann Smeling].
- Vol. 43. Pierre Fraenkel, ed. (1992), ISBN 3-402-03457-3 ISBN 9783402034576.
  - Henry VIII, Assertio septem sacramentorum adversus Martinum Lutherum.
- Vols. 45–48. Sr. Ursula Dirmeier, C.J., ed. (2007).
  - Mary Ward und ihre Gründung: Die Quellentexte bis 1645 (Mary Ward and Her Foundation: The Source Texts to 1645), 4 vols.
    - Vol. 45. ISBN 978-3-402-03459-0 ISBN 340203459X.
    - Vol. 46. ISBN 978-3-402-03460-6 ISBN 3402034603.
    - Vol. 47. ISBN 978-3-402-03461-3 ISBN 3402034611.
    - Vol. 48. ISBN 978-3-402-03462-0 ISBN 340203462X.
