= Colloquy of Worms =

Colloquy of Worms may refer to either of two meetings of Catholics and Protestants held in Worms, Germany, during the Reformation:

- Colloquy of Worms (1540–1541)
- Colloquy of Worms (1557)
