= Johann Cochlaeus =

German humanist and music theorist (1479–1552)

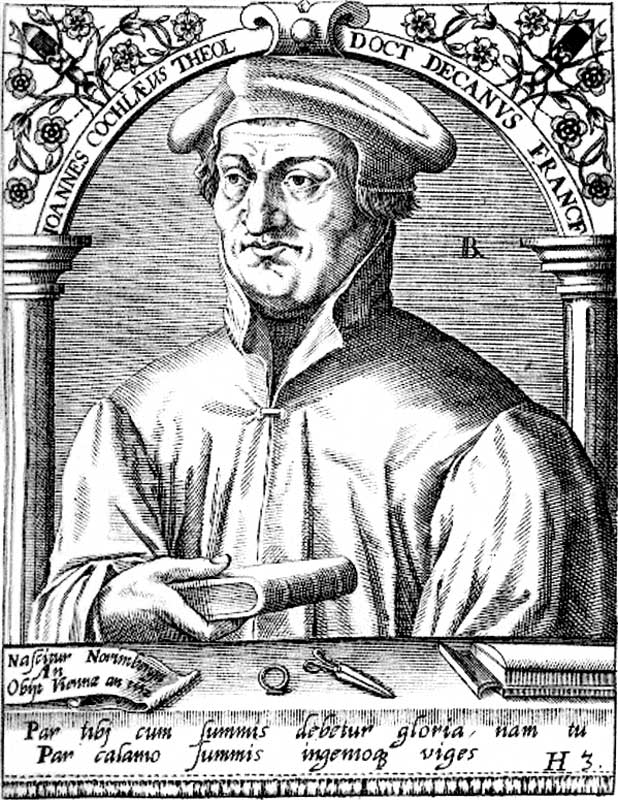
Johann Cochlaeus.

Johann Cochlaeus (Cochläus) (1479 – 10 January 1552) was a German humanist, music theorist, and controversialist.

== Life ==
Originally Johann Dobneck, he was born of poor parents at Wendelstein (near Nuremberg), from which he obtained the punning surname Cochlaeus, for which he occasionally substituted Wendelstinus. Educated at Nuremberg by the humanist Heinrich Grieninger, he entered the University of Cologne in 1504, and there associated with Hermann von Neuenahr, Ulrich von Hutten, and other humanists. He also knew well Carl von Miltitz, who later became papal chamberlain. In 1507 he graduated; he left Cologne in May 1510 to become schoolmaster at Nuremberg, where he brought out several school manuals. He served as the rector of the Lateinschule (Latin school) in Nuremberg.

During the years 1515 to 1519 he traveled in Italy as tutor to three nephews of Willibald Pirkheimer. In 1515 he was at Bologna, hearing (with disgust) Eck's disputation on the subject of usury, and associating with von Hutten among the humanists. He took his doctor's degree at Ferrara (1517), and spent some time in Rome, where he was ordained priest.

In 1520 he became dean of the Liebfrauenkirche at Frankfurt. He maintained good relations with the episcopal court of Mainz and with Hieronymus Aleander of Worms, who applied to him for the purpose of a discussion on the best means of opposing Martin Luther. Cochlaeus became a controversialist against the Lutherans. He was present at the Diets of Worms (1521), and later at Speyer (1526 and 1529), Augsburg (1530) and Regensburg (1541).

In the autumn of 1523 he went to Rome as he did not feel safe at Frankfurt, but returned early in 1524. Meanwhile, his patrons and friends at Frankfurt had joined the reformers. Cochlaeus accompanied Lorenzo Campeggio, the papal nuncio in Holy Roman Empire, to the Convention of Regensburg as interpreter and member of the commission which discussed the reform of the clergy. His position at Frankfurt becoming untenable during the German Peasants' War, he fled to Cologne in 1525, and in 1526 received a canonry at St. Victor's in Mainz. He attended the Diet of Speyer in 1526, but his hope of holding a disputation with Luther was not fulfilled. In 1529 he became secretary to George, Duke of Saxony, at Dresden and Meissen. The death of his patron (1539) compelled him to take flight. In September 1539 he became canon at Breslau, where he died.

== Works ==
Cochlaeus was a prolific writer and a feared opponent, who attracted very little sympathy from any side. Though he himself was Catholic, his humanist ideas raised the suspicion of many Catholics, and his polemical writings won him the hatred of the Reformers.

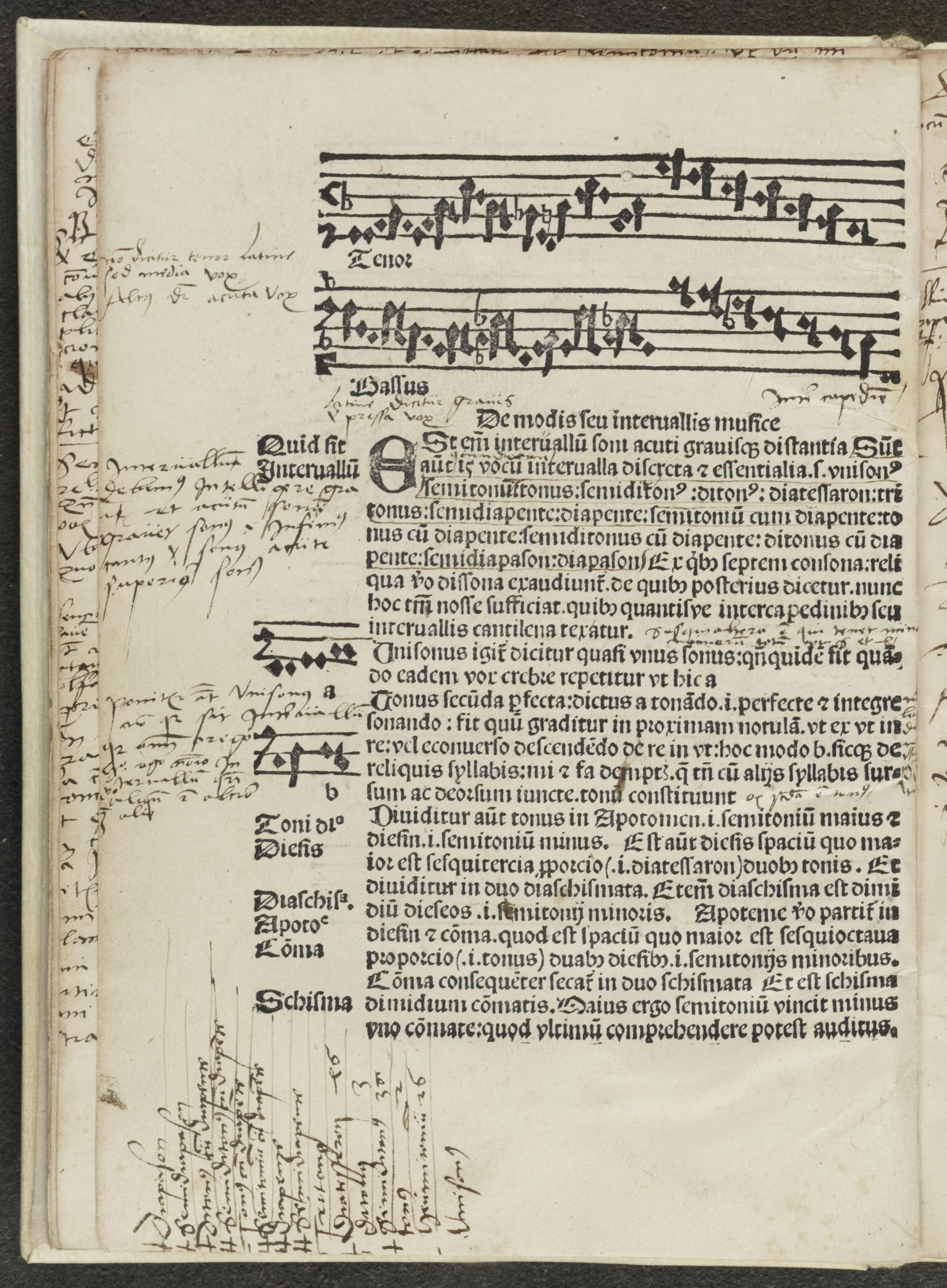
Leaf from Johannes Cochlaeus' Musica, 1507. From the Rosenwald Collection, Library of Congress.

He published under the name of Wendelstein his first piece, Musica (1507). His first theological works were De Utroque Sacerdotio (1520) and some smaller writings published in rapid succession. In During the following years he wrote tracts against Luther's principal theses on the doctrine of justification, on the freedom of the will, and on Catholic teaching in De Gratia Sacramentorum, 1522; De Baptismo parvulorum, 1523; A commentary on 154 Articles and others. Luther engaged with Cochlæus only in a single work, Adversus Armatum Virum Cocleum.

In his Colloqium Cochlaei cum Luthero, Cochlaeus reported on his discussion with Luther on 24 April 1521 about issues, such as the origin of Luther's doctrine of predestination, the Eucharist, and the authority of the Bible. (See Plowboy trope.) After writing a series of pamphlets discussing the main themes of Luther's theology, Cochlaeus became convinced that any further argumentation with Luther was futile. Accordingly, instead of convincing Luther, Cochlaeus attempted to come to an agreement with Melanchthon at the Diet of Augsburg in 1530, but without much success.

His historical biography of Luther was popular and influential. It became a model and source for later polemics, and the view expounded in it that the Protestant Reformation was nothing but an incidental jealousy between the Dominican and Augustinian orders had a wide circulation.

He left one of the few contemporary notices of the young Michael Servetus as well as notes on Tyndale's abortive attempt to print his New Testament at Cologne in 1525.
