= Jerome Emser =

German theologian and antagonist of Martin Luther (1477–1527)

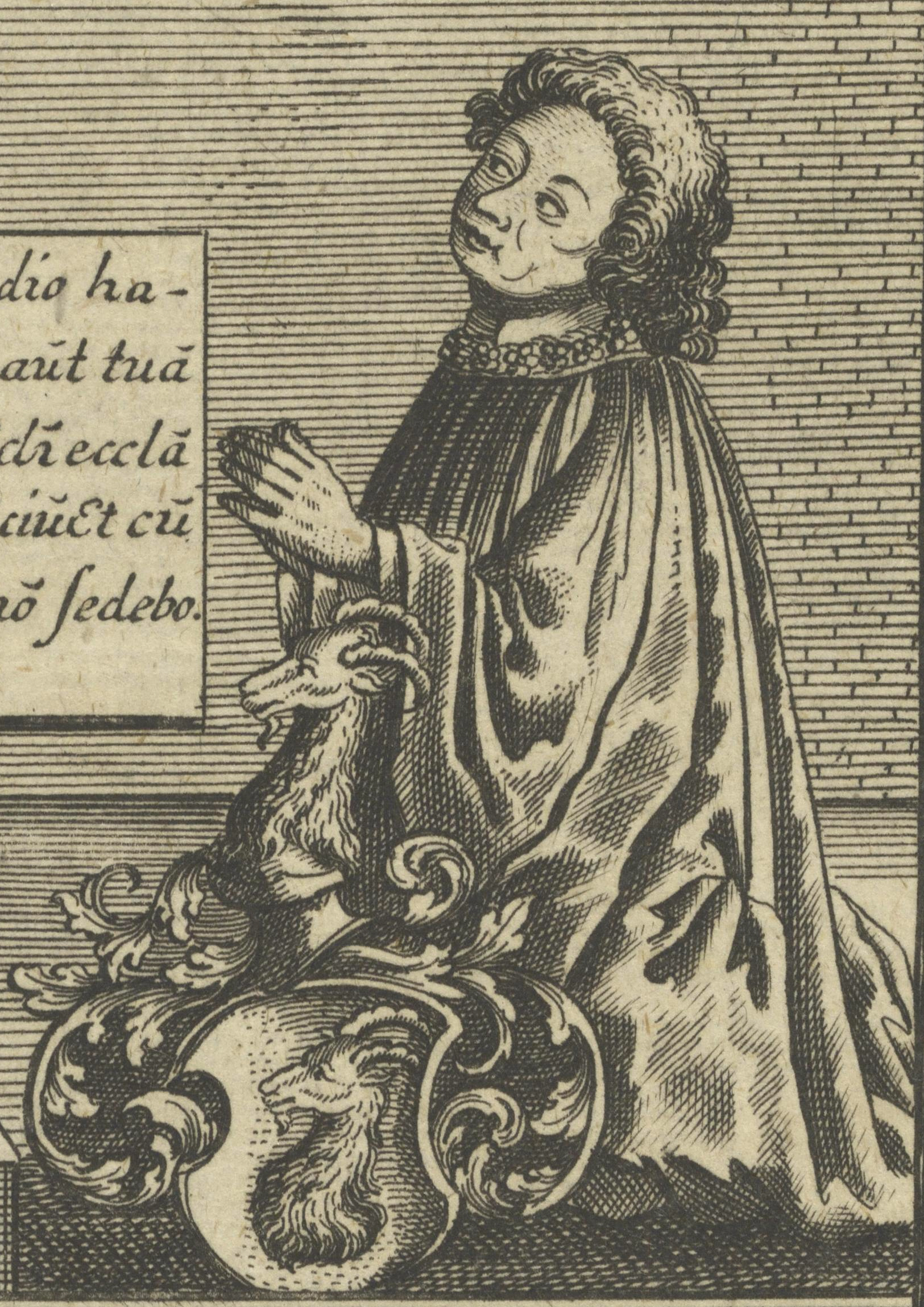
Jerome (or Hieronymus) Emser

Jerome (or Hieronymus) Emser (March 20, 1477 – November 8, 1527), was a German theologian and antagonist of Martin Luther, was born of a good family at Ulm.

He studied Greek at Tübingen and jurisprudence at Basel, and after acting for three years as chaplain and secretary to Raymond Peraudi, cardinal of Gurk, he began lecturing on classics in 1504 at Erfurt, where Luther may have been among his audience. In the same year he became secretary to Duke George of Albertine Saxony, who, unlike his cousin Frederick the Wise, the elector of Ernestine Saxony, remained the stanchest defender of Roman Catholicism among the princes of northern Germany.

Duke George at this time was bent on securing the canonization of Bishop Benno of Meissen, and at his instance Emser travelled through Saxony and Bohemia in search of materials for a life of Benno, which he subsequently published in German and Latin. In pursuit of the same object he made an unsuccessful visit to Rome in 1510. Meanwhile, he had also been lecturing on classics at Leipzig, but gradually turned his attention to theology and canon law. A prebend at Dresden (1509) and another at Meissen, which he obtained through Duke George's influence, gave him means and leisure to pursue his studies.

At first Emser was on the side of the reformers, but like his patron he desired a practical reformation of the clergy without any doctrinal breach with the past or the church; and his liberal sympathies were mainly humanistic, like those of Erasmus and others who parted company with Luther after 1519. As late as that year Luther referred to him as "Emser noster," but the Leipzig Debate in that year completed the breach between them.

Emser warned his Bohemian friends against Luther, and Luther retorted with an attack on Emser which outdid in scurrility all his polemical writings. Emser, who was further embittered by an attack of the Leipzig students, imitated Luther's violence, and asserted that Luther's whole crusade originated in nothing more than enmity to the Dominicans, Luther's reply was to burn Emser's books along with Leo X's bull of excommunication.

Emser next, in 1521, published an attack on Luther's Appeal to the German Nobility, and eight works followed from his pen in the controversy, in which he defended the Roman doctrine of the Mass and the primacy of the pope. At Duke George's instance he prepared, in 1523, a German translation of Henry VIII's Assertio Septem Sacramentorum contra Lutherum, and criticized Luther's New Testament. He also entered into a controversy with Zwingli. He took an active part in organizing a reformed Roman Catholic Church in Germany, and in 1527 published a German version of the New Testament as a counterblast to Luther's. He died on the 8th of November in that year and was buried at Dresden.

Emser was a vigorous controversialist, and next to Eck the most eminent of the German divines who stood by the old church. But he was hardly a great scholar; the errors he detected in Luther's New Testament were for the most part legitimate variations from the Vulgate, and his own version is merely Luther's adapted to Vulgate requirements.

Emser's crest was a goat's head and Luther delighted in calling him "Bock-Emser" and "Ægoceros".

== Works ==
- De disputatione Lipsicensi, quantum ad Boemos obiter deflexa est, (1519) - Corpus Catholicorum, Vol. 4, Dr. Franz Xaver Thurnhofer, ed., Munster in Westfalen, 1921 - HathiTrust.
- A Venatione Luteriana Aegocerotis Assertio, (1519) - Corpus Catholicorum, Vol. 4.

== Bibliography ==
- Bagchi, David V. N. Luther's Earliest Opponents: Catholic Controversialists, 1518-1525. Minneapolis: Fortress Press, 1991. passim.
- Collins, David. "Bursfelders, Humanists, and the Rhetoric of Sainthood: The Late Medieval vitae of Saint Benno." Revue Bénédictine 111 (2001): 508-556.
- Waldau, Nachricht von Hieronymus Emsers Leben und Schriften (Anspach, 1783)
- Kawerau, Hieronymus Emser (Halle, 1898)
- Enders, Luther und Emser (Halle, 1890–92)
- Akten und Briefe zur Kirchenpolitik Herzog Georgs von Sachsen (Leipzig, 1905)
- Allgemeine deutsche Biographie, vi. 96-98 (1877)

All histories of the Reformation in Germany contain notices of Emser; see especially Friedensburg, Beiträge zum Briefwechsel der hat holischen Gelehrten Deutschlands im Reformations zeitaller.
