= Jan van Essen and Hendrik Vos =

Dutch Augustinian monks and the first Lutheran martyrs, executed in 1523

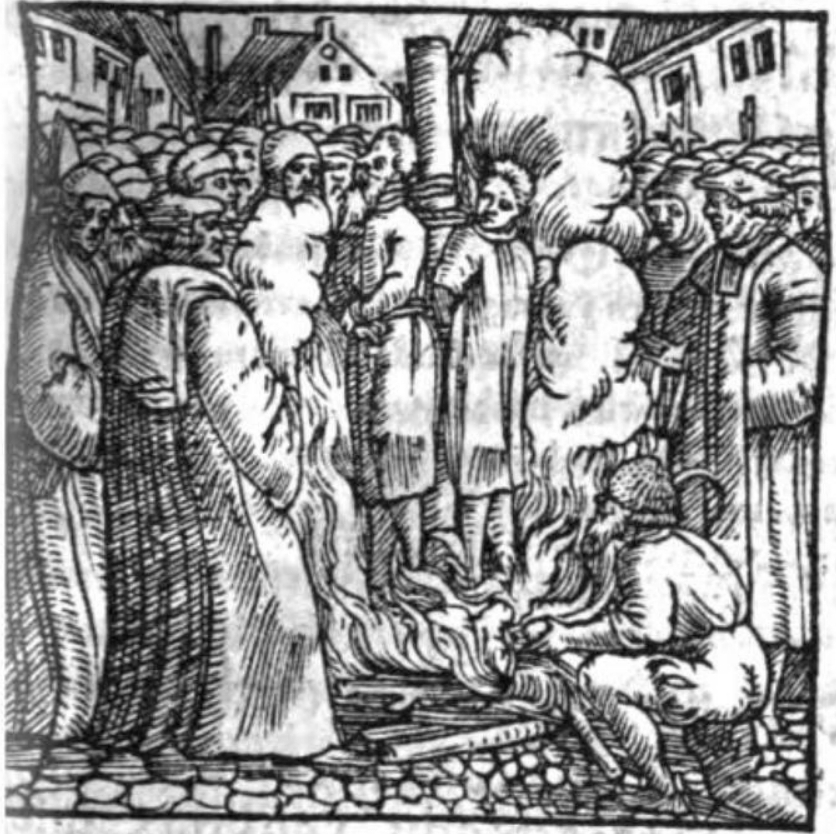
The execution of Jan van Essen and Hendrik Vos

Jan van Essen and Hendrik Vos or Voes, were the first two Lutheran martyrs, executed by the Council of Brabant for their adherence to Reformation doctrine. They were burned at the stake in Brussels on 1 July 1523.

== Background ==
Essen and Vos were friars of the Order of Saint Augustine resident at the Augustinian priory in Antwerp, now St. Andrew's Church. When in 1522 all the friars there publicly professed Lutheran doctrine, the Bishop of Cambrai had them all arrested and imprisoned in Vilvoorde, where they were interrogated by the Flemish inquisitor Jacob van Hoogstraten, who ordinarily resided in Cologne, and some dependably Catholic professors. When the friars realized that they risked being burned alive if they did not recant, all except three—Jan van Essen, Hendrik Vos, and Lampertus Thorn—recanted. Those who recanted were released but were not returned to regular monastic life in the priory, which instead was declared defiled, and defrocked.

== Refusal to recant ==
Van Essen, Vos, and Thorn, still held in custody, were questioned again by the ecclesiastical inquisition court, but they refused to recant. They were then handed over to the secular court and sentenced to death. They were taken to Brussels and held until the appointed day of execution on 1 July 1523. New attempts were made meanwhile to get them to renounce. Vos was brought first to the inquisitors, but he refused to recant. Van Essen also refused to renounce Lutheranism. Thorn asked for an additional four-day period to study the scriptures with respect to his views, and thus he was not executed with van Essen and Vos. Van Essen and Vos were summarily delivered to the executioner, brought to the Grand-Place/Grote Markt (main square) in Brussels, and burned alive. For some reason, the charges against them were not read aloud as was the established practice. It has been conjectured that the authorities were concerned that hearing the charges might cause Lutheran ideas to spread among the public witnesses or that the ideas were already there and would ignite a protest. Thorn was spared death and instead sent to prison for an additional five years, dying in prison in 1528.

== Luther's response ==
On learning of the execution of van Essen and Vos, Martin Luther wrote what is thought to be his first hymn, "Ein neues Lied wir heben an" ("A new song we raise") which was printed in the Erfurt Enchiridion of 1524. This is generally known in English as John C. Messenger's translation by the first line and title "Flung to the Heedless Winds" and sung to the tune of Ibstone composed in 1875 by Maria C. Tiddeman or to that of Denby composed in 1904 by Charles J. Dale.

== See also ==
- List of hymns by Martin Luther
