= Hochstratus Ovans =

1520 dialogue published in Cologne

Hochstratus Ovans is a dialogue published in Cologne in 1520 referring to Jacob van Hoogstraten. In it, Johann Maier Eck and Girolamo Aleandro are reproached for burning Martin Luther's books.

Martin Bucer had read the pamphlet and suspected who the author was, which he reported in a letter to Wolfgang Capito in November 1520. This again is mentioned in a letter from Capito to Martin Luther, December 4, 1520.

The full title is Hochstratus Ovans, Dialogus Festivissimus, or Hochstratus Rejoicing: A Very Lively Dialogue.
