= Christoph von Scheurl =

German writer (1481–1542)

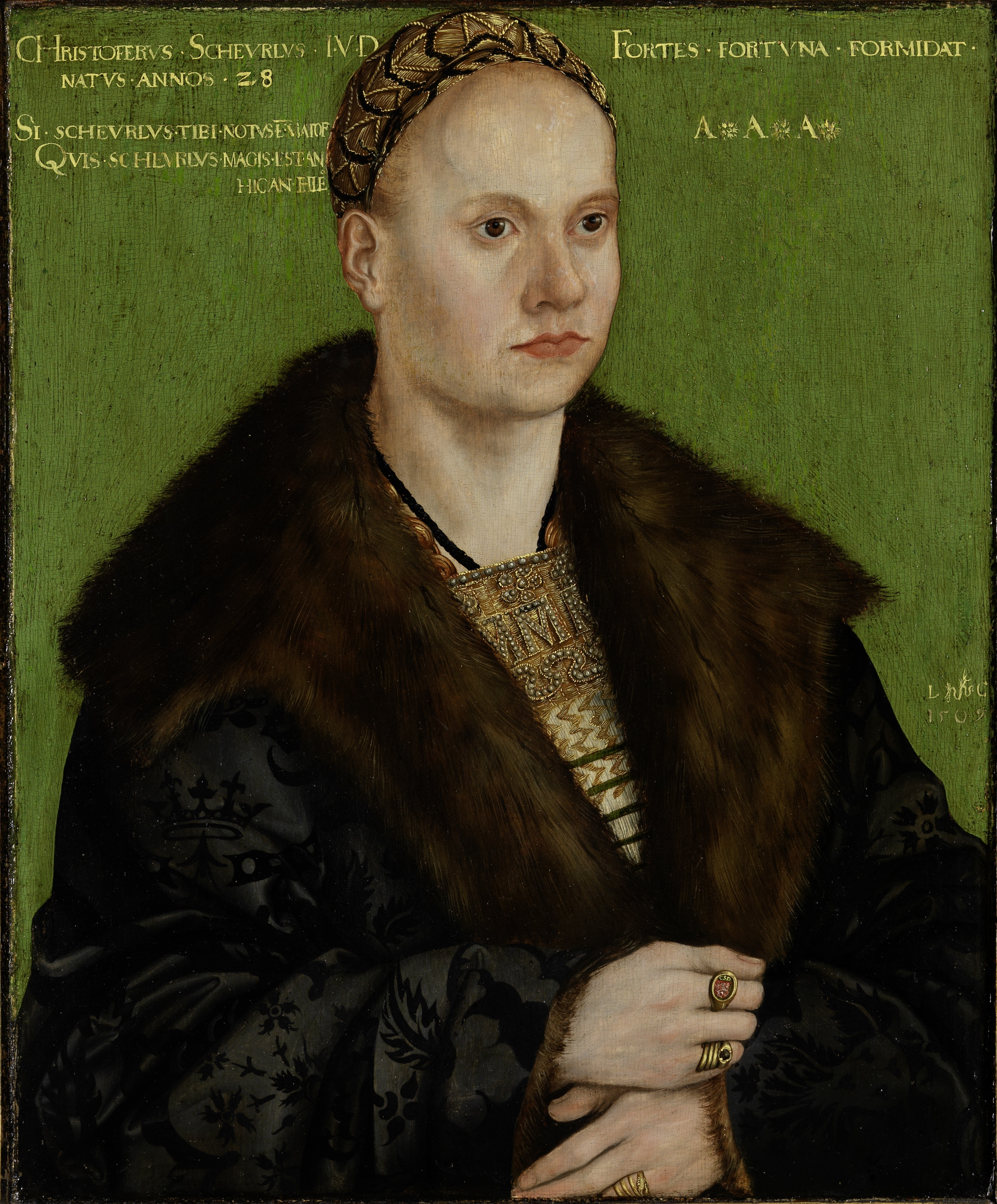
Christoph von Scheurl, portrait by Cranach the Elder

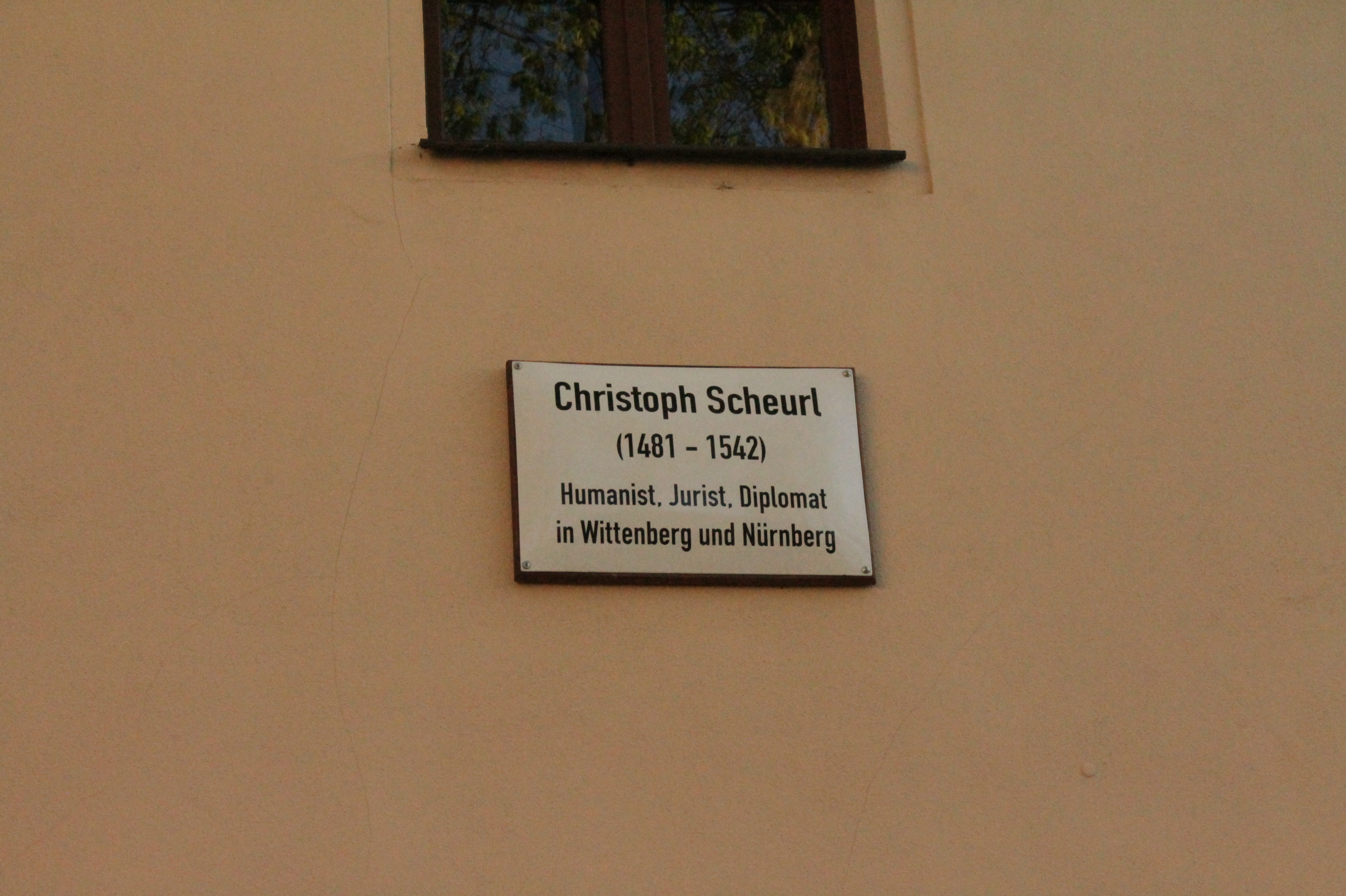
Plaque to Christoph Scheurl, quadrangle of Wittenberg University

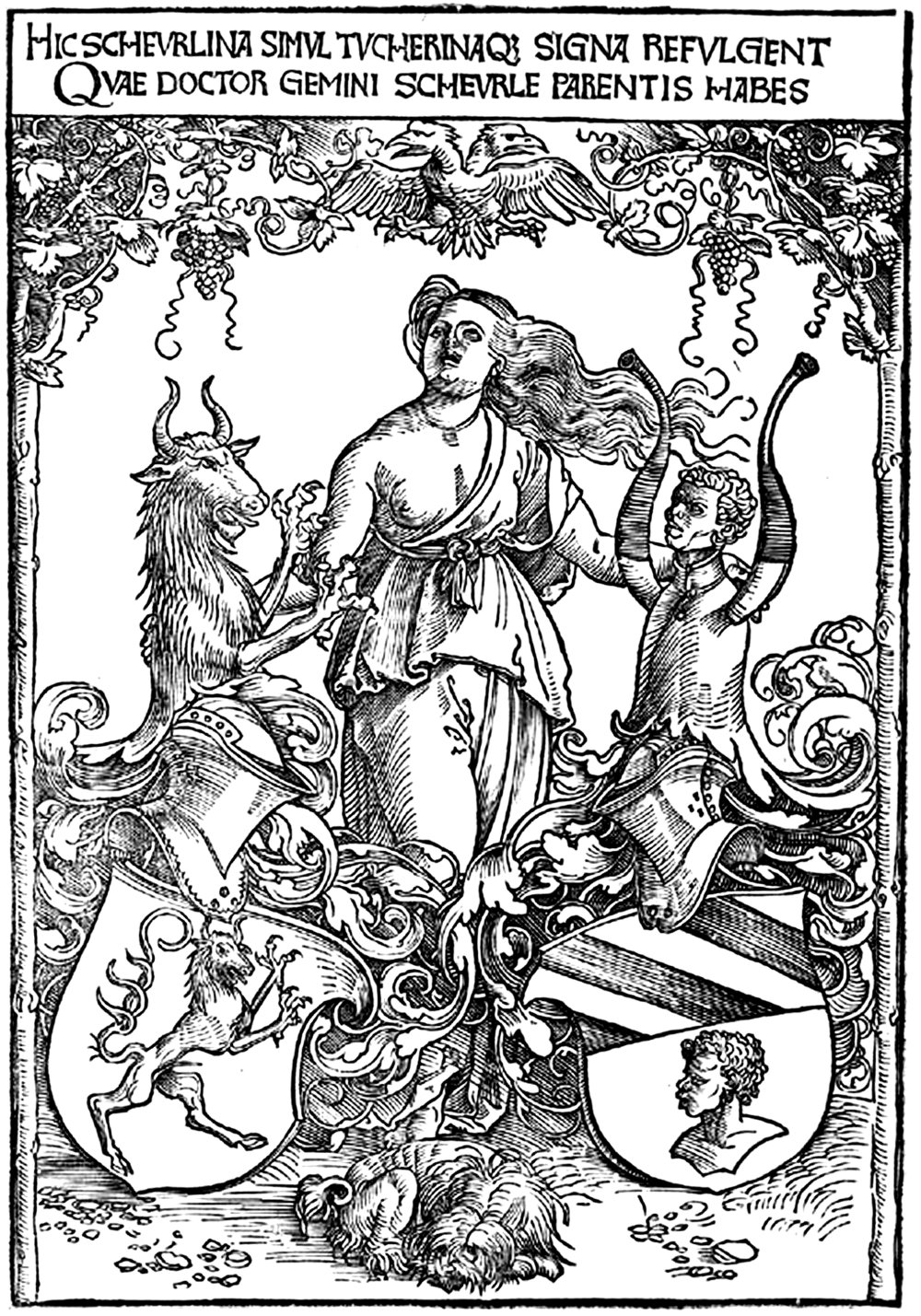
Albrecht Dürer: Crest of the Scheurl and Tucher von Simmelsdorf families, c. 1512

Christoph von Scheurl (11 November 1481 – 14 June 1542) was a German jurist, diplomat and humanist who became famous for arranging a humanistic friendship between Johann Eck and Martin Luther.

== Life ==
Scheurl was born in Nuremberg the eldest son of Christoph Scheurl from Wrocław in Silesia, and his wife, Helena Tucher. In 1496, he went to Heidelberg University to study Law, moving in 1498 to the University of Bologna in Italy to complete his studies. He graduated in 1506.

In 1507, with the support of Johann von Staupitz, he was elected Professor of Law at Wittenberg University, under the patronage of Frederick the Wise. He began lecturing in April 1507. In 1512 he returned to Nuremberg, his role primarily being that of a diplomat. In 1519, he travelled to Aragon to represent Nuremberg in the formal congratulations to the newly crowned Charles V, Holy Roman Emperor. In 1522, he was an ambassador in the negotiations with Archduke Ferdinand regarding the Turks in Vienna. In Nuremberg, he was also a friend of Albrecht Dürer. He was among the first people to have Luther's 95 theses printed and distributed. He died on 14 June 1542, aged 60.

== Family ==
In 1518, he married Katharina Futterer.

== Works (selected) ==
- De rebus gestis Alberti Ducis Saxioniae
- De Vita Ant. Cressenis
- Tractatus de sacerdorum & ecclesiasticarum rerum praestantia, Leipzig 1511
- Lib. De laudibus Germaniae & Ducum Saxoniae, Leipzig 1508
- Epist. Ad Charit. Pirckhameram, Nuernberg 1513
- Epist. Ad Charit. Pirckhameram, Nuernberg 1513
- Epist. Ad Staupitium de statu sive regimine reipubl. Noricae
- Epist. Ad Petr. Bernstein, 1580

== Sources ==
- Heinz Kathe: Die Wittenberger Philosophische Fakultät 1501–1817. Böhlau, Cologne 2002, ISBN 3-412-04402-4
- Walter Friedensburg: Geschichte der Universität Wittenberg. Max Niemeyer, Halle (Saale) 1917
- Irene Dingel und Günther Wartenberg: Die Theologische Fakultät Wittenberg 1502 bis 1602. Leipzig 2002, ISBN 3-374-02019-4
- Felix Streit: Christoph Scheurl, der Ratskonsulent von Nürnberg, und seine Stellung zur Reformation. Neupert Verlag, Plauen 1908
- "Entry". Zedlers Universallexikon. Vol. 34. p. 699.
