= Peter of Ravenna =

Italian jurist

Peter of Ravenna (c. 1448–1508) was an Italian jurist. He is now best known for his memorization techniques, published in a 1491 work Phoenix (Fenix) on the art of memory, a work that received an early form of copyright.

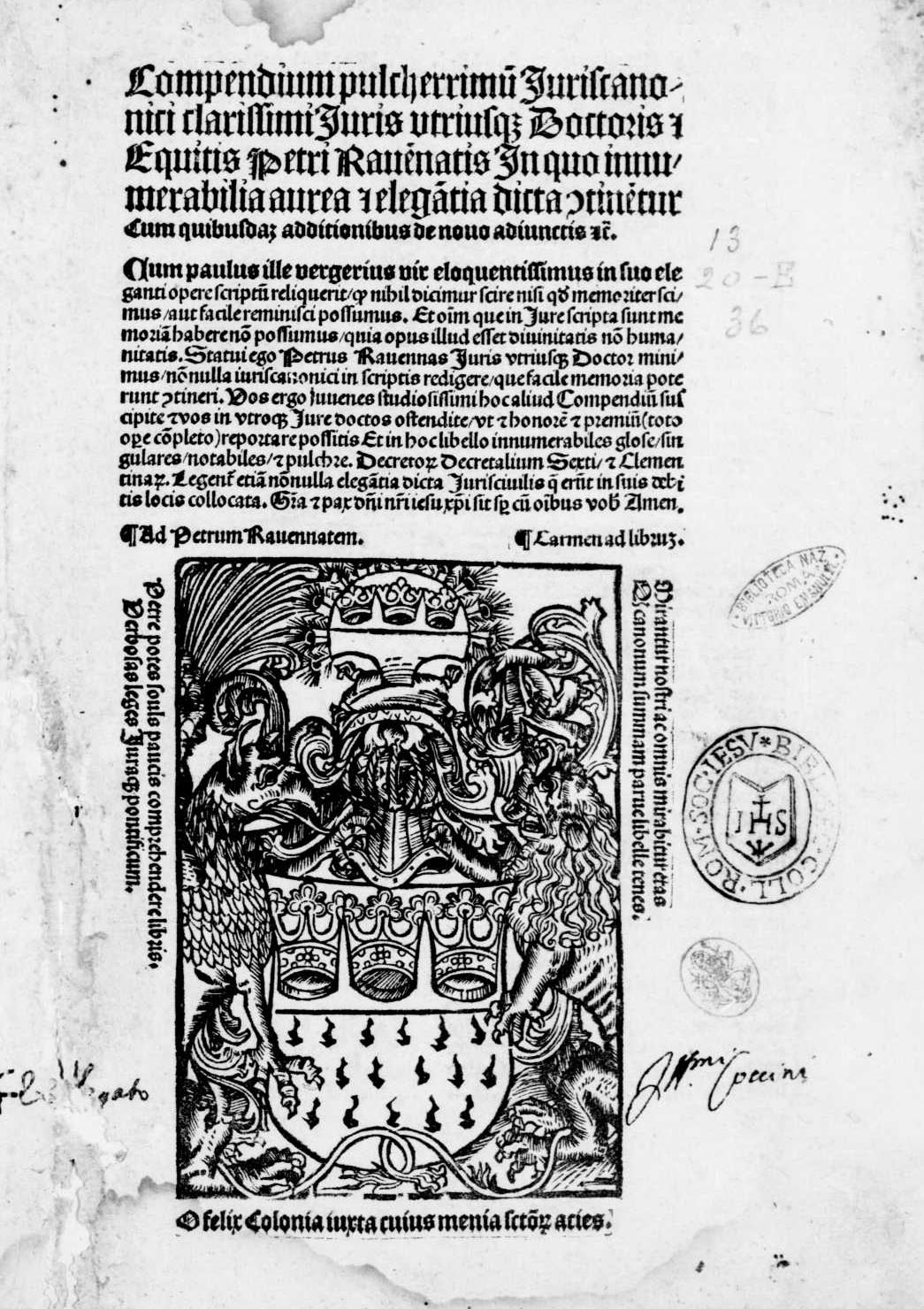
Compendium juris civilis & Canonici, 1507

== Life ==
He was a student of Alessandro Tartagni and then at Padua. He became Doctor of canon and civil law in 1472, and left Italy for Germany in 1497. He was then brought by Bogislaw X, Duke of Pomerania to the University of Greifswald.

He was appointed professor of canon and civil law at the University of Cologne in 1506. He was attacked by Jacob van Hoogstraaten in a legal controversy over the bodies of hanged criminals. The controversy, in 1507, was with the Cologne theological faculty, as a matter of demarcation. Peter repeated his views in a new edition of his canon law textbook. Hoogstraaten persisted when Peter moved in 1508 to Mainz. He died soon afterwards.

He also held a controversial opinion on divorce, believing that it was within the powers of the Pope.

== The Phoenix ==
It was published in Latin under the title Phoenix seu artificiosa memoria, in 1491 at Venice. It ran to many further editions and translations, as one of the most popular of the memory treatises. It remained influential for over two centuries. According to Frances Yates, it was quickly adopted by Gregor Reisch, and mentioned a little later by Johannes Romberch. It was also a major influence on Giordano Bruno.

The book offers a great deal of self-promotion by the author, who claims in it to have had a prodigious memory when young, able to memorise the whole civil law code at age ten. He had testimonials from Eleanor of Naples and Bonifacio del Monferrato. His actual system has been analysed as based on alphabetical keys, and what amounts to a topical concordance.

Robert Copland published a popular English translation, An Art of Memory That Otherwise Is Called the Phoenix, around 1548. This in turn influenced the Art of Rhetorique (1553) of Thomas Wilson.

The Phoenix was still in print in the seventeenth century in England, and was referred to by Robert Burton in his Anatomy of Melancholy.

== Works ==
- Phoenix seu artificiosa memoria. Venice. 1491.
- Compendium juris civilis & Canonici (in Latin). Köln: Hermann Bungart. 1507.
