= Karl Gottlieb Bretschneider =

German theologian (1776–1848)

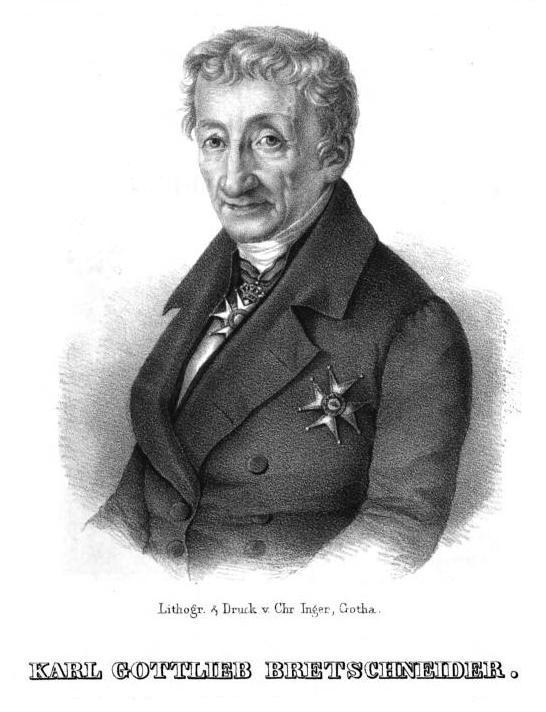
- Born: February 11, 1776
- Died: January 11, 1848 (aged 71)
- Education: University of Leipzig

Karl Gottlieb Bretschneider (February 11, 1776 in Gersdorf, Saxony – January 22, 1848 in Gotha, Thuringia) was a German Protestant scholar and theologian from Gersdorf, Saxony. He is noted for, among other things, having planned and founded the monumental Corpus Reformatorum. He is the father of Carl Anton Bretschneider, a mathematician.

== Education ==
In 1794, he entered the University of Leipzig, where he studied theology for four years. After some years of hesitation he resolved to be ordained, and in 1802 he passed with great distinction the examination for candidatus theologiae, and attracted the regard of Franz Volkmar Reinhard (1753–1812), author of the System der christlichen Moral (1788–1815), then court-preacher at Dresden, who became his warm friend and patron during the remainder of his life.

== Career ==
=== Teaching career ===
From 1804 to 1806, Bretschneider was Privatdozent at the University of Wittenberg, where he lectured on philosophy and theology. During this time he wrote his work on the development of dogma, Systematische Entwicklung aller in der Dogmatik vorkommenden Begriffe nach den symbolischen Schriften der evangelisch-lutherischen und reformirten Kirche (1805, 4th edition 1841), which was followed by others, including an edition of Sirach with a Latin commentary.

On the advance of the French army under Napoleon into Prussia, he determined to leave Wittenberg and abandon his university career. Through the good offices of Reinhard, he became pastor of Schneeberg in Saxony (1807). In 1808, he was promoted to the office of superintendent of the church of Annaberg, in which capacity he had to decide, in accordance with the Canon law of Saxony, many matters belonging to the department of ecclesiastical law. But the climate did not agree with him, and his official duties interfered with his theological studies. With a view to a change he took the degree of doctor of theology in Wittenberg in August 1812. In 1816, he was appointed general superintendent at Gotha, where he remained until his death. This was the great period of his literary activity.

=== Literary career ===
In 1820, he published his treatise on the Gospel of John, entitled Probabilia de evangelii et epistolarum Ioannis Apostoli indole et origine cruditorum, which attracted much attention. In this work, he collected with great fulness and discussed with marked moderation the arguments against Johannine authorship. This called forth a number of replies. To the astonishment of every one, Bretschneider announced in the preface to the second edition of his Dogmatik in 1822, that he had never doubted the authenticity of the gospel, and had published his Probabilia only to draw attention to the subject, and to call forth a more complete defence of its genuineness.

Bretschneider remarks in his autobiography that the publication of this work had the effect of preventing his appointment as successor to Karl Christian Tittmann (1744–1820) in Dresden, the minister Detlev von Einsiedel (1773–1861) denouncing him as the slanderer of John (Johannisschander). His greatest contribution to the science of exegesis was his Lexicon Manuale Graeco-Latinum in libros Novi Testamenti (1824, 3rd edition 1840). This work was valuable for the use which its author made of the Greek of the Septuagint, of the Old and New Testament Apocrypha, of Josephus, and of the apostolic fathers, in illustration of the language of the New Testament.

In 1826, he published Apologie der neuern Theologie des evangelischen Deutschlands. Hugh James Rose had published in England (1825) a volume of sermons on the rationalist movement (The State of the Protestant Religion in Germany), in which he classed Bretschneider with the rationalists; and Bretschneider contended that he himself was not a rationalist in the ordinary sense of the term, but a rational supernaturalist. Some of his numerous dogmatic writings passed through several editions. An English translation of his Manual of the Religion and History of the Christian Church appeared in 1857.

His dogmatic position seems to be intermediate between the extreme school of naturalists, such as Heinrich Paulus, Johann Friedrich Röhr (1777–1848) and Julius Wegscheider on the one hand, and DF Strauss and FC Baur on the other. Recognizing a supernatural element in the Bible, he nevertheless allowed to the full the critical exercise of reason in the interpretation of its dogmas (cp. Otto Pfleiderer, Development of Theology, pp. 89 ff.).
