= Corpus Reformatorum =

Collection of Protestant writings

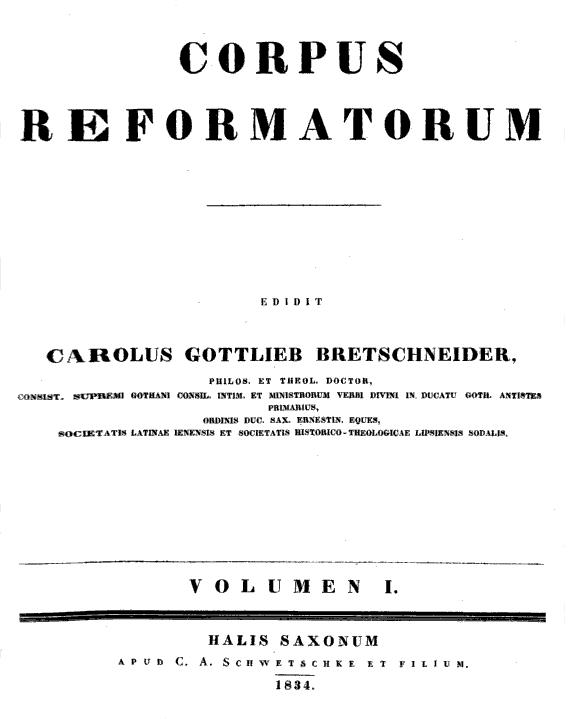
Corpus Reformatorum: title page to volume 1.

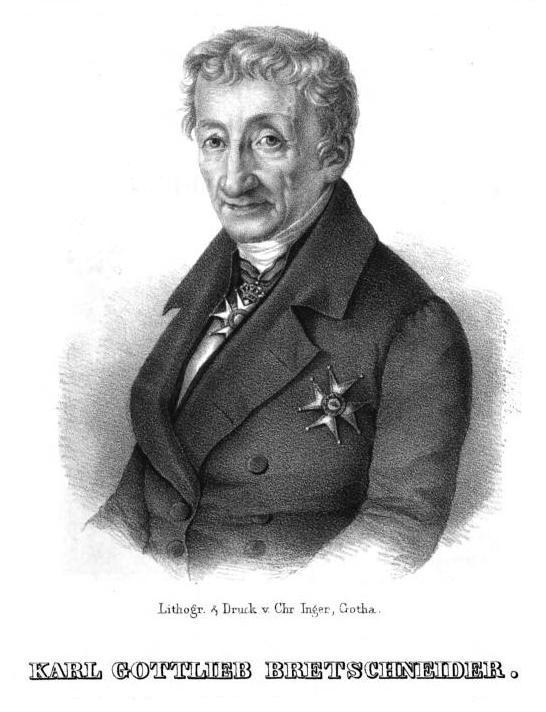
Founder and primary editor of the series Corpus Reformatorum, Karl Gottlieb Bretschneider.

The Corpus Reformatorum (Corp. Ref., Cor. Ref., C.R., CR) ( Halle (Saale), 1834 sqq.), is the general Latin title given to a large collection of Reformation writings. This collection, which runs to 101 volumes, contains reprints of the collected works of John Calvin, Philip Melanchthon, and Huldrych Zwingli, three of the leading Protestant reformers. Texts in the CR are written in either Latin, French or German (using Fraktur typefaces).

A collection of sixteenth century Catholic writings, intended as a counterpart to the Corpus Reformatorum, was begun by Professor Joseph Greving (1868–1919) of the University of Bonn in 1915. It was announced that same year in the Theologische Revue as a "Plan für ein Corpus Catholicorum" or "Plan for a Corpus Catholicorum"

== History ==
The Corpus Reformatorum was founded through the efforts of German scholar and theologian Karl Gottlieb Bretschneider, who began planning for it sometime after 1827. From 1834 until his death in 1848, Bretschneider also served as its primary editor.

== List of editors ==
- Karl Gottlieb Bretschneider (1776-1848)
- Heinrich Ernst Bindseil (1803-1876)
- Edward (Eduard) Reuss (Reuß) (1804–1891)
- August Edward (Eduard) Cunitz (Caunitz) (1812-1886)
- Johann Wilhelm (Guilielmus) (William) Baum (1806-1878)
- Emil Egli (1848-1908)
- Georg Finsler (1819-1899)
- Walther Köhler (1870-1946)

== The Corpus Reformatorum online ==
These works are being digitized by Google Books. Not all volumes are currently available. Many volumes which have been digitized are no longer available online.

=== Series I: Philip Melanchthon, Opera Quae Supersunt Omnia - Volumes 1- 28 ===
Volumes 1-15 edited by Karl Gottlieb Bretschneider. Volumes 16-28 edited by Heinrich Ernst Bindseil.

- CR 1 - 1834
- CR 2 - 1835
- CR 3 - 1836
- CR 4 - 1837
- CR 5 - 1838
- CR 6 - 1839
- CR 7 - 1840
- CR 8 - 1841
- CR 9 - 1842
- CR 10 - 1842
- CR 11 - 1843
- CR 12 - 1844
- CR 13 - 1846
- CR 14 - 1847
- CR 15 - 1848
- CR 16 - 1850
- CR 17 - 1851
- CR 18 - 1852
- CR 19 - 1853
- CR 20 - 1854
- CR 21 - 1854
- CR 22 - 1855
- CR 23 - 1855
- CR 24 - 1856
- CR 25 - 1856
- CR 26 - 1858
- CR 27 - 1859
- CR 28 - 1860

=== Series II: Ioannis Calvini, Opera Quae Supersunt Omnia – Volumes 29- 87 ===
Edited by Guilielmus Baum, Eduardus Cunitz, Eduardus Reuss.

- Opp. = Opera Quae Supersunt Omnia.
- CR 29 (Institutio Christianae Religionis - 1536 / 1559 ed.); Opp. 1,
- CR 30 (Institutio Christianae Religionis - 1559 ed.); Opp. 2 - 1864
- CR 31; Opp. 3 - 1865
- CR 32; Opp.
- CR 33; Opp. 5 - 1867
- CR 34; Opp. 6 - 1867
- CR 35; Opp. 7 - 1868
- CR 37; Opp. 9 - 1870
- CR 38; Opp. 10 (Pars Prior. & Pars Posterior.) - 1871 & 1872
- CR 39; Opp.
- CR 40; Opp.12 - 1874
- CR 41; Opp. 13 - 1875
- CR 42; Opp.
- CR 43; Opp.
- CR 44; Opp. 16 - 1877
- CR 45; Opp.
- CR 46; Opp.
- CR 47; Opp.
- CR 48; Opp.
- CR 49; Opp. 21 - 1879
- CR 50; Opp. 22 - 1880
- CR 51; Opp.
- CR 52; Opp.
- CR 53; Opp.
- CR 54; Opp.
- CR 55; Opp.
- CR 56; Opp.
- CR 57; Opp.
- CR 58; Opp.
- CR 59; Opp.31 –1887
- CR 60; Opp.32 – 1887
- CR 61; Opp.33 – 1887
- CR 62; Opp.34 –1887
- CR 63; Opp.35 – 1887
- CR 64; Opp.36 –1888
- CR 65; Opp.37 – 1888
- CR 66; Opp.38 – 1888
- CR 67; Opp.
- CR 68; Opp.
- CR 69; Opp.
- CR 70; Opp.
- CR 71; Opp.43 – 1890
- CR 72; Opp.44 -1890
- CR 73 (Commentarius in Harmoniam Evangelicam); Opp.45 – 1891
- CR 74 (Commentarius in Harmoniam Evangelicam); Opp.46 –1891
- CR 75 (Commentarius in Evangelium Ioannis); Opp. 47 - 1892
- CR 76; Opp.
- CR 77; Opp.
- CR 78; Opp.
- CR 79; Opp.51 – 1895
- CR 80; Opp.52 – 1895
- CR 81; Opp.53 – 1895
- CR 82; Opp.54 – 1895
- CR 83; Opp.55 – 1896
- CR 84; Opp. 56 - 1896
- CR 85; Opp.57 –1897
- CR 86-87; Opp.58-19 – 1900

=== Series III: Huldreich Zwinglis, Sämtliche Werke - Volumes 88-101 ===
- CR 88; Werke 1 – 1904
- CR 89; Werke 2 – 1907
- CR 94; Werke 7 – 1911
