= Jacob van Hoogstraaten =

Brabantian Flemish Catholic theologian and inquisitor (c. 1460–1527)

Jacob van Hoogstraten (c. 1460 – 24 January 1527) was a Brabantian Flemish Dominican theologian and controversialist.

== Education, professor ==
Van Hoogstraten was born in Hoogstraten, Burgundian Netherlands (now Belgium). He studied the classics and theology with the Dominicans at Old University of Leuven. In 1485, he was among the first in the history of that institution to receive the degree of Master of Arts. He there entered the order, and after his ordination to the priesthood in 1496, he matriculated in the University of Cologne to continue his theological studies.

At the general chapter held in 1498 at Ferrara he was appointed professor of theology at the Dominican college of Cologne. In 1500, he was elected prior of St Paul’s Priory in Antwerp. On the expiration of his term of office, he returned to Cologne, where, in February, 1504, he received the degree of Doctor of Theology. At the general chapter of the Dominican Order held in Pavia in 1507 he was made regent of studies, and thereby became professor of theology at the university.

== Inquisitor ==
Van Hoogstraten began his controversial career by publishing in 1507 Defensorium fratrum mendicantium contra curatos illos qui privilegia fratrum injuste impugnat (Cologne) in defence of the mendicant orders, who had been accused of abusing their privileges. In the same year he published several works against the eminent Italian jurist, Pietro Tomasi of Ravenna, who was then lecturing in the German universities. During his controversy with the Italian jurist, he was elected prior of the convent of Cologne, and thus became inquisitor general of the archbishoprics of Cologne, Mainz, and Trier. He wrote several treatises, particularly against the use of witchcraft and in 1512 he took place in the trial of Herman van Rijswijk, and condemned him as a relapsed heretic.

=== Opposition to Judaism and Lutheranism ===
He played his principal role in the controversy on the confiscation of Hebrew books, in which with Johann Reuchlin defended preserving those books against the calls of Johannes Pfefferkorn (a Jewish convert to Catholicism) to destroy them, in particular the Talmud. While van Hoogstraten took no active part in the earlier stages of the controversy, his sympathies were with Reuchlin's opponents as evidenced by his close relationship with Pfefferkorn. Influenced no doubt, to some extent by the unfavourable attitude of the universities towards the Jewish books, van Hoogstraten on 15 September 1513, in his capacity as inquisitor, summoned Reuchlin to appear within six days before the ecclesiastical court of Mainz to answer to the charges of favouring the Jews and their anti-Christian literature. The latter appealed to Rome. Pope Leo X authorized the Bishop of Speyer to decide the matter. Meanwhile, van Hoogstraten had Reuchlin's Augenspiegel, a previously published retort to Pfefferkorn's Handspiegel, publicly burned at Cologne.

On 29 March 1514, the Bishop of Speyer announced that the Augenspiegel contained nothing injurious to the Catholic Faith, pronounced judgment in favour of Reuchlin, and sentenced van Hoogstraten to pay the expenses consequent upon the process. The latter appealed to Rome, but the pope postponed the trial indefinitely. The Dominicans deprived van Hoogstraten of the office of prior and inquisitor, but in January 1520, the pope annulled the decision of the Bishop of Speyer, condemned the Augenspiegel, and reinstated van Hoogstraten.

Van Hoogstraten then turned his attention to Martin Luther and campaigned against his reforming work. He was the initial inquisitor, who, in 1523, sentenced to death Jan van Essen and Hendrik Vos, the first Lutherans to die as martyrs for their beliefs.

Jacob Van Hoogstraten died in Cologne on 24 January 1527.

== See also ==
- Hochstratus Ovans

== Bibliography ==
Among the other works of van Hoogstraten besides those already mentioned, the following are the more important:

- Defensio scholastica principum Alemanniæ in eo, quod sceleratos detinent insepultos in ligno contra P. Ravennatem (Cologne, 1508);
- Justificatorium principum Alemanniæ, dissolvens rationes Petri Ravennatis, quibus Principum judicia carpsit (Cologne, 1508);
- Tractatus de cadaveribus maleficorum morte punitorum (Cologne, 1508);
- Tractatus magistralis, declarans quam graviter peccent quærentes auxilium a maleficis (Cologne, 1510);
- Apologia Fr. Jacobi Hoogstraeten (Cologne, 1518);
- Apologia altera (Cologne, 1519);
- Destructio cabbalæ (Cologne, 1519);
- Margarita moralis philosophiæ in duodecim redacta libros (Cologne, 1521).
