= Colloquy of Worms (1540–1541) =

The Colloquy of Worms or Conference of Worms (1540–1541) was a meeting held in Worms, Germany with the objective of settling differences between Protestant Reformers and Catholics in Germany. It followed the unsuccessful Colloquy of Hagenau in 1540. Johann Eck represented the Catholics and Philip Melanchthon represented the Protestants. The Colloquy reached an agreement on the doctrine of original sin, but it decided to end discussions due to the calling of the Conference of Ratisbon.
