= Caspar Schatzgeyer =

German Franciscan

Caspar Schatzgeyer (c. 1464 – 1527) was a German Franciscan and a foremost opponent of the Protestant reformer Martin Luther in Germany.

== Biography ==
He was born at Landshut in Bavaria in 1463 or 1464. For many years he was guardian at Munich, and since 1517 first provincial superior of the Strasbourg religious province of the Friars Minor, and definitor-general.

In 1523 he was appointed inquisitor for Germany (the Holy Roman Empire). Schatzgeyer energetically opposed the new doctrine as heretical errors, both in word and writing. It is in great part due to him and his confreres that the Catholic Faith held its ground in southern Germany, and that the Bavarian Government strenuously defended its cause. Within a few years he published upwards of twenty-three works in which he defended the Catholic position on such doctrines as grace, the veneration of saints, monasticism, the indissolubility of marriage, the Mass, purgatory etc.

He died at Munich in 1527.

His writings have received the highest praise from John Eck, who collected and published them at Ingolstadt in 1543.
