= Girolamo Aleandro =

16th-century Venetian and Catholic cardinal

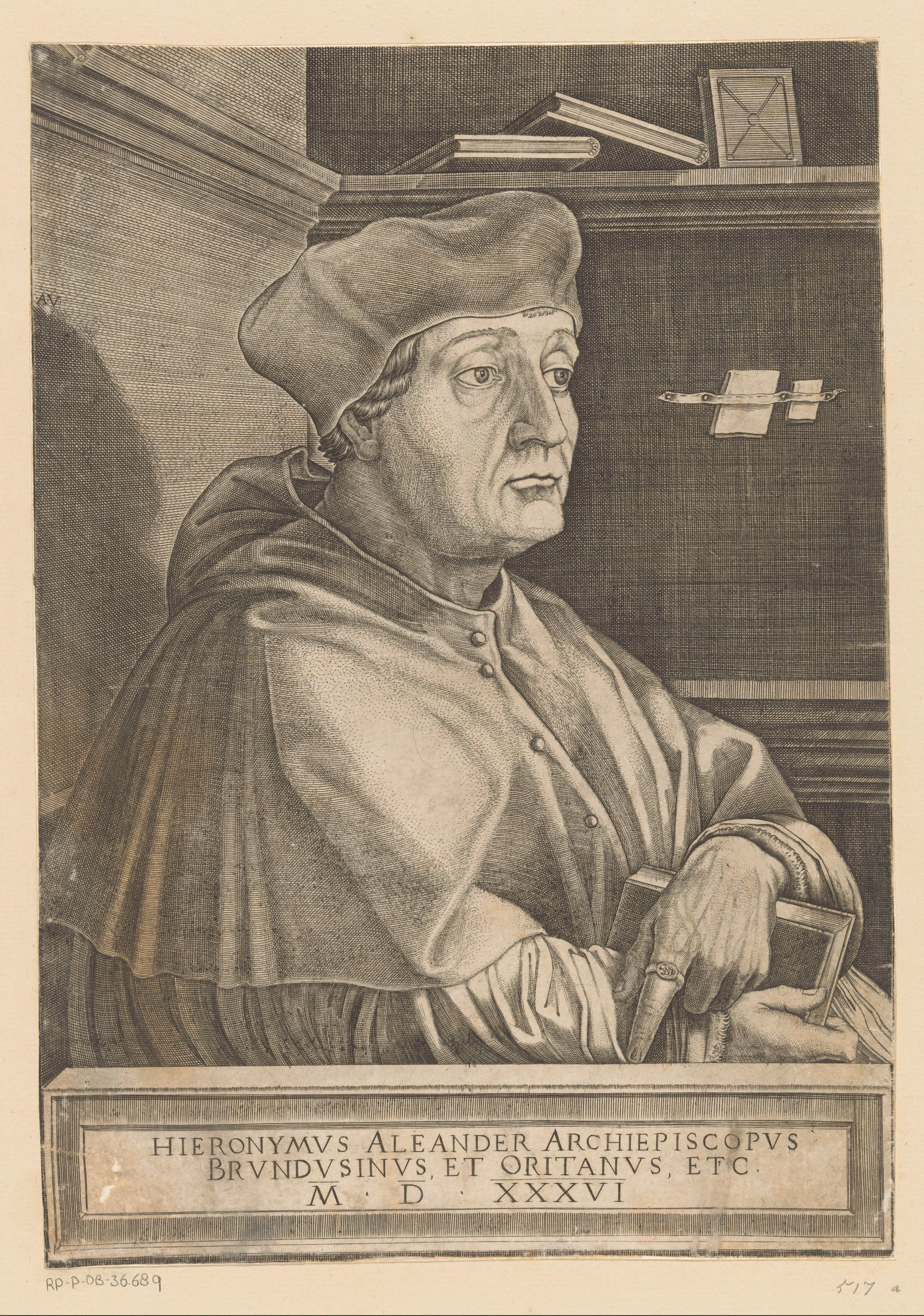

Hieronymus Aleander (born Girolamo Aleandro; 13 February 1480 – 1 February 1542) was a Venetian humanist, linguist, and cardinal.

== Life ==
Aleander was born on 13 February 1480 in Motta di Livenza, in the province of Treviso, part of the Republic of Venice. The son of a doctor, he studied medicine, philology, and theology in Padua. In Venice, he became acquainted with Erasmus and Aldus Manutius, and at an early age was reputed one of the most learned men of the time, with a knowledge of Greek, Latin, Hebrew, and Chaldaean. In 1508, he went to Paris on the invitation of Louis XII as professor of belles lettres, and from 1513 to 1516 held the position of Rector of the University of Paris at the Sorbonne. Entering the service of Érard de La Marck, prince-bishop of Liège, he was sent by that prelate on a mission to Rome, where Pope Leo X retained him, giving him (1519) the office of librarian of the Vatican.

In the following year, he went to Germany to be present as papal nuncio at the coronation of Emperor Charles V, and was also present at the Diet of Worms, where he headed the opposition to Martin Luther, advocating the most extreme measures to repress the doctrines of the reformer. His conduct evoked the fiercest denunciations of Luther, but it also displeased more moderate men, especially Erasmus. The edict against the reformer, which was finally adopted by the emperor and the diet, was drawn up and proposed by Aleander. After the close of the Diet, the papal nuncio went to the Netherlands, where he instigated the executions of two monks of Antwerp due to their embrace of the Reformation, resulting in their being burnt in Brussels.

In August 1524, Pope Clement VII appointed Aleander the Archbishop of Brindisi, for which office he was ordained to the priesthood two months later. The pope then sent him as nuncio to the court of King Francis I of France. He was taken prisoner along with that monarch at the Battle of Pavia in 1525, and was released only on payment of a heavy ransom. He was subsequently employed on various papal missions, especially to Germany, but was unsuccessful in preventing the German princes from making a truce with the reformers, or in checking to any extent the progress of the reformers' doctrines.

Aleander was eventually consecrated a bishop on 28 February 1528 to fulfill the duties of his office. He was created a cardinal in pectore on 22 December 1536 by Pope Paul III (at the same time as Reginald Pole), which was published (i.e., publicly announced) only on 13 March 1538, at which time he was able to assume that office. He was given the rank of Cardinal Priest, with his titular church in Rome as San Ciriaco alle Terme Diocleziane, which was changed a week later to the Church of San Crisogono.

Aleander resigned as Archbishop of Brindisi on 30 January 1541. He died at Rome on 1 February 1542. His remains were initially buried in his titular church, but later were transferred to his hometown and re-buried there in the Church of San Niccolò.

== Writings ==
Aleander compiled a Lexicon Graeco-Latinum (1512) and an introductory Greek grammar, the Elementale introductorium in nominum et verborum declinationes Graecas (1509), and edited Greek texts by Isocrates, Plutarch, and Lucian (1509–1510). Some of his Latin verses were included in the Carmina Illustrium Poetarum Italiorum of Joannes Matthaeus Toscanus. The Vatican Library contains manuscript letters and other documents written by him in connection with his various missions against Luther, which are important sources for the Reformation and Counter-Reformation; they were used by (among others) the church historian Francesco Sforza Pallavicino in his history of the council of Trent.

== See also ==
- Hochstratus Ovans
