= 1460s =

Decade

The 1460s decade ran from January 1, 1460, to December 31, 1469.

== Events ==
=== January–March ===
- January 14 – After gaining a consensus at the Council of Mantua, Pope Pius II formally declares a Christian crusade against the Muslim Ottoman Empire to recapture Constantinople, which had been captured by the Ottomans in 1453.
- January 15 – At the Battle of Sandwich in England, Yorkists raid Sandwich, Kent, and capture the royal fleet.
- February 29 – Johann IV and his brother Sigismund of the House of Wittelsbach become the joint rulers of "Bavaria-Munich", one of several smaller states that had been fragmented from the original Duchy of Bavaria, upon the death of their father, Albrecht III the Pious. Johann's third son, Albrecht IV, will reunite Bavaria-Munich with the other states (Bavaria-Landshut, Bavaria-Ingolstadt and Bavaria-Straubing) into a single Duchy of Bavaria in 1503.
- March 4 – At Rome on the Wednesday during Ember Days, Pope Pius II addresses an assembly of the College of Cardinals and criticizes most of them, declaring that "Your lifestyle is such that you would appear to have been chosen, not to govern the state, but called to enjoy pleasures. You avoid neither hunting, nor games, nor the company of women. You put together parties that are more opulent than is fitting. You wear clothes that are far too expensive. You overflow with gold and silver." He then directs them to consider the qualities of new candidates for the College. The next day, six cardinals are elected, including Francesco Nanni-Todeschini-Piccolomini, the Pope's nephew, who will later become Pope Pius III.
- March 5 – King Christian I of Denmark, the various nobles of the Duchy of Schleswig and the County of Holstein agree to the Treaty of Ribe, electing King Christian as the new Duke of Schleswig and Count of Holstein, and placing both political entities under Denmark's control.
- March 21 – After having control of Malbork Castle, the Polish Army begins a siege against the Prussian town of Marienburg.

=== April–June ===
- April 4 – The University of Basel is founded in Switzerland.
- May 30 – Demetrios Palaiologos, the ruler of the Byzantine despotate of Morea in southern Greece surrenders the capital, Mystras,to the Ottomans. The Ottoman sultan Mehmed II grants some islands in the Aegean Sea to Palaiologos, and he lives for several years in relative comfort.
- June 3 – Pope Pius II re-imposes a 1454 ban against trade with the Prussian Confederation, and extends it to include a ban against trading with the Kingdom of Poland, after the Prussian states and Poland refuse to join in the proposed crusade against the Ottoman Empire.
- June 26 – Wars of the Roses: Richard Neville, 16th Earl of Warwick and Edward, Earl of March (eldest son of Richard Plantagenet, Duke of York) land in England at Sandwich, Kent with an army, and march on London.

=== July–September ===
- July 2 – The city of London opens its gates to the Yorkist invaders and puts up no resistance to their occupation.
- July 4 – The cannons of the Tower of London, still in Lancastrian hands, are fired on the city of London, which is mostly in Yorkist. The Tower is surrendered on July 19.
- July 5 – The town of Marienburg is captured by the Polish army after a four-month siege that had been started by General Proandota Lubieszowski, who had died during the fighting.
- July 10 – Wars of the Roses – King Henry VI of England is captured as prisoner of war after his army is defeated at the Battle of Northampton by the earls of Warwick and March. It is agreed that York will be Henry's heir, disinheriting the King's son Edward of Westminster, Prince of Wales.
- July 30 – King Henry VI summons the English Parliament to assemble at Westminster on October 7.
- August 3 – King James II of Scotland is killed by the explosion of a cannon which he had purchased from Flanders as part of acquiring the most up-to-date military technology for Scotland. The King had been supervising the bombardment of Roxburgh Castle during a siege to force out the English occupation troops. Historian Robert Lindsay of Pitscottie later writes "as the King stood near a piece of artillery, his thigh bone was dug in two with a piece of misframed gun that brake in shooting, by which he was stricken to the ground and died hastily. He is succeeded by his 8-year-old son, who becomes King James III, with power exercised by the boy's mother, the Queen Regent Mary of Guelders.
- August 8 – Sigismund, the Duke of Austria, is excommunicated from the Roman Catholic Church by Pope Pius II and has his domains placed under an interdict.
- September 14 – The siege of Trebizond, the capital of the Empire of Trebizond, is started by the Ottoman Empire. The Trebizond Emperor, David Megas Komnenos withstands the siege for almost a year.

=== October–December ===
- October 7 – The 22nd parliament of Henry VI is opened, and the House of Commons elects John Green as its speaker.
- October 10 – Richard, Duke of York enters the Council Chamber, places his hand upon the throne, and announces that he is the rightful King of England. He then takes up residence at the royal palace.
- October 25 – The Act of Accord, passed by the Parliament of England, is given royal assent by King Henry VI as a compromise to end the War of the Roses between King Henry's supporters (the Lancastrians) and the supporters of Richard of York (the Yorkists). Under the law, King Henry is permitted to rule England for the rest of his life, but his son, Edward of Westminster, Prince of Wales is removed from the right of succession and Richard of York and his descendants are granted the right to rule upon King Henry's death.
- November 7 – King James II of Cyprus orders his chief minister, George Boustronios, to travel to Larnaca, and to round up "both the serfs and emancipated peasants, both mounted and on foot", to be delivered to the King at Nicosia to be drafted into the King's army, with the promise of benefits to the peasants and emancipation to the serfs.
- December 2 – In Spain, the popular Prince Carlos de Viana, heir to the throne of Navarre, is arrested at Lleida and jailed in Morella by order of his father, King Juan II, leading to an uprising in Catalonia. King Juan eventually yields and frees Prince Carlos two months later on February 25.
- December 30 – Wars of the Roses – Richard of York, set to be the next King of England, is killed along with his son, Edmund, Earl of Rutland, at the Battle of Wakefield as a Lancastrian army under Henry Beaufort, Duke of Somerset and Henry Percy, Earl of Northumberland decisively defeats the Yorkists. York's son Edward becomes leader of the Yorkist faction and the heir to the English throne.

=== Date unknown ===
- Ali Bey Mihaloğlu captures Michael Szilágyi.
- Portuguese navigator Pedro de Sintra reaches the coast of modern-day Sierra Leone.
- A famine breaks out in the Deccan Plateau of India.
- A monk, Leonardo da Pistoia, arrives in Florence from Macedonia, with the Corpus Hermeticum.

=== January–March ===
- January 12 – John Neville, a Yorkist who betrayed Richard of York at the Battle of Wakefield and joined the Lancastrians during the Wars of the Roses, leads troops on raids in northern England, pillaging Beverley
- January 22 – In Japan, where the Kansho famine has led to thousands of people starving to death, the shogun Ashikaga Yoshimasa orders relief efforts to be coordinated by Ganami, a Buddhist monk who leads the Kōfuku-ji temple.
- February 2 – After the "sun dog" (parhelion) weather phenomenon in England gives the illusion of three suns rising at dawn, Edward, Earl of March, leads the Yorkists to victory over the Lancastrians in battle at the Battle of Mortimer's Cross. Edward convinces his frightened troops that the three sunrises represents the Holy Trinity and divine support for the Yorkist cause. The Lancastrians, led by Owen Tudor and his son Jasper Tudor, Earl of Pembroke, are defeated and Owen Tudor is taken prisoner and executed.
- February 17 – Second Battle of St Albans, England: The Earl of Warwick's army is defeated by a Lancastrian force under Queen Margaret, who recovers control for her husband.
- March 4 – Edward, Duke of York, son of the late Richard of York and heir to the English throne, seizes London, and proclaims himself King Edward IV.
- March 5 – Wars of the Roses: King Henry VI of England is deposed by Edward, Duke of York.
- March 29 – At the Battle of Towton in Yorkshire, the newly proclaimed Yorkist King Edward IV defeats the Lancastrians, led by the Duke of Somerset, to make good his claim to the English throne. The battle, which claims the lives of at least 6,000 supporters of King Henry VI and at least 3,000 of King Edward's men, remains one of the bloodiest battles ever fought on English soil.

=== April–June ===
- April 17 – Skanderbeg, ruler of Albania, reaches a three-year peace agreement with the Ottoman Empire.
- May 3 – Theodosius Byvaltsev is installed as the new leader of the Russian Orthodox Church as Metropolitan of Moscow and all the Russias by order of Vasily II Vasilyevich, Grand Prince of Moscow.
- May 15 – In Ireland, Fedlim Geancach Ó Conchobair becomes the last King of Connacht, now the Republic of Ireland's Province of Connaught and comprising what are now the Counties Galway, Leitrim, Mayo, Roscommon, and Sligo. Upon Fedlim's death in 1475,
- May 23 – King Edward IV summons the English Parliament for the first time, directing the members of the House of Lords and House of Commons to assemble at Westminster on November 4.
- May 28 – In Italy, King Ferdinand of Naples is forced to abandon the city of Venosa, the Albanian general Skanderbeg leads his cavalry in an attack on Venosa after an attack by the former king, Rene of Anjou and by General Jacopo Piccinino. Fleeing to Apulia, Ferdinand learns that the Albanian General Skanderbeg will soon arrive to fight the House of Anjou.
- June 28 – Edward, Richard of York's son, is crowned as Edward IV, King of England. He reigns until 1483.

=== July–September ===
- July 10 – Stephen Tomašević becomes the last King of Bosnia, on the death of his father Stephen Thomas.
- July 18 – In the Republic of Genoa in Italy, Spinetta Fregoso is elected by the republic's council as the new chief executive, the Doge. He remains in office for only six days before being forced to surrender to Lodovico di Campofregoso.
- July 22 – Louis XI succeeds Charles VII of France as king (reigns until 1483).
- July – The last remnant of the Byzantine Empire is lost to the Ottomans as General Graitzas Palaiologos honourably surrenders Salmeniko Castle, the last garrison of the Despotate of the Morea, to invading forces after a year-long siege.
- August 7 – The Ming Dynasty Chinese military general Cao Qin stages a coup against the Tianshun Emperor; after setting fire to the eastern and western gates of the Imperial City, Beijing (which are doused by pouring rains during the day-long uprising), Cao Qin finds himself hemmed in on all sides by imperial forces, loses three of his own brothers in the fight, and instead of facing execution, he flees to his home in the city, and commits suicide by jumping down a well located within his walled compound.
- August 15 –
  - The Empire of Trebizond, the last major Romano-Greek outpost, falls to the Ottoman Empire under Mehmed II, after a 21-day siege.
  - The coronation of Louis XI as King of France takes place at Reims.
- August 24 – The Angevins, led by Giovanni Antonio Orsini del Balzo, lift their siege of Barletta in the Kingdom of Naples when Ivan Strez Balšić arrives with cavalry and infantry to rescue King Ferrante. Orsini's erroneous belief that Skanderbeg has accompanied the Neapolitan Army is enough to cause him to order a withdrawal.
- September 4 – At Bidar, in what is now the Karnataka state of India, Nizam-Ud-Din Ahmad III becomes the new Sultan of Bahmani three days after the death of his father, Humayun Shah.
- September 30 – Pembroke Castle in Wales is surrendered to William Herbert, who has been sent by England's King Edward IV to remove Jasper Tudor, uncle of the recently deposed King Henry VII. At the same time, Lord Herbert becomes the guardian of the four-year old Prince Henry Tudor, who will later become King Henry VII of England.

=== October–December ===
- October 19 – With the Yorkist victory in the War of the Roses, the proposal by the new English King, Edward IV for an alliance with Scottish nobles against the former King Henry VI is approved by Scottish Highland lords at Ardtornish Castle. The agreement will become the basis for the Treaty of Westminster four months later on February 13, 1462.
- November 4 – The English Parliament is opened at Westminster by King Edward IV, and the House of Commons elects James Strangeways as its Speaker.
- November 17 – The coronation of Stephen Tomašević as the King of Bosnia takes place at Saint Mary's Church at Jajce.
- November 27 – An earthquake estimated later at 6.4 magnitude occurs at L'Aquila in the Abruzzo region of the Kingdom of Naples and kills more than 80 people.
- December 21 – The first English Parliament under King Edward IV adjourns and the King gives royal assent to the Act titled "In eschewing of Ambiguities, Doubts, and Diversities of Opinions which may rise, ensue, or be taken of and upon judicial Acts and Eximplifications of same, made or had in the Time or Times of Henry the Fourth, Henry the Fifth His Son, and Henry the Sixth His Son or any of them, late Kings of England successively, in Deed and not of Right", designating which acts of this three immediate predecessors are repealed and which are renewed.
- December 28 – General Skanderbeg of Albania recaptures the fortress of Trani for the Kingdom of Naples after finding the rebel leader Fuscia de Foxa and 16 other rebels outside the walls of the city.

=== Date unknown ===
- Cirencester Grammar School is founded in southwest England by the Bishop of Durham.
- Leonardo da Vinci and Sandro Botticelli become students of Verrocchio.
- Sarajevo, capital of Bosnia and Herzegovina, is founded by the Ottomans.
- François Villon writes Le Grand Testament.

=== January–March ===
- January 16 – The conflict in Poland over who should be the bishop of Krakow — Pope Pius II's appointee Jakub of Sienno or King Casimir IV's pick, Jan Gruszczynski — Pope Pius sends his legate, the Archbishop of Crete Hieronymus Landus, to negotiate a compromise that ultimately ends with Jakub being recognized by King Casimir as Bishop.<
- January 22 – On Saint Vincent's Day, Portuguese explorer Diogo Afonso and his men become the first Europeans to discover the island of São Vicente (now part of Cape Verde) off the coast of North Africa.
- February 13 – The Treaty of Westminster is agreed upon between King Edward IV of England and the Scotland noble John of Islay, Earl of Ross and Lord of the Isles. The parties sign the treaty on March 17.
- March 27 – Ivan III of Russia becomes the ruler of Russia, following the death of his father, Vasili.

=== April–June ===
- April 1 – Bishop Antony Kokkas becomes the new Ecumenical Patriarch of Constantinople, succeeding the late Patriarch Isidore II as leader of the Eastern Orthodox Christians in the Ottoman Empire. He takes the name Ioasaf I.
- April 3 – Matthias Corvinus, King of Hungary, and Frederick III, Holy Roman Emperor, come to an agreement to return the Crown of St. Stephen to Hungary in return for payment of 80,000 florins, and recognizing Matthias as King.
- April 28 – Pope Pius II issues the papal bull Cum almam nostram urbem prohibiting the destruction or removal of the ancient ruins in Rome and Campagna or the burning of ancient marble for lime, with violators subject to excommunication.
- May 23 – Catalan Civil War: In the Principality of Catalonia in Spain, the Siege of Hostalric, controlled by forces loyal to John II of Aragon, is started by Catalan General Pere de Bell-lloc and the Hostalric castle surrenders six days later.
- June 17 – In the "Night Attack at Târgoviște", Vlad the Impaler ("Dracula") attempts to assassinate Mehmed II, forcing him to retreat from Wallachia.
- June 30 – At the Battle of Seckenheim, Frederick I, as Elector of Palatine, is victorious over four other opponents.

=== July–September ===
- July 7 – In his campaign against the Ottomans in western Macedonia, at the Second Battle of Mokra, Skanderbeg surprises Ottoman troops near Mokra, orders his men to scare the enemy with drums and battlehorns, and then leads a successful attack, killing many of the Ottoman soldiers.
- July 22 – The first siege of Chilia by Stephen the Great fails, and he is seriously wounded.
- August 20 – On the Saint Bernard's Day, the Spanish army of the Kingdom of Castile, led by Enrique Pérez de Guzmán y Fonseca, captures Gibraltar, which has been under the rule of the Sultanate of Morocco for almost 130 years since its capture in 1333 AD. King Enrique IV declares himself "King of Gibraltar" in addition to his other titles.
- September 15 – The Ottoman Sultan Mehmed II conquers the Greek island of Lesbos after a 14-day attack by sea and by land with over 20,000 troops, capturing the last fortress in the siege of Mytilene.
- September 17 – Thirteen Years' War – Battle of Świecino (Battle of Żarnowiec): The Kingdom of Poland defeats the Teutonic Order.

=== October–December ===
- October 7 – Pope Pius II issues the declaration Apud Raynaldum, condemning the enslavement of Christians, although the prohibition is limited only to people recently baptized.
- October 28 – Adolph II of Nassau captures the town of Mainz and ends the Mainz Diocesan Feud, then carries a massacre of more than 400 citizens.
- November 2 – King Edward IV issues a charter guaranteeing the right of clergy to be tried in the ecclesiastical courts rather than by the royal judicial system set for most of the English inhabitants, despite the general limitation of ecclesiastical courts to church matters.
- December 22 – King Edward IV summons the members of the House of Lords and the House of Commons to assemble at the English Parliament for April 29, 1463.
- December – After Radu III the Fair takes over the throne in Wallachia, Vlad III Dracula seeks help in Transylvania, where he is captured by Mathias Corvinus, and imprisoned for the next 12 years, over false charges of treason.

=== Date unknown ===
- The Jews are expelled from Mainz, Germany.
- Portugal begins to settle the Cape Verde Islands, with slaves from the coast of Guinea.

=== January–March ===
- January 5 – French poet François Villon receives a reprieve from death by hanging, and is banished from Paris (his further life is undocumented).
- February 6 – Otto II, Duke of Brunswick-Göttingen, a semi-independent principality within the Holy Roman Empire, dies after a reging of more than 68 years. Because Otto has no heirs, the Principality of Göttingen comes to an end and is annexed by the principality of Calenberg.
- February 22 – At the University of Cambridge in England, Henry Abyngdon becomes the first person in the world to receive a degree of Bachelor of Music
- March 10 – Henry Beaufort, 3rd Duke of Somerset receives a general pardon from King Edward IV of England after having had his lands confiscated for his support of King Henry VI in the War of the Roses. Beaufort's renewed status lasts only until the Battle of Hexham 14 months later and he is beheaded on May 15, 1464.
- March 26 – By order of Sultan Mehmed II of the Ottoman Empire, David Komnenos, the last Emperor of Trebizond, is arrested at Adrianople and put in jail along with his sons Basil, Manuel and Georgios and his nephew Alexios, on charges of conspiracy to overthrow the Ottoman imperial government.

=== April–June ===
- April 3 – The Ottoman Army under the command of Isa Bey Ishaković captures the town of Argos, located in Greece but territory of the Republic of Venice, prompting concerns that the Ottoman Empire intends to spread their conquests to the Italian peninsula.
- April 28 – Pope Pius issues the papal bull In Minoribus Agnetes, retracting his earlier complaint against the late Pope Eugene IV and endorsing the previous work at the Council of Basel.
- May 19 – Battle of Ključ (1463): Under the leadership of General Mahmud Pasha Angelović, the Ottomans begin the siege of the city of Babovac while King Stephen of Bosnia flees to the Jajce fortress.
- May 25 – The Kingdom of Bosnia falls to the Ottoman Empire as the last monarch, King Stephen Tomašević, is captured and executed by orders of the Sultan Mehmed II. According to the chronicle of Benedetto Dei, the Sultan himself carries out the beheading.
- June 18 – The free imperial city of Rottweil, part of the Holy Roman Empire and now a part of Germany, becomes an associate state of the Swiss Confederacy.

=== July–September ===
- July 19 – The Treaty of Wiener Neustadt is signed between the Kingdom of Hungary and the Holy Roman Empire.
- July 28 – The Senate of the Republic of Venice votes to declare war on the Ottoman Empire.
- July 30 – In India, Muhammad Shah III Lashkari becomes the new ruler of the Bahmani Sultanate upon the death of his older brother, the Sultan Nizam-Ud-Din Ahmad III at Bidar (now in the state of Karnataka)
- August 1 – The Importation Act 1463, given royal assent on April 29 by King Edward IV goes into effect, setting a minimum price for imported grain at 6 shillings, 8 pence per unit. The legislation had been passed to encourage the purpose of farmers raising grain in England.
- August 14 – Upon the death of his father, Mani' ibn Rabi'a al-Muraydi, Rabi'a ibn Mani' al-Muraydi becomes the new ruler of the Emirate of Diriyah at its capital, Diriyah, near Riyadh in what is now Saudi Arabia.Munir al-Ajlani, History of Saudi Arabia, Part One: The First Saudi State (in Arabic) (2nd ed.).(Riyadh, 1933) pp. 53–54. Mani's descendants in the House of Saud, most notably Mani's great-great-great-great-great-great-grandson Ibn Saud, become the founders of Saudi Arabia.
- August 20 – The Republic of Venice renews its 1448 peace treaty with Albania, pledging that any treaty between Venice and the Ottoman Empire will include a guarantee of Albanian independence. The amended treaty also guarantees the presence of Venetian Navy ships in the Adriatic Sea to protect Albania, as well as the right to asylum in Venice for Albanians.
- September 12 – Pope Pius II calls for all Christians to participate in a crusade against the Ottoman Empire.
- September 15 – Battle of Vistula Lagoon: The navy of the Prussian Confederation defeats that of the Teutonic Order.

=== October–December ===
- October 8 – The Truce of Hesdin ends French support for the House of Lancaster in England.
- October 22 – Pope Pius II issues the papal bull Ezechielis prophetae, offering an indulgence to any Christians who take part in a crusade against the Ottoman Empire for at least six months or who donate funds to support it.
- November 1 – The last emperor of Trebizond, David Megas Komnenos, is beheaded in Constantinople two years after his capture by the Ottoman Empire, by orders of the Sultan Mehmed II, in addition to his sons Basil and Manuel and his daughter Anna (who had been a concubine of the Sultan) and two other people.
- November 27 – Skanderbeg declares war on the Ottoman Empire and attacks its troops near Ohrid.
- December 1 – Mary of Guelders, Queen regent of Scotland for her 12-year-old son, King James III, dies at the age of 30, prompting the new regent, Bishop James Kennedy, to contact the former King Henry VI of England to mediate a peace between England and Scotland.

=== Date unknown ===
- Muhammad Rumfa starts to rule in Kano.
- Corpus Hermeticum is translated into Latin, by Marsilio Ficino.

=== January–March ===
- January 6 – The first assembly ever of the States General of the Netherlands is held as representatives from at least 17 provinces of the Burgundian Netherlands gather at Bruges. At least 81 delegates come from the clergy, nobility and general public from the Duchy of Brabant, the County of Flanders, Lille, Douai and Orchies, the County of Artois, the County of Hainaut, the County of Holland, the County of Zeeland, the County of Namur, the Lordship of Mechelen, and the Boulonnais, all with the reluctant assent of Philip the Good, Duke of Burgundy.
- January 21 – The English Parliament opens its second session during the reign of King Edward IV, gathering at Westminster, and will remain in session until March 28, 1465.
- February 7 – After leading the Ottoman Empire's conquest of his native Bosnia, General Isa-beg Isaković becomes the first Ottoman Governor of Bosnia. The province will remain under Turkish control for more than 400 years until 1878.
- February 12 – The first Estates General in the Netherlands adjourns after five weeks.
- February 23 – Prince Zhu Jianshen becomes the new Ming dynasty Emperor of China, taking the regnal name Emperor Xianzong upon the death of his father, the Emperor Yingzong of Ming. His reign is subsequently designated as the Chenghua Era.
- March 23 – Pope Pius II excommunicates the entire town of Prudnik (now part of Poland and its Roman Catholic inhabitants for its failure to pay its share of the debts owed to the Duke of Oels, Konrad IV the Elder.Tadeusz Kwaśniewski, (16 August 2002).
- March 25 – The coronation ceremony of Matthias Hunyadi as King Mátyás I of Hungary takes place in Székesfehérvár as Dénes Szécsi places the Crown of Saint Stephen on the King's head. Corvinus has reigned for more than six years at the time of his formal coronation.

=== April–June ===
- April 17 –Swedish separatist rebel Kettil Karlsson leads his troops to victory over King Christian I of Sweden in the Battle of Haraker.
- April 25 – Battle of Hedgeley Moor in England: Yorkist forces under John Neville defeat the Lancastrians under Sir Ralph Percy, who is killed.
- May 1 – Edward IV of England secretly marries Elizabeth Woodville, and keeps the marriage a secret for five months afterwards.
- May 15 – Battle of Hexham: Neville defeats another Lancastrian army, this one led by King Henry and Queen Margaret themselves. This marks the end of organized Lancastrian resistance for several years.
- June 1 – The Treaty of York, a 15-year-truce is signed by representatives of the kingdoms of England (ruled by King Edward IV) and Scotland (ruled by King James III).
- June 18 – Pope Pius II himself shoulders the cross of the Crusades, and departs for Ancona to participate in person. He names Skanderbeg general captain of the Holy See, under the title Athleta Christi. This plan forces Skanderbeg to break his ten-year peace treaty with the Ottomans signed in 1463, by attacking their forces near Ohrid.
- June 23 – King Christian of Sweden who is also King of Denmark and of Norway in the union of the three kingdoms, is declared deposed from the latter throne. His deposed predecessor Charles VIII of Sweden is re-elected to the throne on August 9.

=== July–September ===
- July 10 – The siege of Jajce in Bosnia, a strategic fortress under the control of Hungary, is started by the Ottoman Sultan Mehmed II with 30,000 troops under his command.
- August 21 – Emperor Go-Hanazono of Japan abdicates, and is succeeded by his son, Emperor Go-Tsuchimikado.
- August 22 – Sultan Mehmed II abandons the siege of Jajce after the Hungarian defenders have resisted for more than six weeks. The Sultan makes his decision after learning that King Mátyás I of Hungary has mobilized troops to come to the fortresses defense.
- August 28 – Nine days after the death of Pope Pius II, 19 of the 29 Roman Catholic cardinals meet in Rome for the conclave to elect a successor. On the first day, before voting for Pope, the cardinals vote to continue Pius's planned crusade against the Ottoman Empire, limiting the college of cardinals to only 24, and allowing only one cardinal-nephew to serve as a candidate.
- August 30 – Cardinal Pietro Barbo, Bishop of Vicenza, is elected as the new Pope, receiving 14 of the 19 votes On the first ballot, Cardinal Barbo had 11 of the 14 required, while the other eight were divided among Ludovico Trevisan and Guillaume d'Estouteville. Barbo takes the regnal name of Pope Paul II, 211th pope of the Roman Catholic Church.
- August – Sophronius I of Constantinople, Ecumenical Patriarch of Constantinople and leader of the Eastern Orthodox Christian Church, dies after a reign of 11 years and is succeeded by the former Partriarch, Gennadius II.
- September 7 – At Leipzig, Ernest, Landgrave of Thuringia, 23, becomes the new Elector of Saxony upon the death of his father, Friederich II, while his younger brother Albert III, 21, succeeds his father as the new Duke of Saxony.
- September 15 – At the Battle of Ohrid in what is now North Macedonia, ends with the Albanian leader Skanderbeg and a supplementary force from the Venetian Republic, luring an estimated 10,000 Ottoman Empire soldiers out of the walled city of Ohrid, then captures the group as prisoners and seizes the city.
- September 26 – A group of merchants from the Republic of Venice arrive in London, apparently infected with the bubonic plague and the disease begins to spread rapidly.
- September 29 – King Edward IV of England surprises his advisors and the nation by introducing Elizabeth Woodville as his wife at Reading Abbey, and revealing that he had been married for almost five months, the ceremony having taken place on May 1. The marriage outrages King Edward's mentor, Richard Neville, 16th Earl of Warwick, who had been arranging a marriage between the King and Bona of Savoy, sister-in-law of France's King Louis XI.

=== October–December ===
- October 5 – An intelligence report sent by a Venetian agent in Bruges to the Seignory of Venice reports that the death rate in London from the plague has reached 200 people per day, only nine days after the first case was discovered.
- November 11 – Filip I is appointed by the Grand Duke of Moscow as the new List of metropolitans and patriarchs of Moscow, leader of the Russian Orthodox Church, after the September 13 death of the Patriarch Theodosius.
- December 26 – Kettil Karlsson takes the title of riksföreståndare (national director) and reduces the role of King Karl VIII to figurehead status.

=== Date unknown ===
- In China, a small rebellion occurs in the interior province of Huguang, during the Ming Dynasty; a subsequent rebellion springs up in Guangxi, where a rebellion of the Miao people and Yao people forces the Ming throne to respond, by sending 30,000 troops (including 1,000 Mongol cavalry) to aid the 160,000 local troops stationed in the region, to crush the rebellion that will end in 1466.
- Jehan Lagadeuc writes a Breton-French-Latin dictionary called the Catholicon. It is the first French dictionary as well as the first Breton dictionary of world history, and it will be published in 1499.
- Tenguella, the founder of the Empire of Great Fulo, becomes chief of the Fula people.

=== January–March ===
- January 24 – Chilia is conquered by Stephen the Great of Moldavia, following a second siege.
- January 29 – Amadeus IX becomes Duke of Savoy.
- January 30 – Charles VIII of Sweden is deposed. Clergyman Kettil Karlsson Vasa becomes Regent of Sweden.
- February 28 – In the Catalan Civil War, the Battle of Calaf is fought and Pedro V, the self-proclaimed King of Aragon, is defeated near Barcelona by the legitimate King, Juan II.
- March 25 – Queens' College, Cambridge, dormant since 1447, is re-established on the campus of the University of Cambridge by the queen consort of England, Elizabeth Woodville, with the official name of "the College of St. Margaret and St. Bernard in the University of Cambridge."
- March 28 – King Edward IV gives royal assent to acts passed by the English Parliament, including the Pattens Act 1464, regulating the manufacture of pattens, shoes with wooden soles and heels, and leather covering, declaring that "Patten-makers may make pattens of such asp as is not fit for shafts." The law is among several given royal assent to regulate clothing, including the Cloths Act, the Exportation of Wool Act and Contracting for Wool Act and the Shoemakers Act. The parliament, in session since April 29, 1463, closes.

=== April–June ===
- April 27 – Nobility in the Castilian city of Plasencia declare that they will consider King Enrique IV deposed, four months after the Liga Nobiliaria had issued an ultimatum to the King.
- May 14 – The Moroccan Revolt in Fez ousts the Marinid rulers, and leads to the killing of many Jews.
- May 26 – Elizabeth Woodville, Queen consort of Edward IV of England, is crowned in a lavish ceremony at Westminster Abbey.
- June 5 – The Farce of Ávila takes place in the Kingdom of Castile in Spain as noblemen in Ávila declare that King Enrique IV is deposed and that they will only recognize his half-brother, Alfonso, Prince of Asturias, as their monarch. King Enrique, who was the subject of a similar deposition in Plasencia on April 27, continues his reign of the rest of the kingdom from Madrid.

=== July–September ===
- July 13 – Henry of Lancaster, the former King Henry VI of England is captured at Waddington Hall in Lancashire, by Yorkist forces. Henry and his aide, Sir Richard Tunstall, had been staying as the guest of Sir Richard Tempest when his brother. Richard's brother, John Tempest attempts to arrest Henry, but Tunstall and Henry flee to the Clitheroe forest and are captured by the River Ribble.
- July 16 – At the Battle of Montlhéry, troops of King Louis XI fight inconclusively against an army of great nobles, organized as the League of the Public Weal.
- July 24 – Henry of Lancaster, the former King Henry VI of England, is imprisoned in the Tower of London by order of King Edward IV. His queen consort Margaret of Anjou and Edward of Westminster, Prince of Wales, have fled to France.
- August 11 – In Sweden, Kettil Karlsson Vasa, Bishop of Linköping, is succeeded as Regent by Archbishop Jöns Bengtsson Oxenstierna.
- September 7 – With the approval by the Holy Roman Emperor Friedrich III, the Bohemian captain Hinko Tannfeld to plunder the Hungarian town of Sopron.
- September 23 – Pope Matthew II of Alexandria, leader of the Coptic Christian Church, dies after a reign of 13 years. The Coptic papacy will remain vacant for five months until the election of Gabriel VI as the new Pope.
- September 29 – King Ferrante of Naples creates the award Order of the Ermine (L’Ordre de l’Hermine)
- September 30 – In what is now the state of Rajasthan in northwest India, Prince Rao Bika departs from Jodhpur with 600 soldiers to conquer the territory of Jangladesh.

=== October–December ===
- October 5 – The Treaty of Conflans is signed between King Louis XI of France and the Count of Charolais.
- October 20 – Near Sint-Truiden in what is now Belgium, Charles the Bold, son of the Duke of Burgundy leads his troops to victory over the rebellious province of Liege at the Battle of Montenaken, and 1,200 of the rebels are killed.
- October 29 – The treaty of Saint-Maur is signed between King Louis XI of France and the nobles of the League of the Public Weal (Ligue du bien public), ending the War of the Public Weal.
- November 13 – The Archbishop of Tours, Jean Bernard, excommunicates Bishop Jean de Beauvau of Angers for insubordination.
- November 26 – In Bohemia, Count Jaroslav Lev of Rožmitál departs from Prague along with 40 other Bohemian lords as part of King George's project of Establishment of Peace throughout Christendom.
- December 22 – The Treaty of Saint-Trond is signed to end the war between the Burgundian Netherlands (ruled by Philip the Good) and the Prince-Bishopric of Liège, ending the First Liège War, which had started four months earlier. Liège is allowed to keep its sovereignty at the cost of paying for the Burgundian war expenses and designating Charles the Bold, son of the Duke Philip, as heir to the rule of the area.
- December 23 – The Treaty of Caen is signed between King Louis XI of France and Francis II, Duke of Brittany.

=== Date unknown ===
- Massive flooding in central and southern China motivates the initial construction of hundreds of new bridges.
- The main altar of St Martin's Church, Colmar is finished by painter Caspar Isenmann.

=== January–March ===
- January 1 – King Edward IV of England gives royal assent to a 40-year extension to the 1464 Treaty of York between England and Scotland. The treaty, signed on June 1, 1464, was originally set for 15 years, to expire June 30, 1479. With the extension, approved by Scotland as well, peace between the two nations in Britain is extended to last until October 31, 1519.
- January 21 – The War of the Succession of Stettin is halted as the Treaty of Soldin is signed by Frederick II, Elector of Brandenburg, and two of the dukes of Pomerania, the brothers Erich II, Duke of Wolgast, and Wartislaw X, Duke of Rügen. The signing takes place at the town of Soldin in the Electorate of Brandenburg, now the city of Myślibórz in Poland. The brothers recognize Frederick II as their liege lord, and Brandenburg recognizes their rights to their fiefdoms.
- February 9 – Gabriel VI is elected as the new Pope of the Coptic Christian Church, succeeding the late Matthew II.
- March 8 – Galeazzo Maria Sforza becomes the new Duke of Milan upon the death of his father Francesco I Sforza, though at the time he is in France in a military expedition to help King Louis XI fight the Duke of Burgundy.
- March 20 – Galezzo Sforza enters Milan after working his way across the Duchy of Savoy, where he is in danger of being captured.

=== April–June ===
- April 19 – News reaches the Republic of Venice that the Ottoman Sultan is marching toward Italy with an army of 100,000 men.
- May 16 – Jahan Shah, Sultan of the Empire of Qara Qoyunlu that comprises most of what is now Iran, and parts of Azerbaijan, Armenia, Turkey and Iraq, begins an attempt to reclaim imperial territories from his younger brother, Uzun Hasan, and sets off from Tabriz with a large army.
- May 21 – On his deathbed, Bosnian nobleman Stjepan Vukčić Kosača, Grand Duke of Bosnia, dictates a testament proclaiming that his son Vladislav Hercegović, "brought the great Turk to Bosnia to the death and destruction of us all" and blames Vladislav for the end of the Kingdom of Bosnia. Vladislav becomes the Grand Duke of Bosnia the next day with the approval of the Ottoman governor.
- June 13 – Sin Sukchu resigns as Chief State Councillor (Yonguijong) of the Korean Empire, an office equivalent to prime minister, and is succeeded by Ku Ch'igwan.
- June 17 – Mülhausen, a free city within the Holy Roman Empire, joins the Swiss Confederacy in an alliance against the Habsburg dynasty including the Emperor Frederick III.

=== July–September ===
- July 9 – King James III of Scotland is taken hostage while he is hunting near his palace at Linlithgow, in a coup d'etat led by Lord Robert Boyd.
- July 12 – In the fourth year of the Ottoman–Venetian War, Admiral Vettore Cappello of the Republic of Venice Navy lands on the Greek mainland at Piraeus and the Venetians begin marching toward Athens to free it from Ottoman control.
- August 19 – With troops led by Charles the Bold, the Burgundian State commences a siege of the city of Dinant (now in Belgium). The city falls after six days on August 25.
- August 21 – Eric II, Duke of Pomerania, reconciles with King Casimir IV of Poland after six years of feuding.
- August 26 – In the Republic of Florence, an attempted coup d'etat against Piero di Cosimo de' Medici fails after his son Lorenzo discovers a roadblock that had been set by the conspirators to capture Medici during his planned trip to the Medici estate at Villa di Careggi.
- August 30 – A group of 41 Bavarian knights from the Straubing region gather at Regensburg and form an alliance against the Duke of Bavaria Munich, Albrecht IV. They refer to themselves as The Boeckler League" (Der Böcklerbundbund), led by Hans von Degenberg, and soon start a rebellion, the "Boeckler War". The League is dissolved by Imperial Decree from the Holy Roman Emperor Frederick III on October 28, 1467, and the League members vote for dissolution, but some continue the war.
- September 23 – Peace talks begin in the city of Nieszawka in Poland to end the Thirteen Years' War between the Kingdom of Poland and the Teutonic Knights.

=== October–December ===
- October 9 – King James III of Scotland gives royal assent Among the many acts passed into law by the Parliament, including the Hospitals Act ("for the reformacioune of the hospitalis") and the Benefices Act against Englishmen being allowed to receive a benefice (payment of a reward for services rendered) from the Crown or from the Church ("na Inglis man have benefice with Scotlande")
- October 11 – Eric of Pomerania buys the town of Lauenburg back from the Kingdom of Poland, seven years after it had been captured.
- October 13 – King James III of Scotland is forced by Lord Boyd to appear before the Scottish Parliament and to forgive Boyd and the other conspirators in the kidnapping that took place on July 9.
- October 19 – The Second Peace of Thorn is signed between King Casimir IV Jagiellon of Poland and the Teutonic Knights Grand Master, Ludwig von Erlichshausen, ending the Thirteen Years' War.
- November 22 – A messenger from the Venetian front in the war in Albania against the Ottomans brings news of planned attacks by the Ottoman General Sinan Bey against the Republic of Venice's Albanian territory, and an offer received from the Ottomans to negotiate a ceasefire or treaty.
- November 26 – Han Myŏnghoe becomes the new Chief State Councillor (Yonguijong) of the Korea, succeeding Ku Ch'igwan, who served for less than six months.
- December 12 – The Albanian General Skanderbeg arrives in Rome to offer his aid to the Christian League in the defense of Italy against the Ottoman Empire.
- December 23 – Pope Paul II excommunicates the King of Bohemia, George of Poděbrady, releasing all Bohemian citizens from their oaths of to the king.

=== January–March ===
- January 7 – At Rome, Pope Paul II holds a secret papal consistory, with the Albanian general Skanderbeg, to ask the cardinals assembled to provide Skanderbeg with 5,000 ducats (equivalent to 17.5 kilograms (39 lb) of gold based on the worth of a ducat of 3.5g of gold). While the cardinals respond that 5,000 ducats is insufficient, the Pope explains that the additional money will have to wait until the war in Italy is concluded.
- January 15 – In one of his first acts as the new Patriarch of the Eastern Orthodox Church, Dionysius I removes George Galesiotes and Manuel Christonymos from office in the Church as an act of revenge against their failure to support his candidacy.
- February 14 – Still unable to receive more than 7,500 ducats, General Skanderbeg departs from Rome with no plans for future aid to the Papal States, and receives word that he is needed back in Albania to defend the kingdom against the Ottoman invasion.
- February 23 – (19th day of 1st month of Bunshō 2) The Ōnin War begins with the Battle of Goryo, also called the "Battle of the Spirits", ends after two days near Kyoto initially as a battle between to factions in the Hatakeyama clan. Hatakeyama Yoshinari defeats Hatakeyama Masanaga for control of the Kami-Goryo Shrine. The Onin War will continue for more than 10 years until ending on 25 December 1477.
- March 29 – On Easter Sunday, in the Bohemian city of Kunvald (now part of the Czech Republic), the Unity of the Brethren (commonly called the Moravian Church) is formed as one of the first Protestant churches by four Hussite bishops. Despite persecution, it progresses to as many as 100,000 adherents within 100 years.

=== April–June ===
- April 23 – The Albanian League of Lezhë, aided by troops from the Republic of Venice, is successful in ending the Ottoman siege of the fortress at Krujë after 10 months.
- May 8 – Henry IV, Duke of Mecklenburg and Frederick III, Elector of Saxony, send a warning to the various dukes of Pomerania to abide by the 1466 Treaty of Soldin, or face an economic boycott by both nations. The Duchy of Pomerania-Stettin refuses to swear allegiance to Brandenburg, which begins a war with Stettin a year later.
- June 15 – Philip the Good is succeeded as Duke of Burgundy, by Charles the Bold.
- June 27 – (26th day of 5th month of Ōnin 1) In Japan, the Battle of Kamigyo begins in Kyoto as the "Eastern Army" of Takeda Nobutaka and Jōshin'in Mitsunobu (the aide to Hatakeyama Masanaga, who lost the Battle of Goryo) invade temples on both sides of the Ogawa River with 160,000 troops, and seize control of Kyoto in an attempt to capture its military governor, Isshiki Yoshinao.

=== July–September ===
- July 25 – In one of the largest battles of the 15th century in Italy, the Battle of Molinella is fought along the Idice River near Bologna by the army of the Republic of Venice against the armies of the Republic of Florence and the Duchy of Milan. The battle marks the first extensive use of artillery and firearms in combat in Italy, and while relatively few of the 27,000 troops from both sides sustain casualties (500 dead, 1,000 wounded) the battle is notable for the killing of almost 1,000 horses. Although both sides withdraw, the Venetian General Bartolomeo Colleoni abandons further attempts to conquer Milan.
- August 20 – As the War of the Castilian Succession continues, an attempt by Alfonso, Prince of Asturias to defeat his half-brother, King Enrique IV of Castile, in the Second Battle of Olmedo.
- September 11 – Sejo, Emperor of Korea (in the Joseon dynasty) receives the imperial edict from China's Xianzong of Ming, directing the Koreans to join Chinese forces in subjugating the Jurchen state in Manchuria. Sejo orders the mobilization of 10,000 Korean troops but instructs the Joseon commander to keep the Korean troops independent from the Chinese force, to wait until the Chinese attack before assisting with Korean troops, and to avoid confrontation with the Jurchen cavalry unless it appears that the Chinese army is winning.

=== October–December ===
- October 9 – (10 Jumada I 872 AH) Sayf al-Din Bilbay becomes the new Sultan of Egypt and Syria upon the death of the Sultan Sayf al-Din Khushqadam, who had reigned since 1461.
- October 17 –
  - King James III of Scotland gives royal assent to numerous laws passed by the Scottish Parliament in its six day session at Edinburgh, including the Ferries Act requiring the ramps of ferry boats be improved to support the weight of horses being shipped ("That briggis of buirdis be maide at ferryis for the eis of schipping of hors") and three acts relating to coins and currency.
  - Choe Hang is appointed as the news prime minister (yonguijong) of Korea by the Emperor Sejo, succeeding Sim Hoe.
- October 29 – At the Battle of Brustem, Charles the Bold defeats the Prince-Bishopric of Liège.
- November 11 – At the Battle of Chapakchur, in what is now the Bingöl Province of Turkey, the tribal confederation of Aq Qoyunlu, with 12,000 cavalry and infantry led by Uzun Hasan, makes a surprise attack against 6,000 troops of the Qara Qoyunlu nation, commanded by the Sultan Jahan Shah. The Sultan is decapitated in the battle while trying to flee.
- November 12 – Regent of Sweden Erik Axelsson Tott supports the re-election of deposed Charles VIII of Sweden to the throne.
- December 5 – Sayf al-Din Bilbay, Sultan of Egypt and Syria, is overthrown less than two months after becoming the monarch, as the Dhahiri branch of the Mamluks captures him. The Dhahiris proclaim Al-Malik al-Zahir Timurbugha al-Rumi (referred to as "Timurbugha") as the new Sultan.
- December 15 – At the Battle of Baia, troops under Stephen III of Moldavia decisively defeat the forces of Matthias Corvinus, King of Hungary, at Baia (present-day Romania). This is the last Hungarian attempt to subdue the Principality of Moldavia.

=== Date unknown ===
- Third Siege of Krujë: A few months after the failure of the second siege, Mehmed II leads another unsuccessful Ottoman invasion of Albania.
- While Hassan III of the Maldives is on Hajj, Sayyidh Muhammad deposes his son, acting regent. On his return, Hassan regains the throne.
- Some papal abbreviators are arrested and tortured on the orders of Pope Paul II, among them Filippo Buonaccorsi.
- King Matthias Corvinus founds the first university in Slovakia, the Universitas Istropolitana in Bratislava.
- The first European polyalphabetic cipher is invented by Leon Battista Alberti (approximate date).
- Juan de Torquemada's book, Meditationes, seu Contemplationes devotissimae, is published.

=== January–March ===
- January 31 – Abu Al-Nasr Sayf ad-Din Al-Ashraf Qaitbay (generally referred to as "Qaitbay") is installed by Mamluk Egyptian nobles as the new Sultan of Egypt and Syria, the day after the Sultan Timurbugha had been removed after less than two months on the throne.
- February 15 – The Earl of Desmond, Thomas FitzGerald, until recently the Kingdom of England's Lord Deputy of Ireland, is beheaded on orders of his successor, John Tiptoft, shortly after being arrested on accusations of treason against the Crown, then quickly tried and convicted in a show trial.
- February 16 – A "marriage treaty" is signed between representatives of the Kingdom of England and the Duchy of Burgundy, providing for the marriage of King Edward IV's sister, Margaret of York, to Charles the Bold, Duke of Burgundy.
- March 14 – King Edward IV ratifies the treaty permitting his sister to marry the Duke of Burgundy
- March 31 – King Matyas of Hungary issues a declaration of war against King Jiri of Bohemia, starting a war that will last 10 years.

=== April–June ===
- April 1 – King Louis XI summons a meeting of France's parliament, the Estates-General, and obtains approval of all concessions he had previously made to the Kingdom of England, including those with reference to Normandy.
- April 25 – At Stirling in Scotland, the Lord Boyd, the regent for King James III, enters an agreement for joint rule with the members of his council (the bishops of Glasgow and of Aberdeen, the earls of Argyll and of Arran, the provost of Lincluden, and Archibald Whitelaw) to co-operate in the governing of Scotland.
- May 30 – After invading Syria, Shah Suwar, the Ottoman Governor of Dulkadir, triumphs in battle over various Mamluk Syrian governors and emirs and captures Kulaksiz. The Governor of Damascus, Uzbek Bey, is seriously wounded but manages to escape.
- June 7 – King Edward IV of England gives royal assent to numerous laws passed by the English Parliament, including the Cloths Act, the Liveries Act and the Sheriffs Act.

=== July–September ===
- July 24 – (5th waxing of Wagaung, 830 ME) At Pyay (now in Myanmar) Thihathura of Ava becomes the new Burmese King of Ava upon the death of his father, Narapati I of Ava.
- July 30 – Catherine Cornaro is married by proxy to James II of Cyprus, beginning the Venetian conquest of Cyprus.
- August 14 – The Lancastrians surrender Harlech Castle to King Edward IV after a seven-year siege.
- August 26 – Baeda Maryam succeeds his father Zara Yaqob, as Emperor of Ethiopia.
- September 8 – The Orkney Islands are pledged to Scotland by King Christian I of Kingdom of Norway in consideration of an agreement for the marriage of 16-year-old King James III of Scotland to Princess Margrete, King Christian's daughter, with the islands pledged as security against the payment of the dowry. As the money is never paid, the connection with the crown of Scotland becomes perpetual.
- September 9 – At Hanseong, Prince Yi Hwang of the Joseon dynasty becomes the new King of Korea, taking the regnal name Yejong, upon the death of his father, King Sejo.
- September 18 – The Great Council of the Republic of Venice curbs the power of the Council of Ten through legislation restricting them to acting on emergency matters.
- September 19 – In the Kingdom of Castile in Spain, near El Tiemblo, the "Treaty of the Bulls of Guisando" (Tratado de los Toros de Guisando) is signed between King Enrique IV the Impotent and his half-sister, Princess Isabella. The treaty, executed at the ancient sculpture of bulls near Ávila, designates Isabella as heiress to the throne of Castile and Leon. She will become the Queen upon Enrique's death six years later.

=== October–December ===
- October 14 – The Treaty of Péronne is signed by Charles the Bold, Duke of Burgundy, and Louis XI of France.
- October 30 – Troops of Charles the Bold conduct the Sack of Liège.
- November 20 – The Hanseatic warship Hanneke Vrome capsizes and sinks off of the coast of Finland, killing its estimated 180 passengers and crew, along with a valuable cargo including 10,000 Rheingulden coins, equivalent to at least 34,000 kilograms (75,000 lb) of gold. The ship had been sailing between the Hanseatic cities of Lübeck (in Germany) and Reval (now Tallinn, capital of Estonia) when it ran into a gale.
- December 9 – In the course of the "Boeckler War" in the Duchy of Bavaria-Munich, the troops of Duke Albert IV begin the siege of Weissenstein Castle in reprisal for the rebellion of Lord Eberwein von Degenburg. The troops, commanded by Georg of Lerchenfeld capture the castle before Christmas and burn it to the ground.

=== Date unknown ===
- Fire breaks out at Metz Cathedral in France.
- Sonni Ali, king of the Songhai Empire, takes power over Timbuktu.

=== January–March ===
- January 1 – Pope Paul II issues a papal bull establishing the military order of the Knights of Saint George at the request of Frederick III, Holy Roman Emperor, and invests Johann Siebenhirter as the order's first Grand Master.
- February 4 –
  - (22 Rajab 873 AH) At the Battle of Qarabagh, in what is now Azerbaijan, troops led by Uzun Hasan, ruler of Aq Qoyunlu, decisively defeat the Timurids of Samrkand, ruled by Abu Sa'id Mirza. Mirza is taken a prisoner of war and is executed four days later on February 8.
  - Han Myŏnghoe is appointed by King Yejong of Korea as the new Chief State Councillor, replacing Pak Wŏnhyŏng.
- March 24 – With Abu Sa'id Mirza having been killed at the battle of Qarabagh, the Timurid prince, Sultan Husayn Bayqara captures Herat (now in Afghanistan), the capital of the Timurid Empire, and proclaims himself the Emperor.

=== April–June ===
- April 23 – Cardinal Jean Balue, a close adviser of King Louis XI, is arrested for conspiring with Charles the Bold, Duke of Burgundy, and is charged with treason. Since there is a dispute over whether a Roman Catholic cleric can be tried by the royal court rather than an eccleastical court, Balue is spared the death penalty but spends the next 11 years in prison.
- May 3 – At Olomouc, Hungarian King Matyáš Korvín is elected by the Czech Catholic estates to be the King of Bohemia and his rule is accepted by the occupied regions of Moravia, Silesia and Lusatia, though the other Bohemian estates remain loyal to the Bohemian King Jiří z Poděbrad.
- June 3 – King Henry IV of Castile makes a gift of Gibraltar to Enrique de Guzmán, 2nd Duke of Medina Sidonia, as a reward for Guzman's work in capturing Gibraltar from the Moors.

=== July–September ===
- July 14 – The Holy Roman Emperor Frederick III issues a decree nullifying the 1466 Treaty of Soldin between Brandenburg and Pomerania.
- July 24 – The royalist Yorkists are defeated by rebels at the Battle of Edgcote in Northamptonshire, and King Edward IV is taken prisoner. Rebel leader Richard Neville, 16th Earl of Warwick, temporarily holds power to rule England but in September, Edward IV is freed and returns to the throne.
- August 1 – The Order of Saint Michael ( Ordre de Saint-Michel) is founded by King Louis XI of France as a response to the 's Order of the Golden Fleece.
- September 27 – Hong Yunsŏng becomes the new head of government of the Kingdom of Korea as the new Chief State Councillor for King Yejong, replacing Han Myŏnghoe.

=== October–December ===
- October 13 – King Edward IV returns to London after having been imprisoned since July since being captured at the Battle of Edgcote.
- October 19 – Ferdinand II of Aragon marries Isabella I of Castile in Valladolid, bringing about a dynastic union.
- November 9 – King Louis XI, having taken back the Duchy of Normandy from the control of his inept younger brother, Charles of Valois, Duke of Berry, pledges at Rouen that the Duchy will never be ceded again. In a ceremony before the Exchequer of Normandy, the Duchy's administrative court, King Louis places the ducal ring (symbolic of the office as a ring worn by the Duke) upon an anvil and the ring is smashed.
- November 27 – King James III gives royal assent to numerous acts passed by the Parliament of Scotland.
- December 9 – Lorenzo de' Medici becomes the Lord of Florence, the de facto executive of the Florentine Republic in Italy, upon the death of his father, Piero di Cosimo de' Medici.

=== Date unknown ===
- Sigismund of Austria sells Upper Alsace to Charles the Bold, in exchange for aid in a war against the Swiss.
- Moctezuma I, Aztec ruler of Tenochtitlan, dies and is succeeded by Axayacatl.
- Anglo-Hanseatic War breaks out.
- Marsilio Ficino completes his translation of the collected works of Plato, writes Commentary on Plato's Symposium on Love, and starts to work on Platonic Theology.

== Significant people ==
- Charles I (the Bold) (1433–1477), Duke of Burgundy, r. 1467–1477
- Jean Fouquet of France (1420–1481), painter
- Francis II (1433–1488), Duke of Brittany, r. 1458–1488
- Gendun Drup of Tibet (1391–1474), First Dalai Lama
- Diogo Gomes of Portugal (1420–1485), navigator, explorer and writer
- Johannes Gutenberg of Mainz (1395?–1468), printer and inventor of the movable type printing press
- Prince Henry the Navigator of Portugal (1394–1460), Portuguese prince and patron of exploration
- William Herbert of Wales (1423–1469), Pro-York nobleman
- Sir Thomas Malory of England (1405?–1471), soldier, member of Parliament, political prisoner, and author of Le Morte d'Arthur
- Richard Neville of England (1428–1471), nobleman, administrator, and military commander
- Demetrios Palaiologos of Morea (1407–1470), Byzantine Prince and Despot of Morea
- Thomas Palaiologos of Morea (1409–1465), Byzantine Prince and Despot of Morea
- Philip III (the Good) (1396–1467), Duke of Burgundy, r. 1419–1467
- Richard Plantagenet, Duke of Gloucester (1452–1483), English Prince, Yorkist commander, and future King of England
- Richard of York, 3rd Duke of York of England (1411-1460), nobleman, military commander, and Yorkist claimant to the Throne of England
- Mar Shimun IV, Patriarch of the Assyrian Church of the East (Patriarchate then based in Mosul), held position 1437–1497
- Tlacaelel (1397-1487), Tlacochcalcatl of the Aztec Empire
- Jasper Tudor of Wales (c.1431–1495), nobleman and adventurer
- Owen Tudor of Wales (c.1400–1461), soldier and courtier at the court of the English Kings
- Andrea del Verrocchio of Florence (1435–1488), painter, sculptor, and goldsmith

== Births ==
1460

- May 8 – Frederick I, Margrave of Brandenburg-Ansbach (d. 1536)
- June 1 – Enno I, Count of East Frisia (1466–1491) (d. 1491)
- September 29 – Louis II de la Trémoille, French military leader (d. 1525)
- date unknown
  - Vasco da Gama, Portuguese explorer (d. 1524)
  - Isabella Hoppringle, Scottish abbess and spy (d. 1538)
  - Svante Nilsson, regent of Sweden (d. 1512)
  - Ana de Mendonça, Portuguese courtier (d. 1542)
  - Edward Sutton, 2nd Baron Dudley, English nobleman (d. 1532)
- probable
  - Antoine Brumel, Flemish composer (d. 1515)
  - Tristão da Cunha, Portuguese explorer (d. 1540)
  - Katarzyna Weiglowa, Jewish martyr (d. 1539)
  - Gwerful Mechain, Welsh erotic poet (d. 1502)
  - Konstanty Ostrogski, Grand Hetman of Lithuania (d. 1530)
  - Tilman Riemenschneider, German sculptor (d. 1531)
  - Arnolt Schlick, German organist and composer (d. after 1521)
  - Charles Somerset, 1st Earl of Worcester, English nobleman (d. 1526)
  - Rodrigo de Bastidas, Spanish conquistador (d. 1527)
  - Ponce de Leon, Spanish conquistador

1461

- February 6 – Džore Držić, Croatian poet and playwright (d. 1501)
- February 19 – Domenico Grimani, Italian nobleman (d. 1523)
- March 11 – Diego Hurtado de Mendoza, 3rd Duke of the Infantado, Spanish noble (d. 1531)
- April 3 – Anne of France, French princess regent, eldest daughter of Louis XI of France and Charlotte of Savoy (d. 1522)
- May 3 – Raffaele Riario, Italian cardinal (d. 1521)
- May 25 – Zanobi Acciaioli, librarian of the Vatican (d. 1519)
- August 5 – Alexander Jagiellon, King of Poland (d. 1506)
- September 15 – Jacopo Salviati, Italian politician and son-in-law of Lorenzo de' Medici (d. 1533)
- October 1 – Amalie of Brandenburg, Countess Palatine and Duchess of Zweibruecken and Veldenz (d. 1481)
- December 28 – Louise of Savoy, Nun (d. 1503)
- date unknown
  - Alessandro Alessandri, Italian jurist (d. 1523)
  - Bohuslav Hasištejnský z Lobkovic, Bohemian nobleman (d. 1510)
  - Nicholas West, English bishop and diplomat (d. 1533)

1462

- January 2 – Piero di Cosimo, Italian artist (d. 1522)
- January 8 – Walraven II van Brederode, Dutch noble (d. 1531)
- February 1 – Johannes Trithemius, German scholar and cryptographer (d. 1516)
- February 21 – Joanna la Beltraneja, princess of Castile (d. 1530)
- May 19 – Baccio D'Agnolo, Italian woodcarver, sculptor and architect (d. 1543)
- May 31 – Philipp II, Count of Hanau-Lichtenberg (1489–1503) (d. 1504)
- June 27 – Louis XII, King of France (1498–1515), King of Naples (1501–1504) (d. 1515)
- July 21 – Queen Jeonghyeon, Korean royal consort (d. 1530)
- September 8 – Henry Medwall, first known English vernacular dramatist (d. 1501)
- September 16 – Pietro Pomponazzi, Italian philosopher (d. 1525)
- September 26 – Engelbert, Count of Nevers, younger son of John I (d. 1506)
- November 26 – Alexander, Count Palatine of Zweibrücken and Count of Veldenz (1489–1514) (d. 1514)
- date unknown
  - Jodocus Badius, Flemish printer (d. 1535)
- probable – Edmund Dudley, minister of Henry VII of England (d. 1510)

1463

- January 17
  - Antoine Duprat, French cardinal (d. 1535)
  - Frederick III, Elector of Saxony (d. 1525)
- February 24 – Giovanni Pico della Mirandola, Italian philosopher (d. 1494)
- June 14 – Henry IV, Duke of Brunswick-Lüneburg, German noble (d. 1514)
- August 4 – Lorenzo di Pierfrancesco de' Medici, Florentine patron of the arts (d. 1503)
- September 29 – Louis I, Count of Löwenstein and founder of the House of Löwenstein-Wertheim (d. 1523)
- October 20 or October 29 – Alessandro Achillini, Bolognese philosopher (d. 1512)
- November 29 – Andrea della Valle, Italian Catholic cardinal (d. 1534)
- December 25 – Johann of Schwarzenberg, German judge and poet (d. 1528)
- date unknown – Caterina Sforza, countess and regent of Forli (d. 1509)

1464

- April 23
  - Robert Fayrfax, English Renaissance composer (d. 1521)
  - Joan of France, Duchess of Berry (d. 1505)
- May 6 – Sophia Jagiellon, Margravine of Brandenburg-Ansbach, Polish princess (d. 1512)
- May 30 – Barbara of Brandenburg, Bohemian queen (d. 1515)
- June 27 – Ernst II of Saxony, Archbishop of Magdeburg (1476–1513) and Administrator of Halberstadt (1480–1513) (d. 1513)
- July 1 – Clara Gonzaga, Italian noble (d. 1503)
- November 19 – Emperor Go-Kashiwabara of Japan (d. 1526)
- date unknown
  - Nezahualpilli, Aztec ruler (d. 1515)
  - Philippe Villiers de L'Isle-Adam, Grand Master of the Knights Hospitallers (d. 1534)

1465

- January 1 – Lachlan Cattanach Maclean, 11th Chief, Scottish clan chief (d. 1523)
- February 4 – Frans van Brederode, Dutch rebel (d. 1490)
- February 6 – Scipione del Ferro, Italian mathematician (d. 1526)
- March 16 – Kunigunde of Austria, Archduchess of Austria (d. 1520)
- June 10 – Mercurino di Gattinara, Italian statesman and jurist (d. 1530)
- June 24 – Isabella del Balzo, queen consort of Naples (d. 1533)
- July 29 – Ichijō Fuyuyoshi, Japanese court noble (d. 1514)
- August 17 – Philibert I, Duke of Savoy (d. 1482)
- September 11 – Bernardo Accolti, Italian poet (d. 1536)
- October 14 – Konrad Peutinger, German humanist and antiquarian (d. 1547)
- December 11 – Ashikaga Yoshihisa, Japanese shōgun (d. 1489)
- date unknown
  - Şehzade Ahmet, oldest son of Sultan Bayezid II (d. 1513)
  - Hector Boece, Scottish historian (d. 1536)
  - William Cornysh, English composer (d. 1523)
  - George Neville, Duke of Bedford, English nobleman (d. 1483)
  - Diego Velázquez de Cuéllar, Spanish conquistador (d. 1524)
- probable
  - Gil Vicente, Portuguese poet and playwright
  - Francisco Álvares, Portuguese missionary and explorer (d. 1541))
  - Mette Dyre, Danish noblewoman, nominal sheriff and chancellor
  - Johann Tetzel, German Dominican priest (d. 1519)

1466

- February 11 – Elizabeth of York, queen of Henry VII of England (d. 1503)
- May – Elisabeth of Hesse-Marburg, German landgravine (d. 1523)
- May 22 – Marino Sanuto the Younger, Italian historian (d. 1536)
- June 18 – Ottaviano Petrucci, Italian music printer (d. 1539)
- July 5 – Giovanni Sforza, Italian noble (d. 1510)
- August 10 – Francesco II Gonzaga, Marquess of Mantua (d. 1519)
- September 9 – Ashikaga Yoshitane, Japanese shōgun (d. 1523)
- October 28 – Erasmus, Dutch philosopher (d. 1536)
- November 16 – Francesco Cattani da Diacceto, Florentine philosopher (d. 1522)
- November 26 – Edward Hastings, 2nd Baron Hastings, English noble (d. 1506)
- November 30 – Andrea Doria, Genoese condottiero and admiral (d. 1560)
- Probable – Moctezuma II, Aztec Tlatoani (ruler) of Tenochtitlán (modern Mexico City), 1502–1520, son of Axayacatl (d. 1520)

1467

- January – John Colet, English churchman and educational pioneer (d. 1519)
- January 1
  - Philip of Cleves, Bishop of Nevers, Amiens, Autun (d. 1505)
  - Sigismund I the Old, King of Poland and Grand Duke of Lithuania (d. 1548)
- January 4
  - Henry the Younger of Stolberg, Stadtholder of Friesland (1506–1508) (d. 1508)
  - Bodo VIII, Count of Stolberg-Wernigerode (1511–1538) (d. 1538)
- January 26 – Guillaume Budé, French scholar (d. 1540)
- February 2 – Columba of Rieti, Italian Dominican tertiary Religious Sister (d. 1501)
- March 19 – Bartolomeo della Rocca, Italian scholar (d. 1504)
- March 21 – Caritas Pirckheimer, German nun (d. 1532)
- May 8 – Adalbert of Saxony, Administrator of Mainz (1482–1484) (d. 1484)
- May 31 – Sibylle of Brandenburg, Duchess of Jülich and Berg (d. 1524)
- August 11 – Mary of York, daughter of King Edward IV of England (d. 1482)
- August 25 – Francisco Fernández de la Cueva, 2nd Duke of Alburquerque, Spanish duke (d. 1526)
- October 21 – Giovanni il Popolano, Italian diplomat (d. 1498)
- November 9
  - Charles II, Duke of Guelders, Count of Zutphen from 1492 (d. 1538)
  - Philippa of Guelders, twin sister of Charles, Duke of Guelders, Duchess consort of Lorraine (d. 1547)
- November 25 – Thomas Dacre, 2nd Baron Dacre, Knight of Henry VIII of England (d. 1525)
- date unknown
  - John Bourchier, 2nd Baron Berners, English translator (d. 1553)
  - Krzysztof Szydłowiecki, Polish nobleman (d. 1532)
  - John Yonge, English ecclesiastic and diplomatist (d. 1516)
- probable – William Latimer, English churchman and scholar (d. 1545)

1468

- February 29 – Pope Paul III (d. 1549)
- March 28 – Charles I, Duke of Savoy (d. 1490)
- April 27 – Frederick Jagiellon, Primate of Poland (d. 1503)
- May 31 – Philip, Prince of Anhalt-Köthen, German prince (d. 1500)
- June 30 – John, Elector of Saxony (1525–1532) (d. 1532)
- July 24 – Catherine of Saxony, Archduchess of Austria (d. 1524)
- August 3 – Albert I, Duke of Münsterberg-Oels, Count of Kladsko (d. 1511)
- August 26 – Bernardo de' Rossi, Italian bishop (d. 1527)
- December 21 – William Conyers, 1st Baron Conyers, English baron (d. 1524)
- date unknown
  - Marino Ascanio Caracciolo, Italian cardinal (d. 1538)
  - Mir Chakar Khan Rind, Baloch chieftain (d. 1565)
  - Juan de Zumárraga, Spanish Franciscan prelate and first bishop of Mexico (d. 1548)
- probable – Alonso de Ojeda, Spanish conquistador and explorer (d. 1515)

1469

- February 13 – Elia Levita, Renaissance Hebrew grammarian (d. 1549)
- February 20 – Thomas Cajetan, Italian philosopher (d. 1534)
- March 20 – Cecily of York, English princess (d. 1507)
- November 29 – Guru Nanak, Sikh guru (d. 1539)
- April 29 – William II, Landgrave of Hesse (d. 1509)
- May 3 – Niccolò Machiavelli, Italian historian and political author (d. 1527)
- May 31 – King Manuel I of Portugal (d. 1521)
- June 20 – Gian Galeazzo Sforza, Duke of Milan (d. 1494)
- August 4 – Margaret of Saxony, Duchess of Brunswick-Lüneburg (d. 1528)
- August 26 – King Ferdinand II of Naples (d. 1496)
- date unknown
  - John III of Navarre (d. 1516)
  - Silvio Passerini, Italian politician (d. 1529)
  - Laura Cereta, Italian humanist and feminist (d. 1499)
- probable – Vasco da Gama, Portuguese explorer (d. 1524)

== Deaths ==
1460

- February 29 – Albert III, Duke of Bavaria-Munich (b. 1401)
- July 10
  - Humphrey Stafford, 1st Duke of Buckingham, English military leader (b. 1402)
  - John Talbot, 2nd Earl of Shrewsbury (b. c. 1413)
  - Thomas Percy, 1st Baron Egremont, English baron (b. 1422)
- July 19 – Lord Scales, English commander (b. 1397)
- August 3 – King James II of Scotland (b. 1430)
- September 20 – Gilles Binchois, Flemish composer (b. c. 1400)
- September 25 – Katharina of Hanau, German countess regent (b. 1408)
- November 13 – Prince Henry the Navigator, Portuguese patron of exploration (b. 1394)
- December 14 – Guarino da Verona, Italian humanist (b. 1370)
- December 30
  - Edmund, Earl of Rutland, brother of Kings Edward IV of England and Richard III of England (b. 1443)
  - Richard of York, 3rd Duke of York, claimant to the English throne (in battle) (b. 1411)
- December 31 – Richard Neville, 5th Earl of Salisbury, English politician (executed) (b. 1400)
- date unknown
  - Francesco II Acciaioli, last Duke of Athens (murdered by consent)
  - Israel Isserlein, Austrian Jewish scholar (b. 1390)
  - Reginald Pecock, deposed Welsh bishop and writer (b. c. 1392)

1461

- February 2 – Owen Tudor, Welsh founder of the Tudor dynasty (executed)
- March 28 – John Clifford, 9th Baron de Clifford (in battle)
- March 29
  - Henry Percy, 3rd Earl of Northumberland (in battle) (b. 1421)
  - Lionel de Welles, 6th Baron Welles
- April 8 – Georg von Peuerbach, Austrian astronomer (b. 1423)
- May 15 – Domenico Veneziano, Italian painter (b. c. 1410)
- July 22 – King Charles VII of France (b. 1403)
- September 21 – Sophia of Halshany, queen consort of Poland (b. 1405)
- September 23 – Charles, Prince of Viana, King of Navarre (b. 1421)
- October 7 – Jean Poton de Xaintrailles, follower of Joan of Arc (b. c. 1390)
- November 6 – John de Mowbray, 3rd Duke of Norfolk (b. 1415)
- probable – Jonah, Metropolitan of Moscow

1462

- February 23 – Thomas Tuddenham, English landowner (b. 1401)
- February 26 – John de Vere, 12th Earl of Oxford (b. 1408)
- February 27 – Władysław II of Płock, Polish noble (b. 1448)
- March 27 – Vasily II of Moscow, Grand Prince of Moscow (b. 1415)
- March 31 – Isidore II of Constantinople, Ecumenical Patriarch of Constantinople
- April 26 – William Percy, medieval Bishop of Carlisle (b. 1428)
- April 28 – Oldřich II of Rosenberg, Bohemian nobleman (b. 1403)
- August 26 – Catherine Zaccaria, Despotess of the Morea
- September 17 – Anna of Saxony, Landgravine of Hesse, German royalty (b. 1420)
- November 11 – Anne of Cyprus, Italian noble (b. 1418)
- November 13 – Anne of Austria, Landgravine of Thuringia, consort of William III, Landgrave of Thuringia (b. 1432)
- November 25 – John Stourton, 1st Baron Stourton, English baron (b. 1400)
- date unknown
  - King Esen Buqa II of Moghulistan
  - Niccolò Gattilusio, last Prince of Lesbos
  - Dài Jìn, Chinese painter (b. 1388)

1463

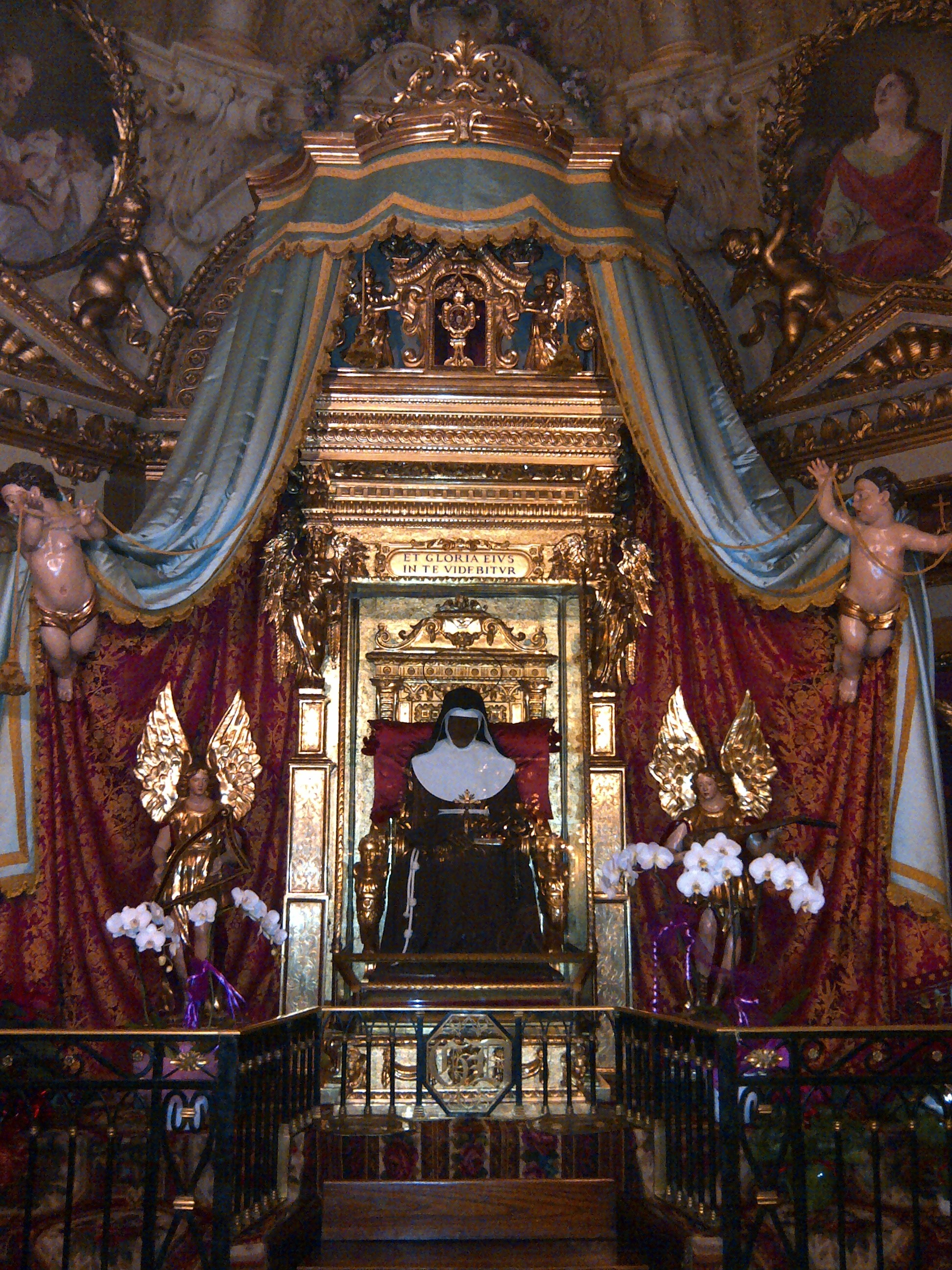
Saint Catherine of Bologna

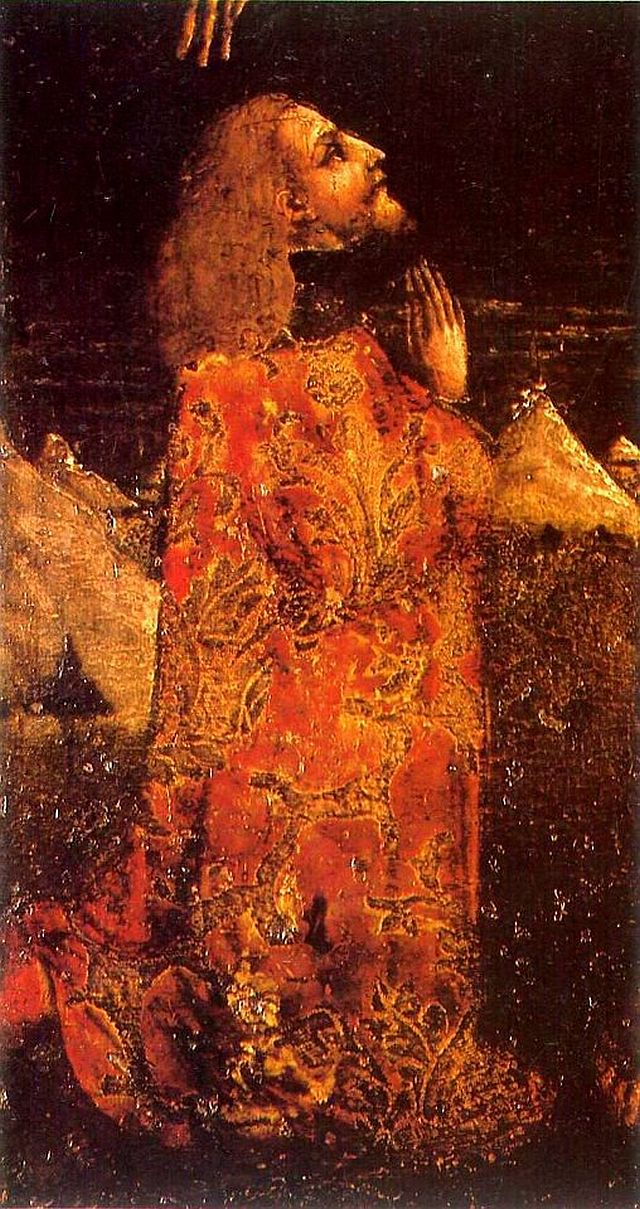
King Stephen Tomašević of Bosnia

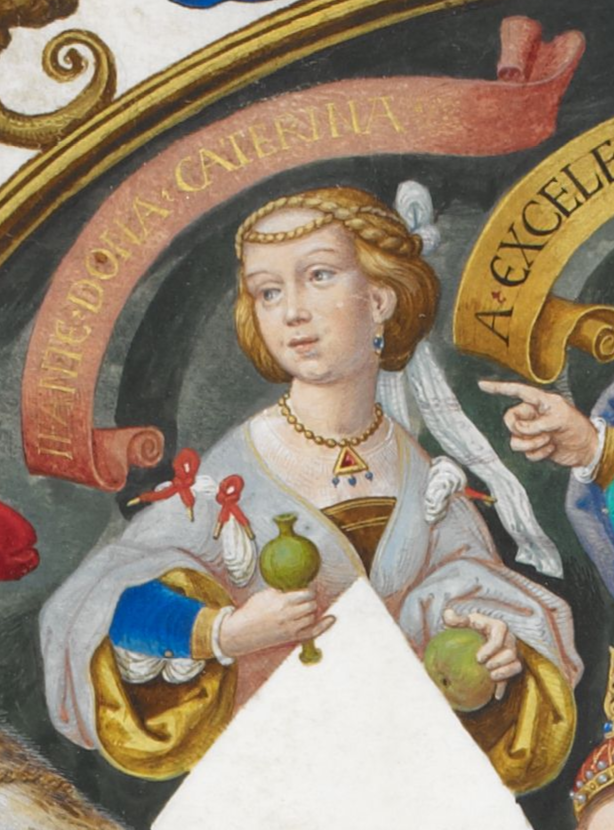
Infanta Catherine of Portugal

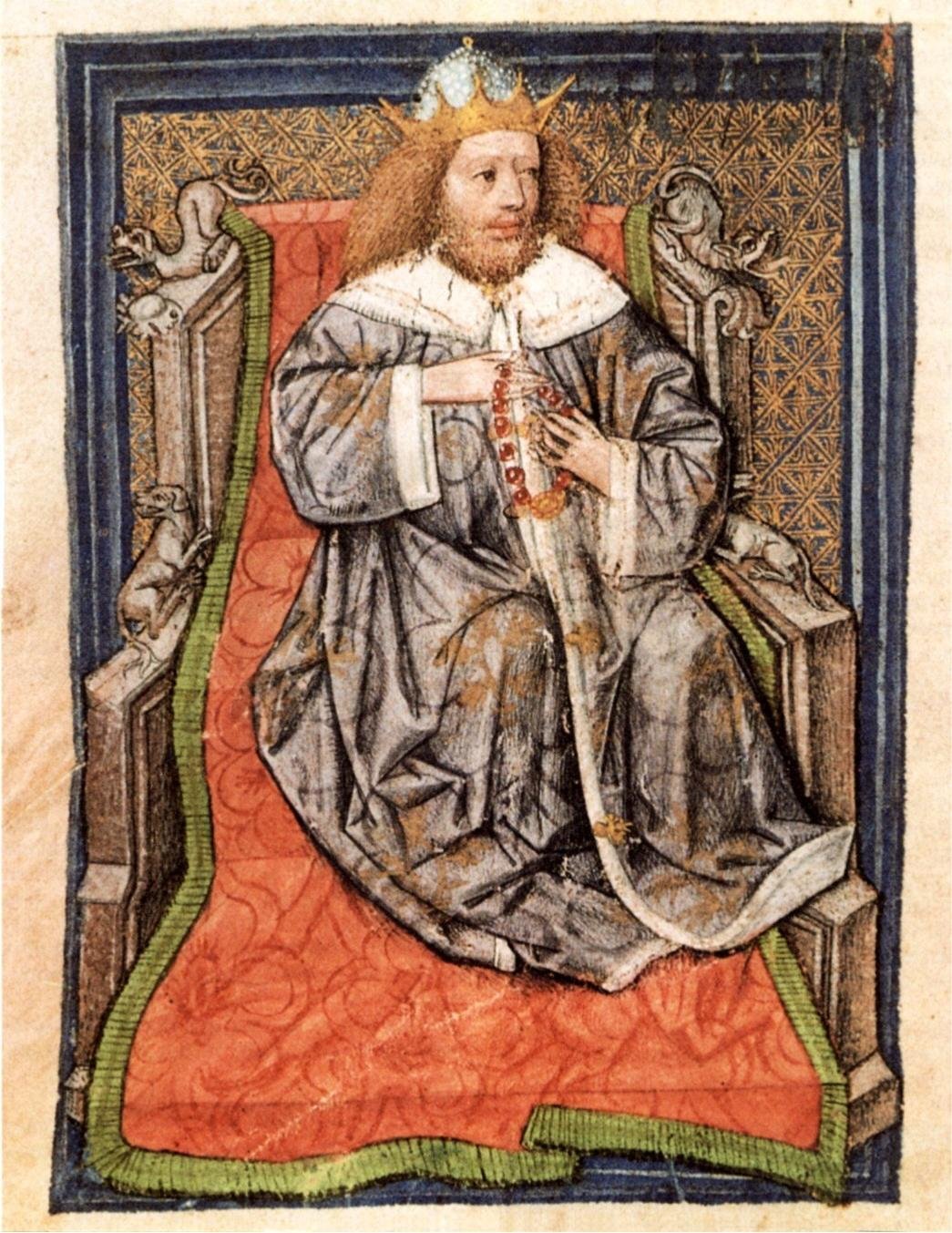
Albert VI, Archduke of Austria

- March 9 – Catherine of Bologna, Italian Roman Catholic nun and saint (b. 1413)
- May 25 – King Stephen Tomašević of Bosnia (beheaded)
- June 4 – Flavio Biondo, Italian humanist (b. 1392)
- June 17 – Infanta Catherine of Portugal, religious sister (b. 1436)
- September 23 – Giovanni di Cosimo de' Medici, Italian noble (b. 1421)
- November 1 – Emperor David of Trebizond (b. c. 1408)
- November 15 – Giovanni Antonio Del Balzo Orsini, Prince of Taranto and Constable of Naples (b. 1393)
- November 18 – John IV, Duke of Bavaria (b. 1437)
- November 29 – Marie of Anjou, queen of France, spouse of Charles VII of France (b. 1404)
- December 2 – Albert VI, Archduke of Austria (b. 1418)
- December 16 – Sir Philip Courtenay, British noble (b. 1404)
- date unknown
  - Jacob Gaón, Jewish Basque tax collector (beheaded by the mob)
  - Ponhea Yat, last king of the Khmer Empire and first king of Cambodia (b. 1394)

1464

- January – Desiderio da Settignano, Italian sculptor (b. c. 1428 or 1430)
- February 23 – Zhengtong Emperor of China (b. 1427)
- March 8 – Catherine of Poděbrady, Hungarian queen consort (b. 1449)
- May 15 – Henry Beaufort, 3rd Duke of Somerset (executed) (b. 1436)
- May 17 – Thomas de Ros, 9th Baron de Ros, English politician (executed) (b. 1427)
- May 25 – Charles I, Count of Nevers (b. 1414)
- June 18 – Rogier van der Weyden, Flemish painter (b. 1399 or 1400)
- August 1 – Cosimo de' Medici, ruler of Florence (b. 1389)
- August 11 – Nicholas of Cusa, German mathematician and astronomer (b. 1401)
- August 12 – John Capgrave, English historian and theologian (b. 1393)
- August 14 – Pope Pius II (b. 1405)
- September 7 – Otto III, Duke of Pomerania-Stettin (1460–1464) (b. 1444)
- September 23 – Bernardo Rossellino, Italian sculptor and architect (b. 1409)
- September 26 – Benedetto Accolti the Elder, Italian jurist and historian (b. 1415)
- November 16 – John, Margrave of Brandenburg-Kulmbach (b. 1406)
- November 23 – Blessed Margaret of Savoy (b. 1382 or 1390)
- December 2 – Blanche II of Navarre (b. 1424)
- date unknown – Fra Mauro, Venetian Camaldolese monk, cartographer and accountant (b. c. 1400)

1465

- January 5 – Charles I, Duke of Orléans, French poet (b. 1394)
- January 14 – Thomas Beckington, English statesman and prelate
- January 29 – Louis, Duke of Savoy (b. 1413)
- March 30 – Isabella of Clermont, queen consort of Naples (b. c. 1424)
- April 30 – Jacob of Juterbogk, German theologian (b. c. 1381)
- May 12 – Thomas Palaiologos, claimant to Byzantine throne (b. 1409)
- August 11 – Kettil Karlsson, regent of Sweden and Bishop of Linköping (plague; b. 1433)
- August 14 – Abd al-Haqq II, last Marinid Sultan of Morocco (b.1419)
- September 25 – Isabella of Bourbon, countess consort of Charolais, spouse of Charles the Bold (b. c. 1434)
- November 20 – Malatesta Novello, Italian condottiero (b. 1418)
- date unknown – John Hardyng, English chronicler (b. 1378)

1466

- February 23 – Girishawardhana Dyah Suryawikrama, 9th Maharaja of Majapahit
- March 6 – Alvise Loredan, Venetian admiral and statesman (b. 1393)
- March 8 – Francesco I Sforza, Duke of Milan (b. 1401)
- August – Hacı I Giray, first ruler of the Crimean Khanate (b. 1397)
- October 30 – Johann Fust, German printer (b. c. 1400)
- December 13 – Donatello, Italian artist (b. 1386)
- Date unknown
  - Barbara Manfredi, Italian noblewoman (b. 1444)
  - Isotta Nogarola, Italian writer and intellectual (b. 1418)
  - Nicolaus Zacharie, Italian composer (b. c. 1400)

1467

- March 13 – Vettore Cappello, Venetian statesman
- March 29 – Matthew Palaiologos Asen, Byzantine aristocrat and official
- April 20 – Dorotea Gonzaga, Italian noble (b. 1449)
- April 30 – John, Count of Angoulême (b. 1399)
- June 15 – Philip III, Duke of Burgundy (b. 1396)
- September 3 – Eleanor of Portugal, Holy Roman Empress (b. 1434)
- December 12 – Jošt of Rožmberk, Bishop of Breslau, Grand Prior of the Order of St. John (b. 1430)
- December 15 – Jöns Bengtsson Oxenstierna, archbishop and Regent of Sweden (b. 1417)
- date unknown
  - Maria of Tver, Grand Princess consort of Muscovy, spouse of Ivan III of Russia (b. 1447)
  - Peter III Aaron, prince of Moldavia
  - Jahan Shah, leader of Turkmen
  - Khan Xälil of Kazan

1468

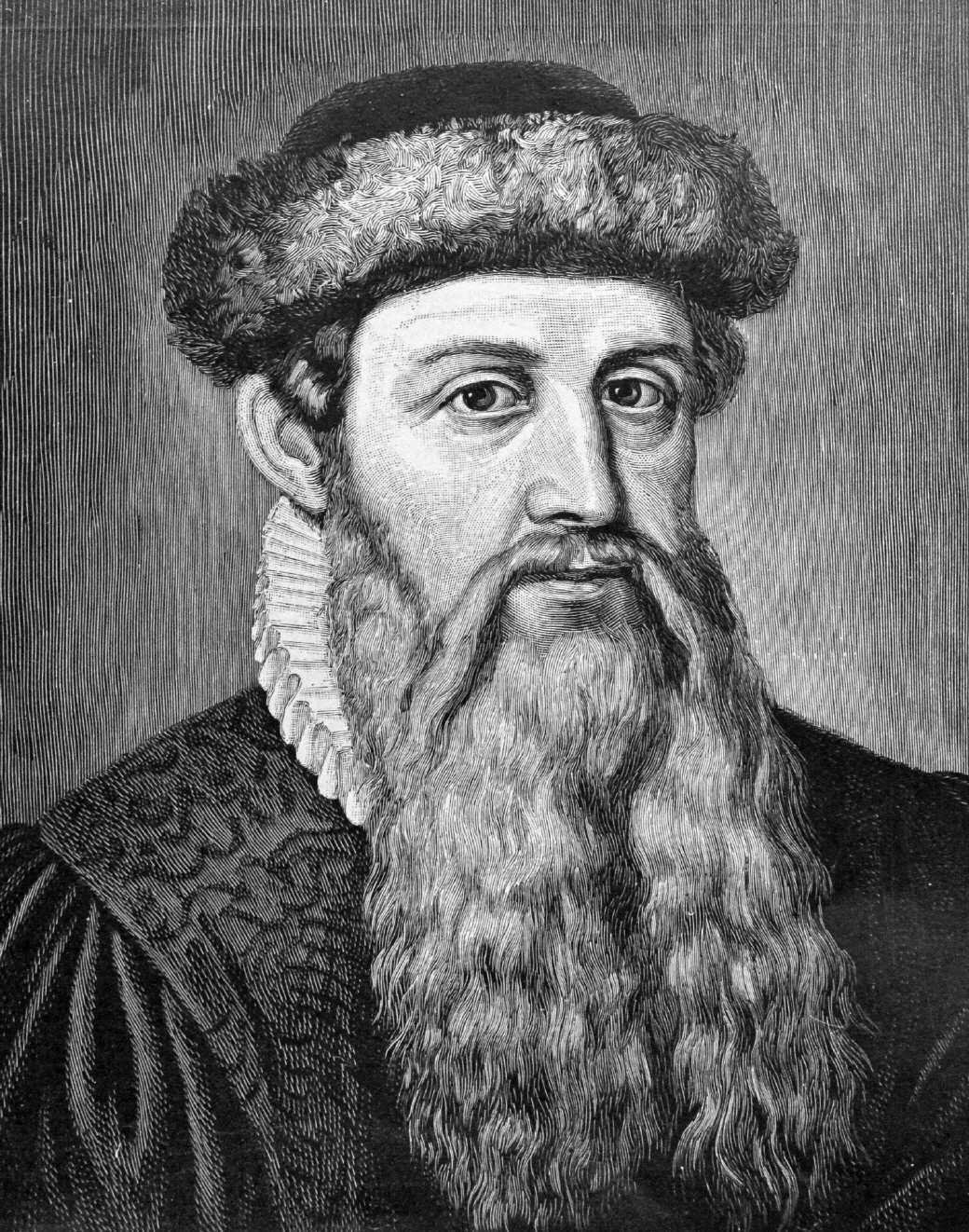
Johannes Gutenberg

- February 3 – Johannes Gutenberg, inventor of printing press with replaceable letters (b. c.1398)
- March 12 – Astorre II Manfredi, Italian noble (b. 1412)
- September 23 – Sejo of Joseon, King of Joseon (b. 1417)
- June 10 – Idris Imad al-Din, supreme leader of Tayyibi Isma'ilism, scholar and historian (b. 1392)
- June 14 – Margaret Beauchamp, countess of Shrewsbury
- June 30 – Lady Eleanor Talbot, English noblewoman
- July 5 – Alfonso, Prince of Asturias (b. 1453)
- September 26 – Juan de Torquemada, Spanish Catholic cardinal (b. 1388)
- October 7 – Sigismondo Pandolfo Malatesta, lord of Rimini (b. 1417)
- October 28 – Bianca Maria Visconti, Duchess of Milan (b. 1425)
- November 24 – Jean de Dunois, French soldier (b. 1402)
- December 6 – Zanobi Strozzi, Italian painter (b. 1412)
- date unknown
  - Joanot Martorell, Spanish writer (b. 1419)
  - Francesco Squarcione, Italian artist (b. ca. 1395)
  - Zara Yaqob, Emperor of Ethiopia (b. 1399)
  - Pomellina Fregoso, Monegaque regent (b. 1388

1469

- May 30 – Lope de Barrientos, powerful Castilian bishop and statesman (b. 1382)
- August 12 – Richard Woodville, 1st Earl Rivers (executed) (b. 1405)
- September 25 – Margaret of Brittany, Breton duchess consort (b. 1443)
- October 8/10 – Filippo Lippi, Italian artist (b. 1406)
- December 2 – Piero di Cosimo de' Medici, ruler of Florence (b. 1416)
- December 31 – King Yejong of Joseon (b. 1450)
- date unknown
  - Abu Sa'id Mirza, ruler of Persia and Afghanistan (b. 1424)
  - Niccolò Da Conti, Italian merchant and explorer (b. 1395)
  - Andrew Gray, 1st Lord Gray (b. c. 1390)
  - Moctezuma I, Aztec ruler of Tenochtitlan, son of Huitzilihuitl (b. 1390)
