= 1463 =

1463 in various calendars
- Gregorian calendar: 1463; MCDLXIII
- Ab urbe condita: 2216
- Armenian calendar: 912; ԹՎ ՋԺԲ
- Assyrian calendar: 6213
- Balinese saka calendar: 1384–1385
- Bengali calendar: 869–870
- Berber calendar: 2413
- English Regnal year: 2 Edw. 4 – 3 Edw. 4
- Buddhist calendar: 2007
- Burmese calendar: 825
- Byzantine calendar: 6971–6972
- Chinese calendar: 壬午年 (Water Horse); 4160 or 3953 — to — 癸未年 (Water Goat); 4161 or 3954
- Coptic calendar: 1179–1180
- Discordian calendar: 2629
- Ethiopian calendar: 1455–1456
- Hebrew calendar: 5223–5224
- Hindu calendars
- Vikram Samvat: 1519–1520
- Shaka Samvat: 1384–1385
- Kali Yuga: 4563–4564
- Holocene calendar: 11463
- Igbo calendar: 463–464
- Iranian calendar: 841–842
- Islamic calendar: 867–868
- Japanese calendar: Kanshō 4 (寛正４年)
- Javanese calendar: 1379–1380
- Julian calendar: 1463; MCDLXIII
- Korean calendar: 3796
- Minguo calendar: 449 before ROC 民前449年
- Nanakshahi calendar: −5
- Thai solar calendar: 2005–2006
- Tibetan calendar: ཆུ་ཕོ་རྟ་ལོ་ (male Water-Horse); 1589 or 1208 or 436 — to — ཆུ་མོ་ལུག་ལོ་ (female Water-Sheep); 1590 or 1209 or 437

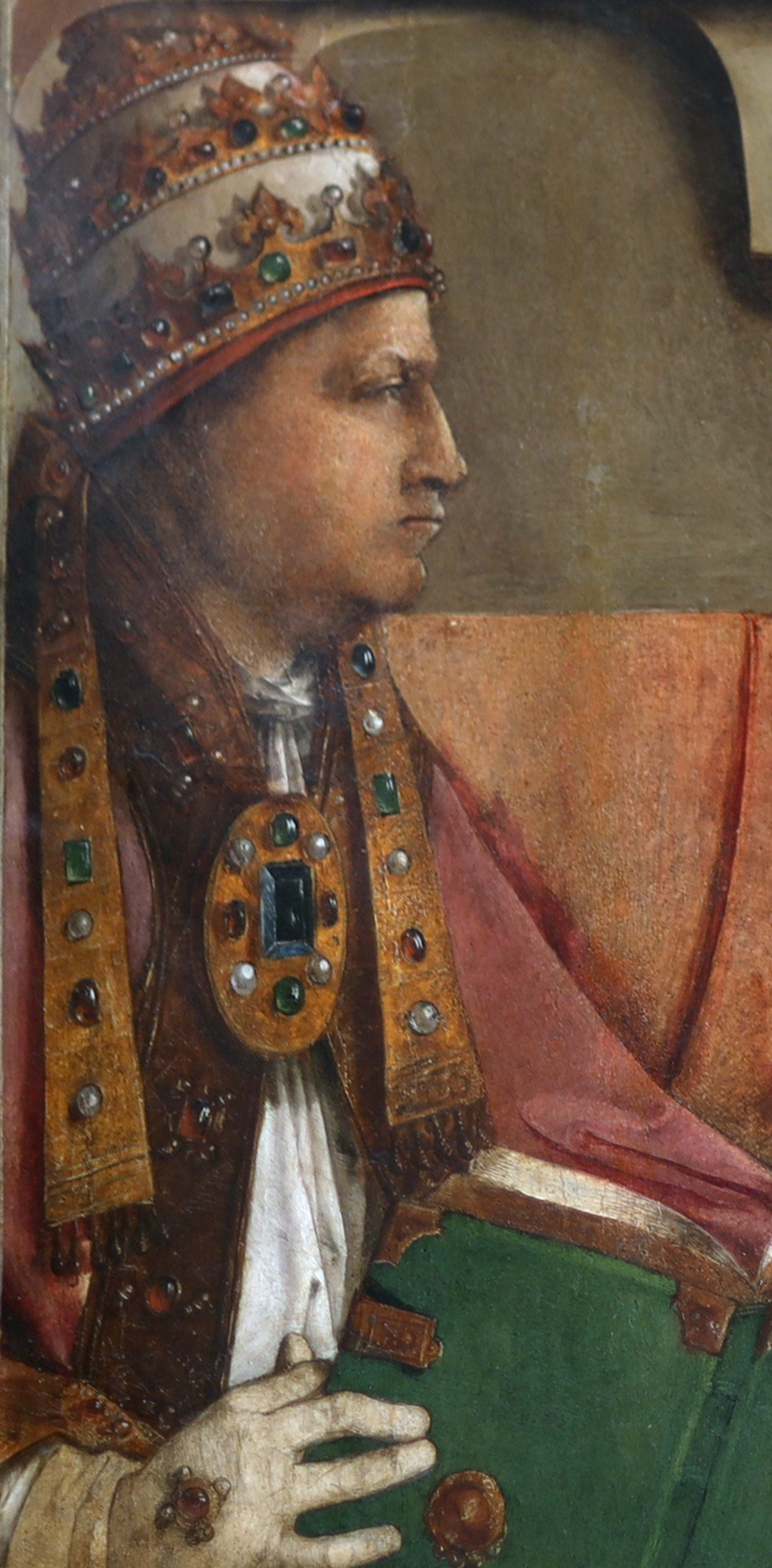
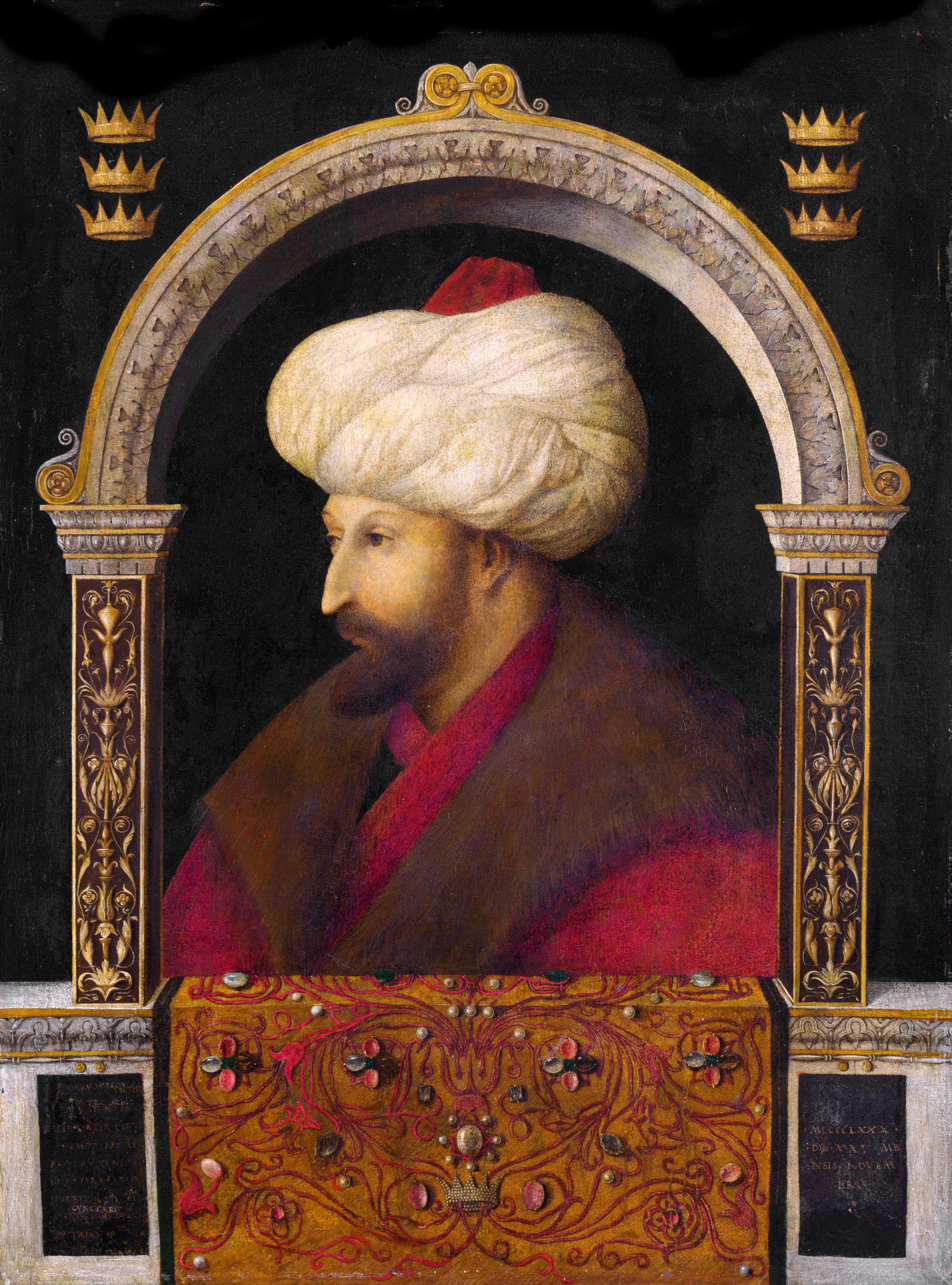
September 12: Pope Pius II calls for crusade against Sultan Mehmed II

Year 1463 (MCDLXIII) was a common year starting on Saturday of the Julian calendar, the 1463rd year of the Common Era (CE) and Anno Domini (AD) designations, the 463rd year of the 2nd millennium, the 63rd year of the 15th century, and the 4th year of the 1460s decade.

== Events ==
=== January–March ===
- January 5 – French poet François Villon receives a reprieve from death by hanging, and is banished from Paris (his further life is undocumented).
- February 6 – Otto II, Duke of Brunswick-Göttingen, a semi-independent principality within the Holy Roman Empire, dies after a reging of more than 68 years. Because Otto has no heirs, the Principality of Göttingen comes to an end and is annexed by the principality of Calenberg.
- February 22 – At the University of Cambridge in England, Henry Abyngdon becomes the first person in the world to receive a degree of Bachelor of Music
- March 10 – Henry Beaufort, 3rd Duke of Somerset receives a general pardon from King Edward IV of England after having had his lands confiscated for his support of King Henry VI in the War of the Roses. Beaufort's renewed status lasts only until the Battle of Hexham 14 months later and he is beheaded on May 15, 1464.
- March 26 – By order of Sultan Mehmed II of the Ottoman Empire, David Komnenos, the last Emperor of Trebizond, is arrested at Adrianople and put in jail along with his sons Basil, Manuel and Georgios and his nephew Alexios, on charges of conspiracy to overthrow the Ottoman imperial government.

=== April–June ===
- April 3 – The Ottoman Army under the command of Isa Bey Ishaković captures the town of Argos, located in Greece but territory of the Republic of Venice, prompting concerns that the Ottoman Empire intends to spread their conquests to the Italian peninsula.
- April 28 – Pope Pius issues the papal bull In Minoribus Agnetes, retracting his earlier complaint against the late Pope Eugene IV and endorsing the previous work at the Council of Basel.
- May 19 – Battle of Ključ (1463): Under the leadership of General Mahmud Pasha Angelović, the Ottomans begin the siege of the city of Babovac while King Stephen of Bosnia flees to the Jajce fortress.
- May 25 – The Kingdom of Bosnia falls to the Ottoman Empire as the last monarch, King Stephen Tomašević, is captured and executed by orders of the Sultan Mehmed II. According to the chronicle of Benedetto Dei, the Sultan himself carries out the beheading.
- June 18 – The free imperial city of Rottweil, part of the Holy Roman Empire and now a part of Germany, becomes an associate state of the Swiss Confederacy.

=== July–September ===
- July 19 – The Treaty of Wiener Neustadt is signed between the Kingdom of Hungary and the Holy Roman Empire.
- July 28 – The Senate of the Republic of Venice votes to declare war on the Ottoman Empire.
- July 30 – In India, Muhammad Shah III Lashkari becomes the new ruler of the Bahmani Sultanate upon the death of his older brother, the Sultan Nizam-Ud-Din Ahmad III at Bidar (now in the state of Karnataka)
- August 1 – The Importation Act 1463, given royal assent on April 29 by King Edward IV goes into effect, setting a minimum price for imported grain at 6 shillings, 8 pence per unit. The legislation had been passed to encourage the purpose of farmers raising grain in England.
- August 14 – Upon the death of his father, Mani' ibn Rabi'a al-Muraydi, Rabi'a ibn Mani' al-Muraydi becomes the new ruler of the Emirate of Diriyah at its capital, Diriyah, near Riyadh in what is now Saudi Arabia.Munir al-Ajlani, History of Saudi Arabia, Part One: The First Saudi State (in Arabic) (2nd ed.).(Riyadh, 1933) pp. 53–54. Mani's descendants in the House of Saud, most notably Mani's great-great-great-great-great-great-grandson Ibn Saud, become the founders of Saudi Arabia.
- August 20 – The Republic of Venice renews its 1448 peace treaty with Albania, pledging that any treaty between Venice and the Ottoman Empire will include a guarantee of Albanian independence. The amended treaty also guarantees the presence of Venetian Navy ships in the Adriatic Sea to protect Albania, as well as the right to asylum in Venice for Albanians.
- September 12 – Pope Pius II calls for all Christians to participate in a crusade against the Ottoman Empire.
- September 15 – Battle of Vistula Lagoon: The navy of the Prussian Confederation defeats that of the Teutonic Order.

=== October–December ===
- October 8 – The Truce of Hesdin ends French support for the House of Lancaster in England.
- October 22 – Pope Pius II issues the papal bull Ezechielis prophetae, offering an indulgence to any Christians who take part in a crusade against the Ottoman Empire for at least six months or who donate funds to support it.
- November 1 – The last emperor of Trebizond, David Megas Komnenos, is beheaded in Constantinople two years after his capture by the Ottoman Empire, by orders of the Sultan Mehmed II, in addition to his sons Basil and Manuel and his daughter Anna (who had been a concubine of the Sultan) and two other people.
- November 27 – Skanderbeg declares war on the Ottoman Empire and attacks its troops near Ohrid.
- December 1 – Mary of Guelders, Queen regent of Scotland for her 12-year-old son, King James III, dies at the age of 30, prompting the new regent, Bishop James Kennedy, to contact the former King Henry VI of England to mediate a peace between England and Scotland.

=== Date unknown ===
- Muhammad Rumfa starts to rule in Kano.
- Corpus Hermeticum is translated into Latin, by Marsilio Ficino.

== Births ==
- January 17
  - Antoine Duprat, French cardinal (d. 1535)
  - Frederick III, Elector of Saxony (d. 1525)
- February 24 – Giovanni Pico della Mirandola, Italian philosopher (d. 1494)
- June 14 – Henry IV, Duke of Brunswick-Lüneburg, German noble (d. 1514)
- August 4 – Lorenzo di Pierfrancesco de' Medici, Florentine patron of the arts (d. 1503)
- September 29 – Louis I, Count of Löwenstein and founder of the House of Löwenstein-Wertheim (d. 1523)
- October 20 or October 29 – Alessandro Achillini, Bolognese philosopher (d. 1512)
- November 29 – Andrea della Valle, Italian Catholic cardinal (d. 1534)
- December 25 – Johann of Schwarzenberg, German judge and poet (d. 1528)
- date unknown – Caterina Sforza, countess and regent of Forli (d. 1509)

== Deaths ==
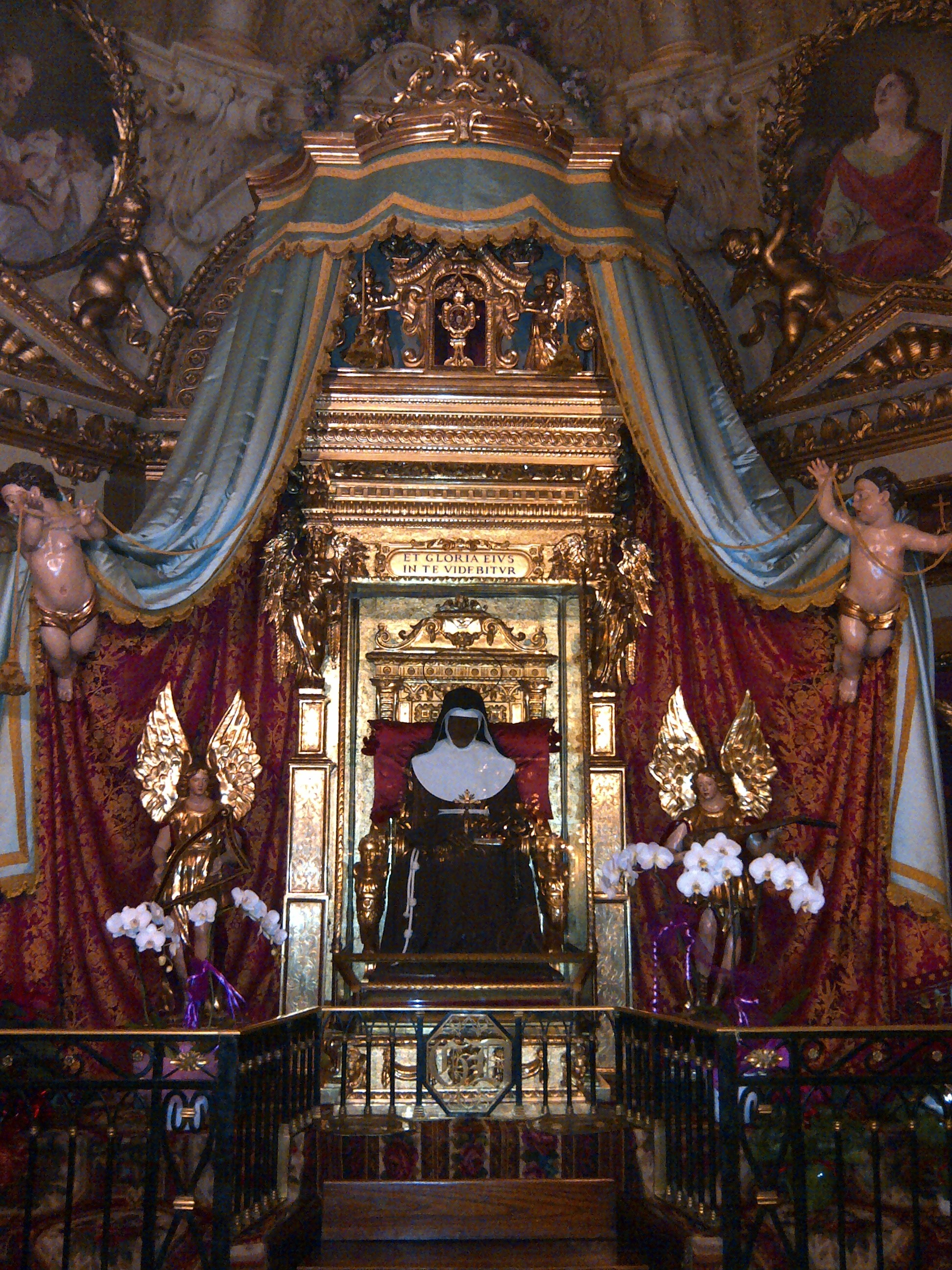
Saint Catherine of Bologna

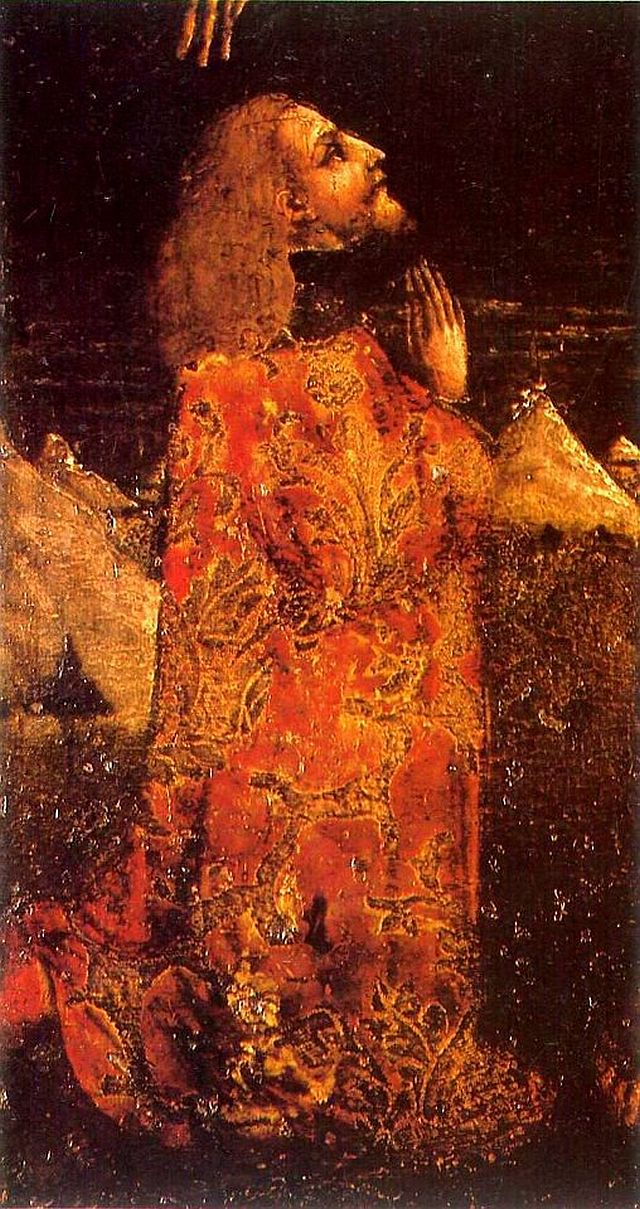
King Stephen Tomašević of Bosnia

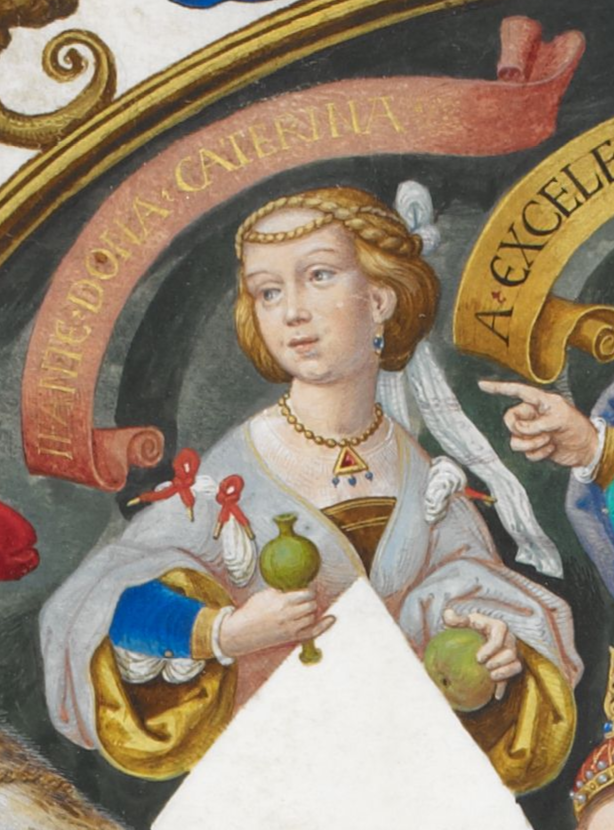
Infanta Catherine of Portugal

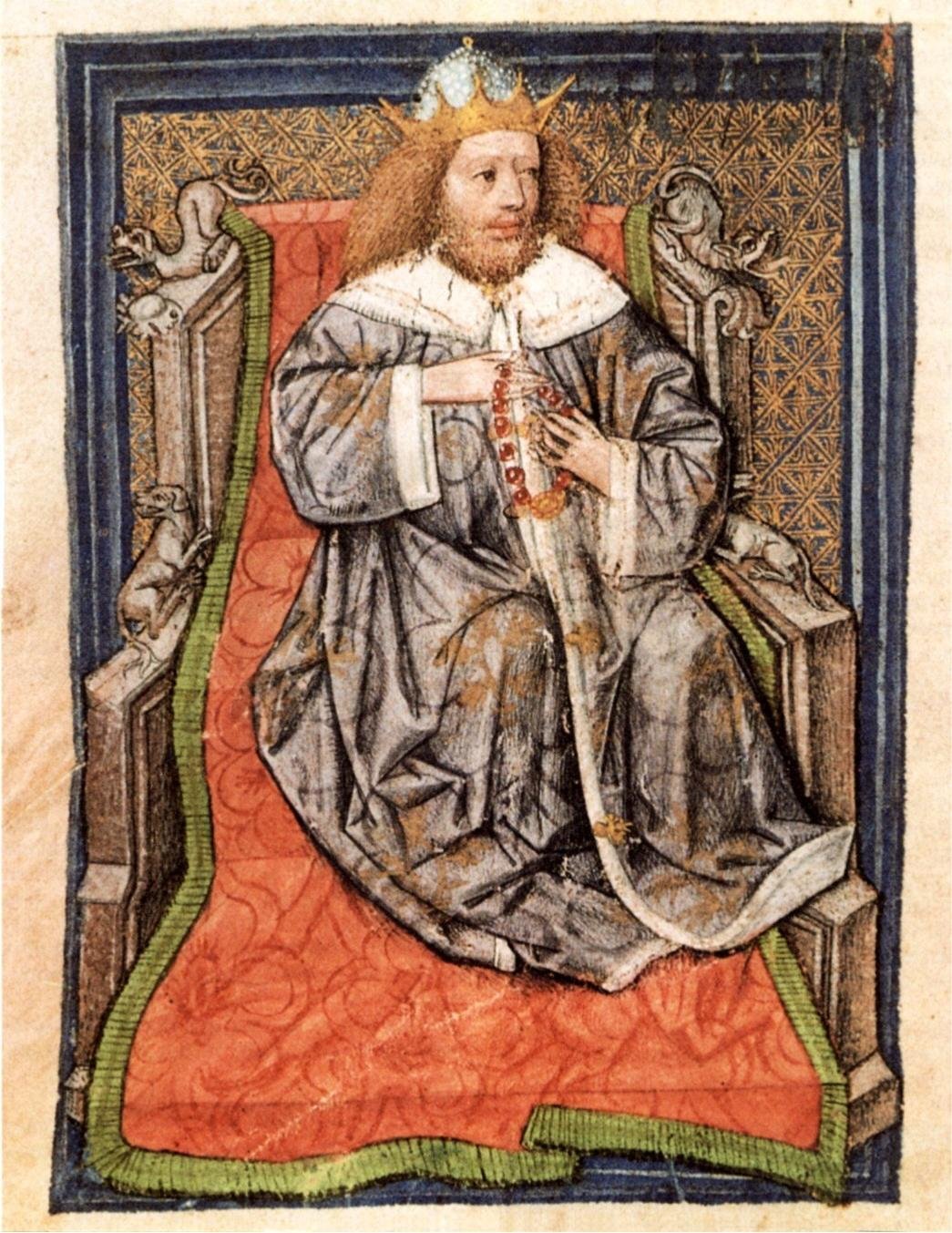
Albert VI, Archduke of Austria

- March 9 – Catherine of Bologna, Italian Roman Catholic nun and saint (b. 1413)
- May 25 – King Stephen Tomašević of Bosnia (beheaded)
- June 4 – Flavio Biondo, Italian humanist (b. 1392)
- June 17 – Infanta Catherine of Portugal, religious sister (b. 1436)
- September 23 – Giovanni di Cosimo de' Medici, Italian noble (b. 1421)
- November 1 – Emperor David of Trebizond (b. c. 1408)
- November 15 – Giovanni Antonio Del Balzo Orsini, Prince of Taranto and Constable of Naples (b. 1393)
- November 18 – John IV, Duke of Bavaria (b. 1437)
- November 29 – Marie of Anjou, queen of France, spouse of Charles VII of France (b. 1404)
- December 2 – Albert VI, Archduke of Austria (b. 1418)
- December 16 – Sir Philip Courtenay, British noble (b. 1404)
- date unknown
  - Jacob Gaón, Jewish Basque tax collector (beheaded by the mob)
  - Ponhea Yat, last king of the Khmer Empire and first king of Cambodia (b. 1394)
