= Cum almam nostram urbem =

Papal bull issued by Pope Pius II

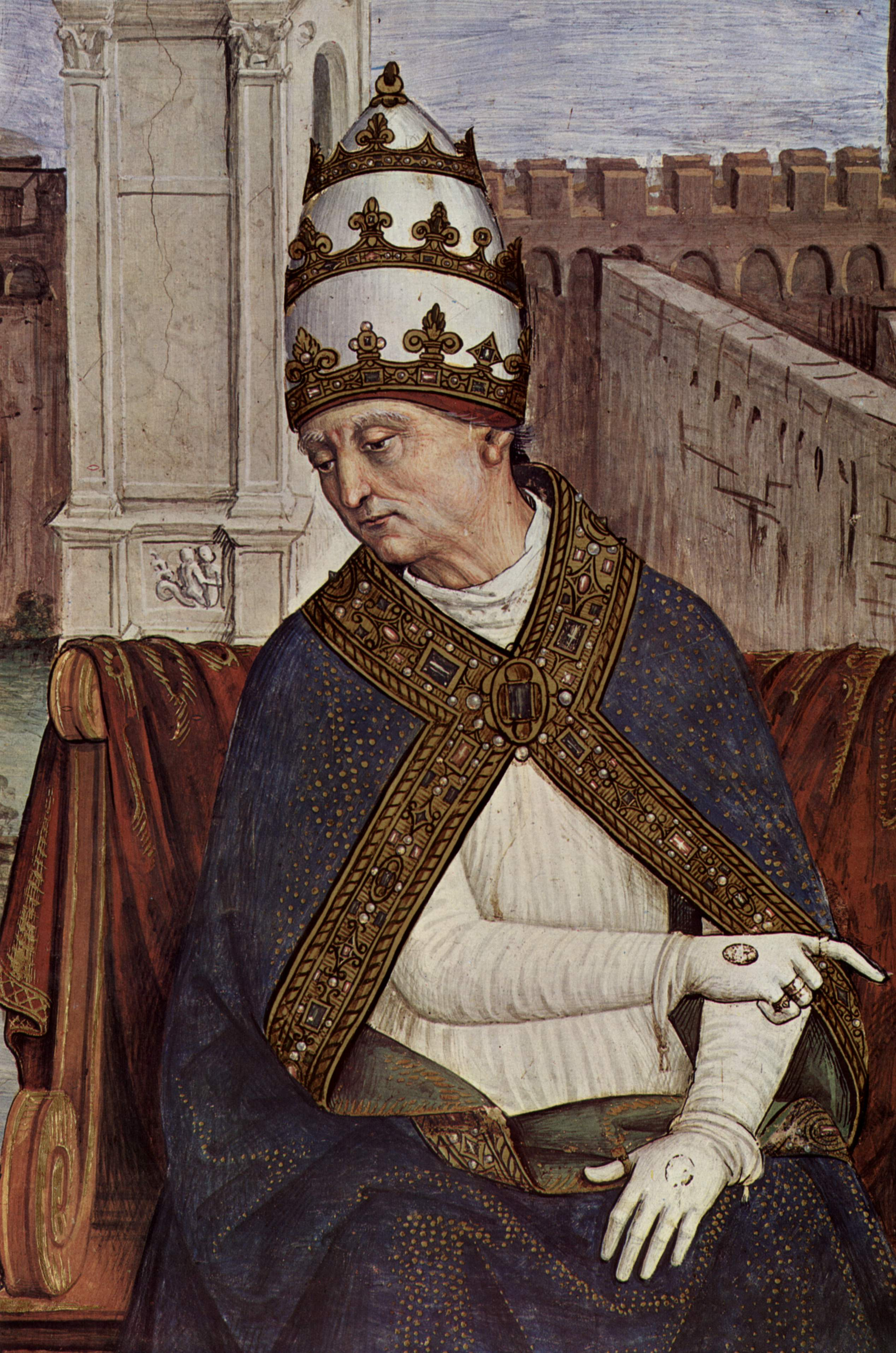
Pope Pius II

Cum almam nostram urbem is a papal bull issued by Pope Pius II on 28 April 1462 prohibiting the destruction or removal of the ancient ruins in Rome and Campagna and the burning of ancient marble for lime. Anyone who damaged the ruins would be excommunicated. The bull began:

Desirous that our venerable city be preserved in its dignity and splendor, we must attend to its care with the greatest vigilance. Not only the basilicas, churches, and religious sites, in which many relics of the saints reside, but also the ancient buildings and their ruins should be handed down to posterity, as these confer upon the city its most beautiful adornment and its greatest charm; they attest to ancient virtues and encourage us to emulate their glorious example.
