= 1404 =

1404 in various calendars
- Gregorian calendar: 1404; MCDIV
- Ab urbe condita: 2157
- Armenian calendar: 853; ԹՎ ՊԾԳ
- Assyrian calendar: 6154
- Balinese saka calendar: 1325–1326
- Bengali calendar: 810–811
- Berber calendar: 2354
- English Regnal year: 5 Hen. 4 – 6 Hen. 4
- Buddhist calendar: 1948
- Burmese calendar: 766
- Byzantine calendar: 6912–6913
- Chinese calendar: 癸未年 (Water Goat); 4101 or 3894 — to — 甲申年 (Wood Monkey); 4102 or 3895
- Coptic calendar: 1120–1121
- Discordian calendar: 2570
- Ethiopian calendar: 1396–1397
- Hebrew calendar: 5164–5165
- Hindu calendars
- Vikram Samvat: 1460–1461
- Shaka Samvat: 1325–1326
- Kali Yuga: 4504–4505
- Holocene calendar: 11404
- Igbo calendar: 404–405
- Iranian calendar: 782–783
- Islamic calendar: 806–807
- Japanese calendar: Ōei 11 (応永１１年)
- Javanese calendar: 1318–1319
- Julian calendar: 1404; MCDIV
- Korean calendar: 3737
- Minguo calendar: 508 before ROC 民前508年
- Nanakshahi calendar: −64
- Thai solar calendar: 1946–1947
- Tibetan calendar: ཆུ་མོ་ལུག་ལོ་ (female Water-Sheep); 1530 or 1149 or 377 — to — ཤིང་ཕོ་སྤྲེ་ལོ་ (male Wood-Monkey); 1531 or 1150 or 378

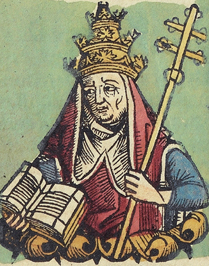
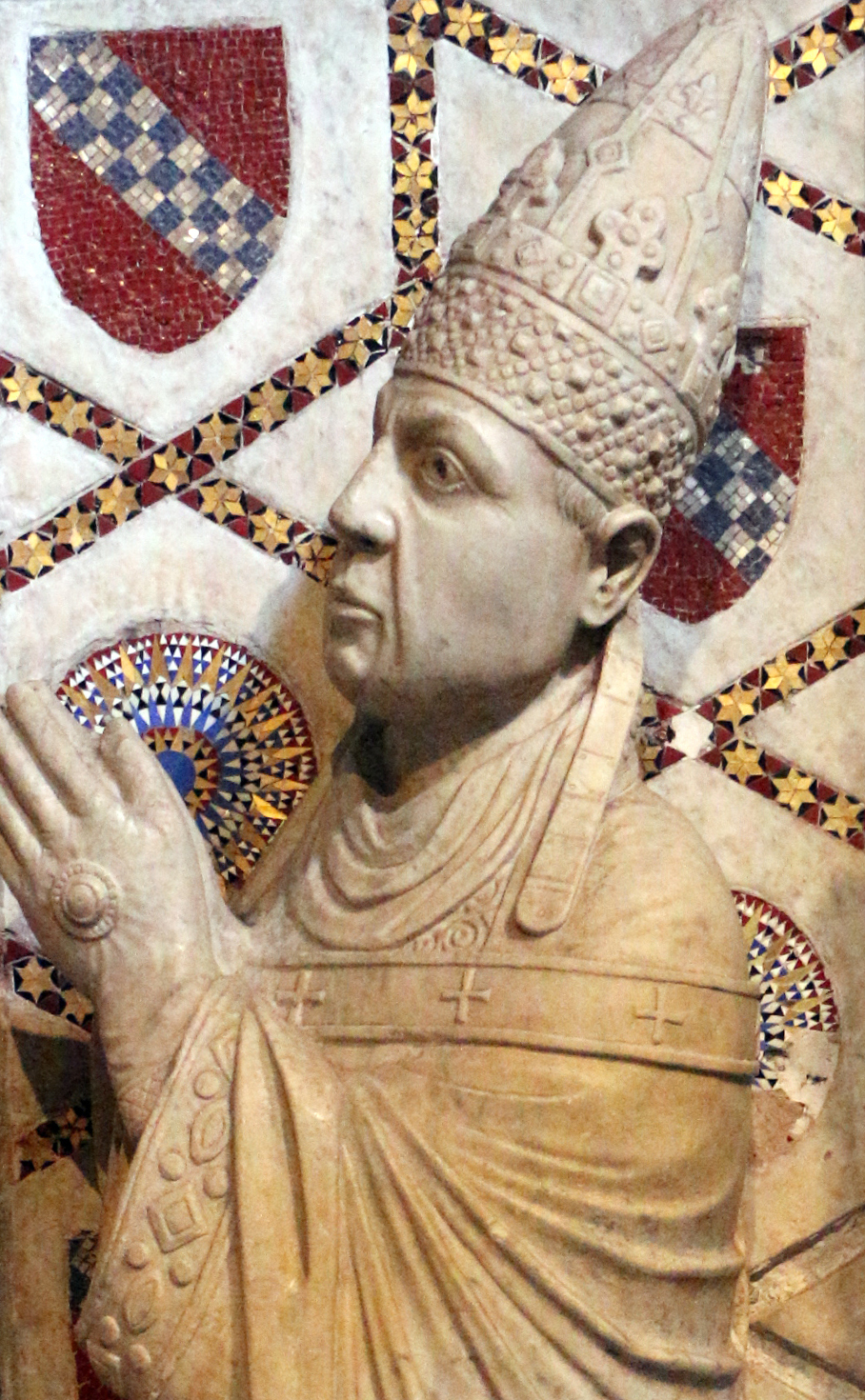
October 17: Pope Innocent VII elected to succeed the late Pope Boniface IX.

Year 1404 (MCDIV) was a leap year starting on Tuesday of the Julian calendar.

== Events ==
=== January–March ===
- January 14 – The fourth Parliament of King Henry IV of England opens for a session of two months.
- February 10 – Thomas of Lancaster, the second son of King Henry IV of England, becomes Admiral of the North and South succeeding Admiral Thomas Beaufort.
- February 27 – King Guadarfia of the Canary Islands surrenders to the French explorer Jean de Béthencourt, who declares himself to be the new king, but subservient to the sponsor of the expedition, King Enrique III of Castile (part of modern-day Spain)
- March 1 – Under the Emperor Cheng Zu, China continues to build its fleet, ordering the construction of 50 new seagoing ships from the Capital Guards in Nanjing.
- March 20 – As the English Parliament adjourns, King Henry IV gives royal assent to acts that have passed, including the Multipliers Act, which declares "It shall be felony to use the craft of multiplication of gold or silver.", prohibiting any alchemists who has actually may have discovered how to perform transmutation of other substances into precious metals. The law remains in force until repealed 284 years later.

=== April–June ===
- April 12 – Centurione II Zaccaria buys the Principality of Achaea, located on the Peloponnese peninsula in modern-day Greece, from King Ladislaus of Naples.
- April 25 – The War of Padua begins in the Veneto region of northeastern Italy as the army of the Republic of Venice, led by General Malatesta dei Sonetti, leads an attack on Padua, led by the Lord Francesco Novello da Carrara. The city of Vicenza surrenders to the Venetian troops on the same day, while the war against Padua last 19 months.
- April 27 – At Dijon, in France's Burgundian State, John the Fearless (Jean sans Peur), nephew of Charles VI of France, becomes the new Duke of Burgundy upon the death of his father, Philip the Bold.
- April or May – Battle of Blackpool Sands: Local English forces defeat an attempted raid from Saint-Malo on the port of Dartmouth, Devon; the French commander, William du Chastel, is killed.
- May 22 – The Peace of Raciążek treaty is signed by the representatives of King Władysław II Jagiełło of Poland, by the Grand Duke Vytautas of Lithuania, and by the Teutonic Knights.
- June 14 – Welsh rebel leader Owain Glyndŵr enters an alliance with the French against the English. He has begun to hold parliamentary assemblies (first on May 10 at Dolgellau).
- June 21 – The formal coronation of Owain Glyndŵr as Prince of Wales takes place at Harlech.

=== July–September ===
- July 27 – In Southern India, Bukka Raya II becomes the new ruler of the Vijayanagara Empire in what are the modern-day Indian states of Karnataka, Andhra Pradesh, Tamil Nadu and Kerala.
- September 14 – Albert IV of Austria, dies at the age of 26 from an illness contracted while he was fighting against Bohemia and Moravia for control of the city of Znaim (modern Znojmo in the Czech Republic). He is succeeded as Duke by his 6-year old son, Albert.

=== October–December ===
- October 16 – The 5th Parliament of King Henry IV of England (summoned August 25), nicknamed "The Unlearned Parliament" because Henry refuses to allow lawyers to sit, opens for a four week session in Coventry, closing on November 13.
- October 17 – Cosimo de' Migliorati, Cardinal of the Basilica Cross in Jerusalem, is elected unanimously by eight cardinals to succeed the late Pope Boniface IX. Migliorati takes the papal name Innocent VII as the 204th pope of the Roman Catholic Church.
- November 19 – The St. Elizabeth's flood of the North Sea devastates parts of Flanders, Zeeland and Holland.
- December 16 – Willem VI becomes the new Count of Holland upon the death of his father, Albrecht I, Duke of Lower Bavaria.

=== Date unknown ===
- Jean de Béthencourt becomes the first ruler of the Kingdom of the Canary Islands.
- Stephan Tvrtko II succeeds Stefan Ostoja as King of Bosnia.
- Peace is declared between Lithuania and the Teutonic Knights, after they agree to exchange land and form an alliance against Muscovy.
- A civil war, lasting two years, breaks out in the Majapahit Empire in modern-day Indonesia.
- Wallachia reaches its maximum extent under Mircea cel Bătrân.
- The University of Turin is founded.
- Timur is hit by a fever, while preparing to invade China.
- Virupaksha Raya succeeds Harihara Raya II, as ruler of the Vijayanagara Empire in modern-day southern India.
- Narayana Ramadhipati succeeds Ponthea Yat as King of Cambodia.
- Ruaidri Caech MacDermot succeeds Conchobair Óg MacDermot as King of Magh Luirg, in what later becomes northeast Connacht, Ireland.

== Births ==
- January 18 – Sir Philip Courtenay, British noble (d. 1463)
- February 8 – Constantine XI, last Byzantine Emperor (d. 1453)
- February 14 – Leon Battista Alberti, Italian painter, poet, and philosopher (d. 1472)
- March 25 (bapt.) – John Beaufort, 1st Duke of Somerset, English military leader (d. 1444)
- June – Murad II, Ottoman Sultan (d. 1451)
- July 6 – Yamana Sōzen, Japanese warlord and monk (d. 1473)
- July 25 – Philip I, Duke of Brabant (d. 1430)
- September 30 – Anne of Burgundy (d. 1432)
- October 14 – Marie of Anjou, queen of Charles VII of France (d. 1463)
- Date unknown – Eom Heung-do, local official of Joseon (d. 1474)

== Deaths ==
- April 27 – Philip the Bold, Duke of Burgundy (b. 1342)
- September 14 – Albert IV of Austria (b. 1377)
- September 27 – William of Wykeham, English bishop and statesman (b. 1320)
- October 1 – Pope Boniface IX (b. 1356)
- October 15 – Marie Valois, French princess (b. 1344)
- December 13 – Albert I of Bavaria (b. 1336)
- date unknown – Eleanor of Arborea, ruler of Sardinia (b. 1350)
