= Benedetto Dei =

Italian poet and historian

Benedetto Dei (1418–1492) was an Italian poet and historian. He spent the majority of his life in Florence, where he was an adjutant to the Medici and to the Portinari, a merchant house.

Dei's most significant work was his chronicle of Florentine art, culture, and money, The Chronicle of the Years 1400 to 1500. The book is an exhaustive classification of virtually everyone of note in the city at the time, and remains a key resource for research in Florentine history. He was also a significant member of several intellectual circles, and a number of his letters to and from prominent figures in Florence and throughout northern Italy survive.

Dei also travelled extensively, drumming up trade for the Florentine mercantile houses. Besides business trips to England, Germany, and France, Dei spent time in the Middle East and Africa; he writes in his chronicle and in letters of visits to Beirut, Jerusalem, Carthage, Sfax, Oran, and Timbuktu, among others.
