= Jacob Gaón =

Jacob Gaón (born in Vitoria, Spain, died in Tolosa, Spain, 1463) was a Jewish Basque tax collector.

The Gaóns were a Jewish family in Vitoria, Álava, today in the autonomous community of the Basque Country, Spain. In the 15th century, several of them collected taxes for the kings of Castile.

In 1463, Jacob Gaón went to the province of Gipuzkoa and reclaimed a tax called pedido to the inhabitants of the villa of Tolosa. They refused, arguing they had an exemption from paying these tributes, according to fueros and laws passed by the previous kings. Gaón menaced them, and several Tolosans killed him, cut his head off and hung it up on the top of a pillory, as a punishment for having put Tolosa up on the top of his tax collection list. When King Henry IV of Castile knew his collector had been killed, he headed to Tolosa, in order to avenge his death. The king ordered the demolition of the house in which the crime had taken place, but the killers had escaped out of town. The Guipúzcoan local authorities applied to the king, explaining the Tolosans' reasons and begging pardon for them. Eventually, Henry acknowledged that the Tolosans were exempted from this contribution and pardoned them.
