= Ezechielis prophetae =

1463 papal bull calling for a crusade

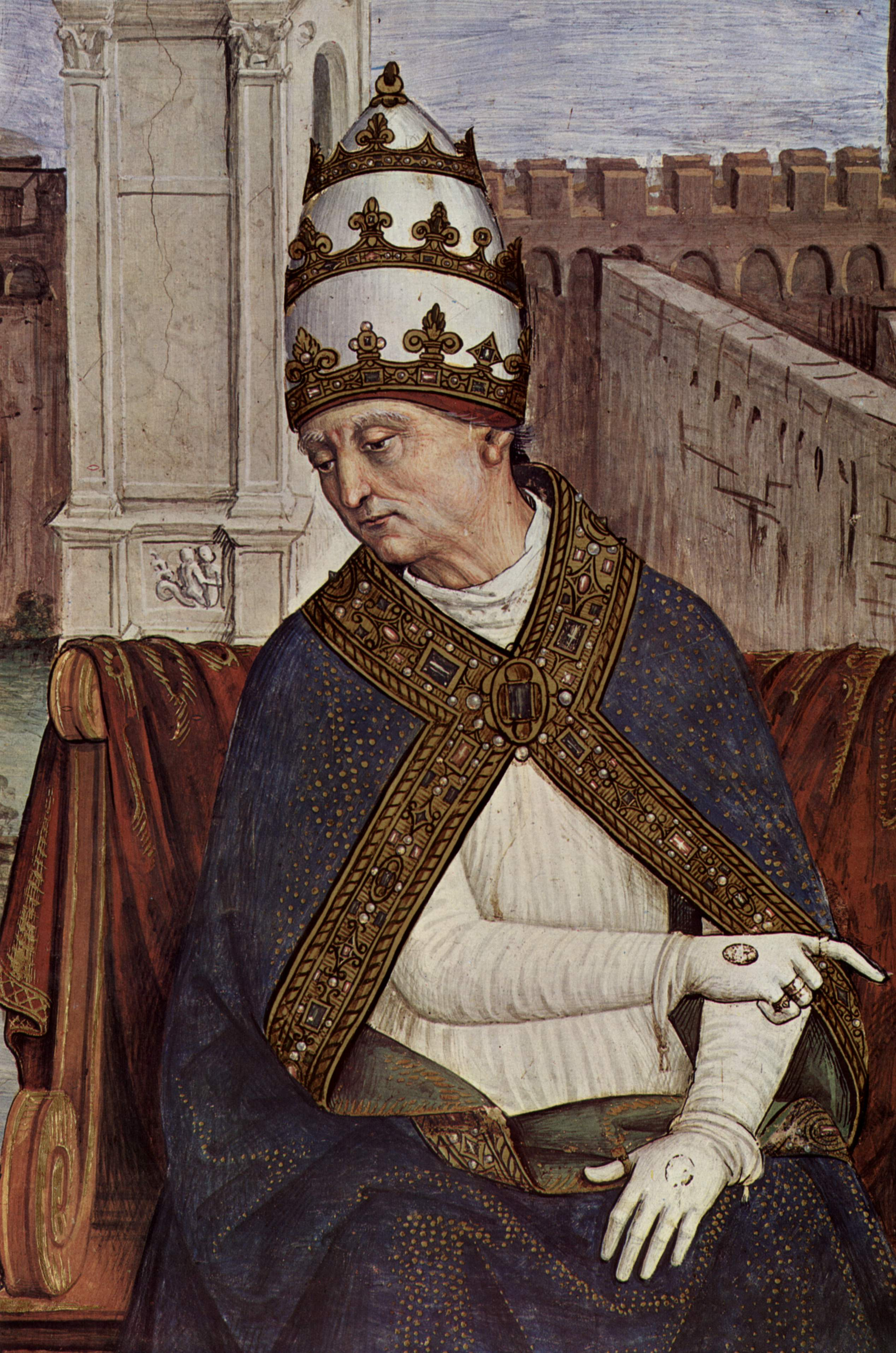
Pope Pius II

Ezechielis prophetae is a papal bull issued by Pope Pius II on 22 October 1463 calling for a crusade against the Ottoman Empire.

Pius granted a plenary indulgence to those who, for at least six months, took part in the crusade and to those who donated money towards it. Pius declared:

O stony-hearted and thankless Christians! who can hear of all these things, and yet not wish to die for Him Who died for you. Think of your hapless brethren groaning in captivity amongst the Turks, or living in daily dread of it. As you are men, let humanity prompt you to help those who have to endure every sort of humiliation. As you are Christians, obey the Gospel precept which bids you love your neighbour as yourself. Think of the miseries inflicted on the faithful by the Turks. Sons are torn from their fathers, children from their mother's arms, wives are dishonoured before the eyes of their husbands, youths are yoked to the plough like cattle.

Pius continued:

Take pity on your brethren, or, in any case, take pity on yourselves; for the like fate is hanging over you, and if you will not assist those who live between you and the enemy, those who live further away will forsake you also when your turn comes. You Germans who will not help the Hungarians, how can you expect assistance from the French—and you Frenchmen how can you count upon the aid of the Spaniards if you do nothing for the Germans? With what measure you mete the same shall be measured to you again! The ruin of the Emperors of Constantinople and Trebizond, of the Kings of Bosnia and Rascia, and other princes who have been overpowered, one after another, proves how disastrous it is to stand still and do nothing. As soon as Mahomet has subdued the East, he will quickly master the West.
