= 1410s =

Decade

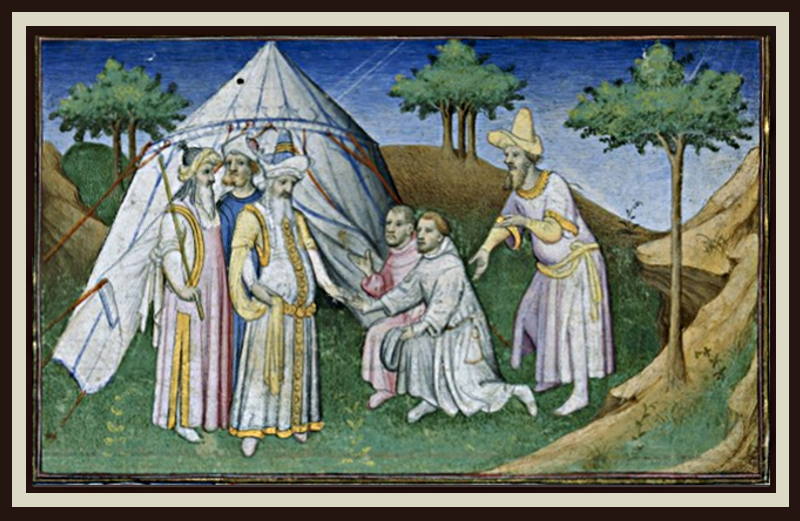

The 1410s decade ran from January 1, 1410, to December 31, 1419.

== Events ==
=== 1410 ===
==== January–March ====
- January 27 – The 8th Parliament of King Henry IV of England is opened, with Thomas Chaucer as Speaker of the House of Commons.
- January 31 – Thomas Beaufort, Duke of Exeter becomes the new Lord Chancellor of England.
- February 26 – A papal bull is issued from Avignon by the Antipope Benedict XIII for Joan Gilabert Jofré to create the Hospital dels Ignoscents, the world's first hospital for the treatment of mental illness.
- March 25 – The first of the Yongle Emperor's campaigns against the Mongols is launched by the Emperor Cheng Zu, as at least 100,000 soldiers depart from Beijing on a mission to depose Öljei Temür Khan.
- March 29 – The Aragonese capture Oristano, capital of the Giudicato di Arborea in Sardinia.

==== April–June ====
- April 15 – At the wedding in Gien of Charles, Duke of Orléans to Bonne of Armagnac, the most powerful nobles of France form the League of Gien, joining forces to fight the Duke of Burgundy, John the Fearless, beginning a civil war that will last for 30 years.
- May 9 – The English Parliament closes its session for the year, and royal assent is given by King Henry IV to various acts, including the Sealing of Cloths Act 1409 and the Unlawful Games Act.
- May 17 – At Pisa, Cardinal Baldasare Cossa is elected by members of the Council of Pisa as the successor to the "antipope" Alexander V, who had died on May 4. On May 25, Cossa takes the name "John XXIII", a name that will be used more than 500 years later in 1958 when Angelo Giuseppe Roncalli is crowned as Pope John XXIII.
- May 18 – The death of Rupert, King of the Romans, Elector of Palatine and ruler of Germany, creates a conflict over who will be the successor to the German throne. Rupert's son becomes the new Louis III, Elector Palatine as Ludwig III.
- May 19 – During his campaign against the Eastern Mongols, China's Emperor Cheng Zu stops with his troops at Minluanshu and orders the carving of an inscription on rocks at the north bank of the Kerulen river, declaring "In the eighth year of the Yongle geng yin, fourth month ding you, sixteenth day ren zi, the Emperor of the Great Ming passed here with six armies during the punitive expedition against the barbarian robbers."
- May 31 – King Martin I of Aragon (who is also King Martin II of Sicily) dies at the age of 53, leaving a question of who his successor will be, and five contenders for the thrones of both nations argue until the crown is awarded to Martin's nephew, Ferdiand, in 1412.
- June 15 –
  - At the Onon River, the Chinese Army, under the command of the Emperor Cheng Zu, annihilates the Mongol forces of the Khagan Öljei Temür Khan, also known as Bunyashiri. The Khagan escapes and the Chinese troops pursue Arughtai, chingsang of another branch of the Northern Yuan.
  - Ottoman Interregnum: Süleyman Çelebi, the Sultan of the Ottoman Empire, defeats his brother Musa Çelebi, at the Battle of Kosmidion outside of the Byzantine capital, Constantinople.

==== July–September ====
- July 11 – Ottoman Interregnum: Süleyman Çelebi defeats his brother Musa Çelebi outside the Ottoman capital, Edirne.
- July 15 – Battle of Grunwald (Žalgiris), also known as Battle of Tannenberg: Polish and Lithuanian forces under cousins Jogaila and Vytautas the Great decisively defeat the forces of the Teutonic Knights, whose power is broken.
- July 26 – The Siege of Marienburg (now Malbork in Poland), capital of the State of the Teutonic Order of the Teutonic Knights, begins with an attack by Poland and Lithuania with an army of 26,000 men against less than 5,000 Teutons.
- August 29 – The Duchy of Pomerania-Stargard is submitted by Bogislaw VIII, the Duke of Pomerania, to become a fiefdom within the Kingdom of Poland, led by King Wladyslaw II. In return, Bogislaw receives Lauenburg and Bütow Land as well as Człuchów, Biały Bór, Debrzno, Świdwin and Czarne.
- September 16 – After a siege of almost four months, the Muslim city of Antequera, located in what is now Andalusia in Spain, surrenders to the Crown of Castile and its army, commanded by Prince Ferdinand of Aragon.
- September 19 – After nearly two months of no progress against the defending Teutonic Knights, and the dissatisfaction of the Lithuanians and Poles in continuing a long-term conflict, the siege of Marienburg is lifted.
- September 20 – Following the death of Rupert, King of the Romans, on May 18, a council of three electors— Louis III, Elector Palatine; Werner von Falkenstein, Elector of Trier and Frederick I, Elector of Brandenburg, Burgrave of Nuremberg votes to elect King Sigismund of Hungary as the new King of the Romans and the informal "King of Germany". The rest of the electors of the Holy Roman Empire refuse to accept Sigismund.

==== October–December ====
- October 1 – A different set of electors— Friedrich III. von Saarwerden, Elector of Cologne; Johann II von Nassau, Elector of Mainz and Rudolf III, Elector of Saxony elects Jobst of Moravia as their choice for the King of the Romans. The conflict will remain unresolved for another four years.
- October 10 – The Polish-Lithuanian alliance defeats the Teutonic Knights in the Battle of Koronowo.
- October 10 – Euthymius II becomes the new Ecumenical Patriarch of Constantinople, leader of the Eastern Orthodox Church among Christians, after the death in August of the Patriarch Matthew I.
- November 2 – A temporary halt to the Armagnac–Burgundian Civil War in France is reached with the signing of a truce at Bicêtre, near Paris.
- December 10 – The Teutonic Council, led by the Grand Master Heinrich von Plauen, and King Jogalia of Poland and Duke of Lithuania enter into a 32-day truce.

==== Date unknown ====
- Jan Hus is excommunicated by the Archbishop of Prague.
- Construction begins on Castle Woerden in the Netherlands.
- The Prague Astronomical Clock (also known as Prague Orloj) is built by Mikuláš of Kadaň and Jan Šindel in Prague, the capital of the Czech Republic.

=== 1411 ===
==== January–March ====
- January 10 – At Anhilpur Patan in the modern-day state of Gujarat in India, Ahmad Shah I becomes the new Sultan of Gujarat upon the death of his grandfather, Muzaffar Shah I.
- January 18 – Jobst, King of the Romans and Elector of Brandenburg, a member of the House of Luxembourg who had been elected to rule as the German monarch on October 1, dies suddenly at the age of 35 following a suspected poisoning. His death clears the way for Jobst's cousin and rival, Sigismund of Hungary, to become the new King of the Romans, and for control of the Electorate of Brandenburg to pass from the House of Luxembourg to the House of Hohenzollern, with Frederick of Hohenzollern becoming the new Elector in return for supporting the election of Sigismund.
- February 1 – The First Peace of Thorn is signed at Thorn (modern-day Torun in Poland) in the Monastic State of the Teutonic Knights, ending the Polish–Lithuanian–Teutonic War. The Knights cede the region of Dobrzyń Land to the Kingdom of Poland.
- February 8 – In Spain, a parliament of representatives from Aragon, Catalonia and Valencia is opened at Calatayud to elect a successor to King Martin of Aragon, who had died eight months earlier on May 31. Although James II is nominated by the castellan of Aragon to be the new King, the parliament declines to support him or any other candidate.
- February 17 – Ottoman Interregnum: Süleyman Çelebi, Sultan of the Ottoman Empire, is strangled to death after being forced by his brother Musa Çelebi, to flee the Ottoman capital, Edirne. Rule of the Ottoman domains in Europe (Rumelia) passes to Musa.
- February 26 (2 Dhu al-Qi'dah 813 A.H.) – At 1:20 in the afternoon, Ahmad Shah I formally lays the foundation of the new city of Ahmedabad at the site of Asawal, where he had defeated the warlord Asha Bhil,) at Manek Burj.
- March 4
  - Friso-Hollandic Wars: Friesland soldiers capture the Netherlands city of Staveren, the last Netherlands stronghold in Friesland, after a bitter winter prevents ships from both sides from crossing the Zuiderzee and freezes the moat around the city walls.
  - Gujarat Sultan Ahmen Shah I declares the new city of Ahmedabad to be the new Gujarat capital.

==== April–June ====
- April 1 – Carlo I Tocco arrives at Ioannina in Greece to become the new ruler of the former Byzantine state, the Despotate of Epirus.
- April 13 – Sandalj Hranić, Duke of Bosnia, sells the Croatian coastal town of Ostrovica to the Republic of Venice, giving the Venetians further control of the Dalmatian Coast and both sides of the Adriatic Sea.
- May 19 – At the order of Louis II of Anjou, General Muzio Attendolo, leader of the Neapolitan Army, defeats the army of King Ladislaus of Naples in a battle at the Battle of Roccasecca in the Lazio region of Italy.
- June 3 – In Vienna, Friedrich IV, nicknamed "Friedrich of the Empty Pockets", becomes the new Duke of Further Austria upon the death of his older brother, Leopold the Fat.
- June 4 – The French city of Roquefort-sur-Soulzon is given exclusive rights by King Charles VI to the ripening and marketing of Roquefort cheese.

==== July–September ====
- July 6 – Ming dynasty Chinese Admiral Zheng He returns to Nanjing after his second voyage, and presents the Sinhalese king, captured during the Ming–Kotte War, to China's Emperor Cheng Zu.
- July 21 – Sigismund is formally elected unanimously as King of the Romans by the seven electors of the Holy Roman Empire present.
- July 24 – Battle of Harlaw in Scotland: Domhnall of Islay, Lord of the Isles, and an army commanded by Alexander Stewart, Earl of Mar, battle to a bloody draw.
- August 4 – Parameswara of Malacca (also identified as Bai-li-mi-su-la or Iskandar Shah), Sultan of Malacca in modern-day Malaysia, is hosted by the Ming court in China for the first of three banquets to honor his visit.
- September 3 – The Treaty of Selymbria is concluded between the Ottoman Empire and the Republic of Venice.
- September 21 – King Henry IV of England calls his ninth parliament.

==== October–December ====
- October 3 – At the Abbey of St Vaast in Arras in France, John the Fearless, Duke of Burgundy hosts English Bishop Henry Chichele and several envoys who are ready to negotiate terms for English support of Burgundy in the ongoing French civil war with the Armagnacs. The negotiations fail to attract much support other than to hire some of the English soldiers as mercentaries.
- October 22 – The Duke of Burgundy and his troops capture Paris with the help of English mercenaries.
- November 3 – The English Parliament is assembled after being summoned by King Henry IV, and again elects Thomas Chaucer as Speaker of the House of Commons.
- November 24 – The Swiss canton of Appenzell enters into an alliance with most of the cantons of the Swiss Confederacy.
- November 30 – Henry IV dismisses Prince Henry and his supporters from the government. The next day, the leader of the Armagnacs, the Duke of Orleans, finds that the gates to the walled city of Paris have been locked and are closely guarded.
- December 19 – Royal assent is given by King Henry IV to many of the acts passed by the English Parliament, including the Riot Act 1411, which provides that "The justices of peace and the sheriffs shall arrest those which commit any riot... and inquire of them, and record their offences.
- December 21 – King Henry IV of England issues pardons to all but two of the Welsh rebels in the Glyndŵr rebellion except for the leaders, Owain Glyndŵr and Thomas of Trumpington

==== Date unknown ====
- Under the reign of Emperor Cheng Zu of Ming China, work begins to reinstate the ancient Grand Canal of China, which fell into disuse and dilapidation during the previous Yuan dynasty. Between 1411 and 1415, a total of 165,000 laborers dredge the canal bed in Shandong, build new channels, embankments, and canal locks. Four large reservoirs in Shandong are also dug, in order to regulate water levels, instead of resorting to pumping water from local tables. A large dam is also constructed, to divert water from the Wen River southwest into the Grand Canal.
- Constantinople is briefly besieged by the Ottoman pretender Musa Çelebi, due to Byzantine support for Süleyman Çelebi during the Ottoman Interregnum.
- (possibly early 1412) The Battle of İnceğiz between the rival brothers Mehmed Çelebi and Musa Çelebi, during the Ottoman Interregnum.

=== 1412 ===
==== January–March ====
- January 16 – The Medici family are made official bankers of the Papacy.
- January 25 – Ernest, Duke of Austria, marries Cymburgis of Masovia.
- January 29 – The "Mining Code" (Zakon o Rudnishma) is enacted in Serbia by the Despot Stefan Lazarević to regulate the extraction of minerals.
- February 15 – The Alcañiz Concord is reached in the Spanish Aragonese city of Alcañiz to have a group of nine delegates choose an undisputed King of Aragon.
- February 27 – Battle of Morvedre: In the Spanish Kingdom of Valencia, supporters of Ferdinand of Antequera defeat those of James II, Count of Urgell.
- February 28 – The University of St Andrews in Scotland is granted a charter of privilege by the local bishop.
- March 29 – Compromise of Caspe: Nine delegates are chosen in Spain in the town of Caspe to arrive at an agreement to resolve the question of which of six relatives of the late King Martin on May 31, 1410 should be the new King of Aragon.

==== April–June ====
- April 12 – Albert V, son of the former King of Sweden, Duke Albert IV, becomes the Duke of Mecklenburg (part of modern-day Germany) upon the death of his father.
- May 7 – In Cairo, Abu’l-Faḍl Abbas Al-Musta'in, the Caliph of Cairo, is installed by rebels as the new Sultan of Egypt as a temporary replacement for his father, the Sultan An-Nasir Faraj. Al-Musta'in serves as the puppet ruler for six months before he returns to full time duty as the Caliph.
- May 16 – Gian Maria Visconti, the Duke of Milan since 1402, is assassinated in front of the church of San Gottardo in Milan by a party of Milanese Ghibellines on the orders of his terminally ill rival, Facino Cane. Visconti is stabbed in the leg and then in his head. Filippo Maria Visconti, Gian Maria's son, becomes the new Duke of Milan.
- May 18 – The Treaty of Bourges is signed between King Henry IV of England and Charles, Duke of Orléans, as the Armagnacs offer England full sovereignty over Aquitaine and Gascony in return for 4,000 troops and military aid against the Burgundians and John the Fearless.
- May 23 – An-Nasir Faraj, the Mamluk Sultan of Egypt and Syria, is stabbed to death in Damascus after surrendering to the Emirs of Syria. Nawruz al-Hafizi becomes ruler of the Syrian provinces and Faraj's son Al-Musta'in is confirmed as ruler of the Egyptian territory.
- June 14 – The Antipope John XXIII signs an agreement with King Ladislaus of Naples, paying him 75,000 florins (262.5 kg or 9,375 oz. of gold), investing Ladislaus with the Neapolitan crown, and naming him as Gonfalonier of the Church within the Papal States. In return, King Ladislaus agrees to expel Pope Benedict XII from Naples and to recognize John as the Pope of the Roman Catholic Church.
- June 24 – Compromise of Caspe: By a vote of nine delegates (three each from the Kingdom of Aragon, the Kingdom of Valencia and the Principality of Catalonia), Ferdinand of Antequera is selected as the new King of Aragon and King of Sicily, after a two year succession crisis that arose from 1410 death of King Martin.
- June 28 – As the Compromise of Carpe is read aloud by Friar Vicent Ferrer before a crowd, Ferdinand I is proclaimed as the King of Aragon by the deleagates at Caspe.

==== July–September ====
- July 24 – Behnam Hadloyo becomes Syriac Orthodox Patriarch of Mardin.
- August 14 – The Peace of Auxerre is signed between the Duchy of Burgundy and the Armagnacs, betrothing Philip, Count of Vertus, younger brother of the late Louis I, Duke of Orléans to marry Catherine of Burgundy, the daughter of John the Fearless. The marriage never takes place.
- August 24 – The Battle of Motta is fought when the Republic of Venice is forced to defend an invasion by an invading army of Hungarians, Germans and Croats. The invading force suffers a heavy defeat, losing 1,300 killed and 400 captured.
- September 3 – King Ferdinand I of Aragon is declared Count of Barcelona.

==== October–December ====
- October 5 – (29th day of 8th month Ōei 19) Emperor Go-Komatsu abdicates, and Emperor Shoko accedes to the throne of Japan.
- October 28 – Eric of Pomerania becomes sole ruler of the Kalmar Union (Sweden, Denmark and Norway) on the death of Queen Margaret.
- November 6 – The rebel Emir Al-Mu'ayyad Shaykh becomes the new Mamluk Sultan of Egypt by forcing the reigning Sultan Al-Musta'in to abdicate. Shaykh allows Al-Musta'in to continue as Caliph of Cairo.
- November 8 (5th waxing of Nadaw 774 ME) – Ava–Hanthawaddy War: In modern-day Myanmar, King Razadarit of Hanthawaddy leads the invasion of the city of Prome with 4,000 troops.
- December 1 – King Henry IV of England issues a summons of the English Parliament for his final time, directing the members of Commons and the House of Lords to assemble on February 3.
- December 18 – China's Emperor Cheng Zu orders the fourth of the Ming treasure voyages, to be led by Admiral Zheng He.
- December – Battle of Chalagan: The Kara Koyunlu Turkomans defeat the Georgians under Constantine I of Georgia, and their ally Ibrahim I of Shirvan.

==== Date unknown ====
- The first mention is made of Wallachian knights competing in a jousting tournament, in Buda.
- John II of Castile declares the Valladolid laws, that restrict the social rights of Jews. Among many other restrictions, the laws force Jews to wear distinctive clothes, and deny them administrative positions.
- Years after its publication in the 14th century, the Ming dynasty Chinese artillery officer Jiao Yu adds the preface to his classic book on gunpowder warfare, the Huolongjing.
- The Black Death sweeps England for a final time, in a 60-year period.

=== 1413 ===
==== January–March ====
- January 30 – The First Scutari War between the Kingdom of Zeta (now part of Albania and Montenegro) and the Venetian Republic comes to an end.
- February 3 – The 10th and final English Parliament of King Henry IV opens its session, but closes abruptly after six weeks because of the death of the King.
- March 20 – King Henry IV of England dies at Westminster Abbey, where the English Parliament has been meeting, and passes on while in the Jerusalem Chamber of the house of the Abbot, William de Colchester.
- March 21 – Henry, Prince of Wales becomes King Henry V of England the day after the death of his father Henry IV.
- March 22 – King Henry V summons the English Parliament to meet at Westminster beginning on May 14.
- March 27 – The Republic of Genoa regains its independence after having been a territory of the Kingdom of France since 1396, and Giorgio Adorno is elected as the Doge for life. He will die after slightly less than two years in office.
- March 31 – Trung Quang De, Emperor of Vietnam (at the time Dai Viet, surrenders the Kingdom to the control of China. The Chinese occupying force installs Tran Cao as the figurehead king.

==== April–June ====
- April 9 – The coronation of Henry V as King of England takes place at Westminster Abbey.
- April 27 – The Cabochien revolt begins in Paris as a group of people, led by Simon Caboche, seize the Bastille prison and take as a hostage the Provost of Paris, Pierre des Essarts. The Cabochiens will control the city for the next four months.
- May 14 – The first Parliament of King Henry V assembles at Westminster.
- May 22 – During the confusion of the Cabochien revolt, King Charles VI of France signs into law the “Ordonnance cabochienne" that limits his power.
- May 31 – At Srinagar, Ali Shah Miri becomes the new Sultan of Kashmir in what is now India, succeeding upon the death of his father, the Sultan Sikandar Shah Miri.
- June 8 – King Ladislaus of Naples and his troops conquer and sack the city of Rome and drive out the Antipope John XXIII.
- June 9 – Parliament closes in England as royal assent is given by King Henry V to acts passed during the session, including the Corn Measure Act 1413 and the Parliamentary Elections Act 1413 that sets regulations for the qualification of men to be elected to the House of Commons.
- June 10 – Ludwig becomes the new monarch of the German principality of Hesse upon the death of his father, Hermann II, Landgrave of Hesse.

==== July–September ====
- July 5 – Battle of Çamurlu: Mehmed I defeats his brother Musa, ending the Ottoman Interregnum.
- August 3 – The Cabochien revolt comes to an end as the citizenry and nobles of Paris rise up against rebel control. The Cabochiens who fail to flee the city are executed, although Simon Caboche and the Duke of Burgundy escape.
- August 28 – The University of St Andrews in Scotland is chartered by papal bull.
- September 5 – The "Ordonnance cabochienne" is repealed by the French government and King Charles's powers are restored.

==== October–December ====
- October 2 – The Kingdom of Poland and Grand Duchy of Lithuania sign the Union of Horodło.
- October 12 – Tewodros I ascends the throne as Emperor of Ethiopia following the death of his father Dawit I
- November 19 – The alliance between the Margraviate of Brandenburg and the Duchy of Pomerania-Wolgast against the Duchy of Pomerania-Stettin is renewed.
- December 1 – King Henry V of England summons the English Parliament to assemble on April 30 at Westminster.
- December 4 – By order of King Henry V of England, the remains of King Richard II (whom Henry V's father had overthrown and imprisoned in 1399) are moved from the grounds of King's Langley Priory in Hertfordshire and reinterred at Westminster Abbey, the traditional final resting place of English monarchs.
- December 18 – The betrothal ceremony of Prince Charles of France (age 10), son of King Charles VI, to Marie of Anjou (age 9), daughter of Louis, Duke of Anjou, takes place at the Palais du Louvre in Paris. The two will marry in 1422.
- December 26 – The rule of Michele Steno as the Doge of the Republic of Venice ends after 26 years upon his death. Tommaso Mocenigo is elected to replace him as Doge.

==== Date unknown ====
- Samogitia becomes the last region in Europe to be Christianized.
- The Annals of the Joseon Dynasty begin in Korea.

=== 1414 ===
==== January–March ====
- January 7 – Michael Küchmeister von Sternberg becomes the 28th Grand Master of the Teutonic Order, succeeding Heinrich von Plauen.
- January 9 – The Oldcastle Revolt, led by John Oldcastle as an uprising by the Lollards in England against King Henry V, begins at St. Giles' Fields. King Henry's troops, stationed at Clerkenwell Priory in London, halt the rebellion the next day and capture 80 rebels who are later convicted of and executed for treason.
- February 11 – The coronation of Ferdinand I as King of Aragon takes place at Zaragoza.
- February 26 – The speech given by French theologian Jean Petit of the "Council of Faith", including nine propositions drawn from the speech, is publicly burned by order of the inquisitor, Gerard de Montaigu, the Roman Catholic Bishop of Paris.
- March 9 – Abu’l-Faḍl Abbas Al-Musta'in, previously forced to abdicate as Sultan of Egypt and replaced by Al-Mu'ayyad Shaykh on November 6, 1412, is forced out from his office as Caliph of Cairo. The Sultan Shaykh then designates his own brother, Sulaymān al-Mustakfī, as the new Caliph of Cairo.
- March 30 – The rebellion by Vietnamese Emperor Tran Quy Khoang against the Ming dynasty Chinese occupying armies comes to an end when Tran is captured and imprisoned by General Zhang Fu, marking a turning point in the Ming–Việt War.

==== April–June ====
- April 6 – China's Emperor Cheng Zu departs from Beijing to lead a military campaign against the Oirat Mongols.
- April 30 – The second English Parliament of King Henry V opens at Westminster and Walter Hungerford is elected as Speaker of the House of Commons.
- May 28 – Khizr Khan, Timur's governor of Multan in India, conquers the Delhi Sultanate from Daulat Khan Lodi, founding the Sayyid Dynasty.
- May 29 – The English Parliament closes its session after 29 days, and King Henry V gives royal assent to numerous laws.
- June 23 – Yeshaq I, succeeds his brother Tewodros I as Emperor of Ethiopia

==== July–September ====
- July 21 – Iskandar Mirza, who had ruled the Timurid Empire since 1409, is captured as the city of Isfahan surrenders to Shah Rukh.
- August 6 – Joanna II becomes the reigning Queen of Naples upon the death of her brother, King Ladislaus.
- August 29 – The brotherhood of the "Sancta dels Folls Dona Nostra i Desamparats Innocents" (Our Lady of the Insane and the Forsaken Innocents) is founded in Valencia to help the mentally ill, but soon extends its mission to take care of homeless and abandoned children.
- September 20 – A giraffe is presented to China's Emperor Cheng Zu as a gift from the Sultan of Bengal, Saifuddin Hamza Shah.

==== October–December ====
- October 8 – Bohemian church reformer Jan Hus departs his home at the invitation of King Sigismund of Germany in order to attend the Council of Constance. A few weeks after his November 3 arrival, however, he is imprisoned and spends the rest of his life in captivity.
- November 8 – The coronation of Sigismund of Luxembourg as King of the Romans takes place at Aachen, four years after he had been elected.
- November 16 – The Council of Constance opens at Konstanz begins in order to end the western schism and resolve the conflict of having three different Popes recognized by Rome (Benedict XIII), Avignon (Gregory XII) and Avignon (John XXIII), after being summoned by King Sigismund.
- November 19 – The Third Parliament of King Henry V of England opens at Westminster and passes numerous laws, including the Suppression of Heresy Act 1414, the Riot Act 1414, and the Safe Conducts Act 1414.
- December 17 – (4 Shawwal 817 AH) In Ahmedabad in the Gujarat Sultanate in India, construction of Ahmed Shah's Mosque is completed and the date is etched into stone.
- December 19 – In Poland, Casimir, Duke of Oświęcim takes full power as he reaches the age of 18.

==== Date unknown ====
- Ernest, Duke of Austria (head of the Leopoldian line of the House of Habsburg) is the last duke to be enthroned in the Duchy of Carinthia, according to the ancient Carantanian ritual of installing dukes at the Prince's Stone; he adopts the title of Archduke.
- Alien priory cells are suppressed in England.
- The Tibetan lama Je Tsongkhapa, of the Gelug school of Buddhism, declines the offer of the Emperor Cheng Zu of China to appear in the capital at Nanjing, although he sends his disciple Chosrje Shākya Yeshes, who is given the title "State Teacher". The later Xuande Emperor will grant Yeshes the title of a king, upon a return visit to China (to the new capital at Beijing).
- Durham School is founded as a grammar school in the city of Durham, England by Thomas Langley, Prince-Bishop of Durham; it continues in existence as an independent school 600 years later.

=== 1415 ===
==== January–March ====
- January 24 – France and England agree to extend their truce in the ongoing Burgundian War after the English Bishop of Durham and of Norwich meet with representatives of King Charles VI, prolonging a ceasefire until May 1.
- January 30 – (19th day of 12th month Ōei 21) Shoko is formally enthroned as the new Emperor of Japan, more than two years after the abdication of his father, the Emperor Go-Komatsu.
- February 22 –
  - Forty Years' War: (Full moon of Tabaung 776 ME) In what is now Myanmar, Razadarit, ruler of the Hanthawaddy kingdom, authorizes a plan to fight the forces of Minkhaung I ruler of the Ava Kingdom. King Razadarit leads the invasion on March 2 (8th waning of Tabaung 776 ME).
  - King Charles VI of France and John the Fearless, Duke of Burgundy, sign the Treaty of Arras.
- March 2 – At the Council of Constance, the Antipope John XXIII, chosen at the Council of Pisa, promises that he will resign all claims to leadership of the Roman Catholic Church.
- March 13 – (4th waxing of Tagu 776 ME) At the decisive Battle of Dala in Myanmar, Crown Prince Minye Kyawswa of Ava leads his troops in the battle against the army of King Razdarit of Hanthawaddy. Prince Kyawswa is killed, but King Minkhaung's troops defeat the Hanthawaddy invaders and force their retreat.Yazawin Thit The loss for King Razdarit comes despite the advice of his astrologers for the date of the attack.
- March 20 – Despite his promise to resign, the Antipope John XXIII escapes the city of Constance and takes refuge in the Duchy of Austria at Schaffhausen.
- March 23 – Giorgio Adorno resigns as the Doge of Genoa despite having been appointed for life.
- March 29 – Barnaba Guano is elected as the new Doge of the Republic of Genoa.

==== April–June ====
- April 6 – The decree Haec sancta synodus is approved by the Council of Constance and sets the precedent that an ecumenical council of cardinals and bishops has superiority over the Pope. The decree provides that a council "legitimately assembled in the Holy Spirit... has power immediately from Christ; and that everyone of whatever state or dignity, even papal (in the Latin text,etiam si papalis), is bound to obey it in those matters which pertain to the faith."
- April 30 – Frederick I becomes Elector of Brandenburg.
- May 4 – The Council of Constance declares that the late English theologian John Wycliffe (1328-1384) was a heretic and bans his writings, as well as directing that his work be burned, and that Wycliffe's remains be removed from their burial site on consecrated church ground. The order will be carried out 13 years later in 1428.
- May 11 – From Valencia in Spain, the Antipope Benedict XIII issues a papal bull with eleven prohibitions against Jews, including a ban on teaching, reading or possessing the Talmud; prohibition of Jewish possession of Christian artifacts or Christian books; limiting each town to only one synagogue; barring Jews from serving specific jobs or making contracts; segregating Jews from Christians in all public places; and requiring all Jews to wear "a red and yellow sign" on their clothes. Jews who convert to the Roman Catholic faith become exempt from the restrictions
- May 29 – The Council of Constance approves an order dismissing, in absentia the Antipope John XXIII, who had been chosen by the Council of Pisa, from any authority over the Roman Catholic Church.
- June 5 – The Council of Constance condemns the writings of John Wycliffe and asks Jan Hus to recant in public his heresy; after his denial, he is tried for heresy, excommunicated, then sentenced to be burned at the stake.

==== July–September ====
- July 4 – Pope Gregory XII officially opens the Council of Constance, and then abdicates. He is the last pope to resign, until Pope Benedict XVI in 2013.
- July 6 – Jan Hus is burned at the stake in Konstanz.
- July 18 – Sigismund, King of the Romans, departs from the meeting of the Council of Constance on a special trip to Perpignan, in order to secure the resignation of the antipope Benedict XIII in order to end the Western Schism, and then to try to end the wars between France and England, and Poland and the Teutonic Knights.
- July 31 – Henry V of England is informed of the Southampton Plot against him; he has the leaders arrested and executed, before invading France.
- August 21 – Conquest of Ceuta: Portugal conquers the city of Ceuta from the Moors, initiating the Portuguese Empire, and European expansion and colonialism.
- September 20 – Sigismund, King of the Germans, who convened the Council of Constance, meets in Spain with the antipope Benedict XIII, and makes an unsuccessful attempt to persuade Benedict to resign.

==== October–December ====
- October 25 – Battle of Agincourt: Archers, led by Henry V of England are instrumental in defeating a larger army of French knights. Edward, 2nd Duke of York, the son of King Henry, is killed in the battle, along with the French commander, Charles I d'Albret, Constable of Paris, and the second-in-command, John I, Duke of Alençon.
- November 4 – The English Parliament is opened by King Henry V for an 8-day session.
- November 5 – In an attempt to resolve the Brandenburg–Pomeranian conflict in Germany, Frederick I, Elector of Brandenburg pledges his 3-year-old daughter, Magadalene for a future marriage to Wartislaw IX, the 15-year-old Duke of Pomerania-Wolgast. Magdalene and Wartislaw marry other people after they grow up.
- November 12 – The English Parliament is closed after accomplishing the passage of the Money Act 1415, upgrading the penalty for importing or offering in payment "any sort of money forbidden by former statutes" to a felony.
- December 16 – The Treaty of Eberswalde is signed between Pomerania-Stettin (ruled by Otto II and Casimir V) and Brandenburg (ruled by the Elector Frederick I), temporarily ending the Uckermark War between the two duchies. In return for payment by Brandenburg, Pomerania-Stettin gives up Uckermark, Boitzenburg and Zehdenick.
- December 18 – Jean de Touraine becomes the new Dauphin of France, heir to the throne, upon the death of his older brother Louis, Duke of Guyenne. Jean dies on April 5, 1417, five years before the death of his father, King Charles VI of France.

==== Date unknown ====
- Avignon Pope Benedict XIII orders all Talmuds to be delivered to the diocese, and held until further notice.
- The Swiss Confederation takes the territory of Aargau from the house of Habsburg.
- The Grand Canal of China is reinstated by this year after it had fallen out of use; restoration began in 1411, and was a response by the Emperor Cheng Zu of the Ming Dynasty to improve the grain shipment system of tribute traveling from south to north, towards his new capital at Beijing. With this action, the food supply crisis is solved by the end of the year.

=== 1416 ===
==== January–March ====
- January 21 – King Henry V summons the English Parliament to meet on March 16.
- January 27 – The Republic of Ragusa is the first state in Europe to outlaw slavery.
- February 9 – Sigismund, King of Germany, creates the independent Duchy of Savoy with Count Amadeus the Peaceful becoming the first Duke of Savoy and taking the regnal title Amadeus VIII.
- March 1 – Sigismund arrives in Paris to reach an agreement with the Franch government, but is unable to because of difficulty in reaching a conclusion satisfactory to both its Orleanist and Burgundian factions.
- March 11 – Hundred Years' War, Lancastrian phase: The Battle of Valmont takes place in the neighboring towns of Valmont and Harfleur, as Thomas Beaufort, Duke of Exeter and his English Army troops inflict heavy casualties on a larger group of French soldiers commanded by Bernard VII, Count of Armagnac.
- March 16 – The Treason Act 1415 takes effect in England, making coin clipping a treasonable offense.

==== April–June ====
- April 2 – Alfonso V becomes the new King of Aragon and the new King of Sicily upon the death of his father, King Ferdinand I of Aragon.
- May 3 – Unable to reach an agreement with France, King Sigismund of Germany travels to London, where he is welcomed by King Henry V of England.
- May 27 – Total solar eclipse.
- May 29 – At the Battle of Gallipoli, Venetian admiral Pietro Loredan destroys the Ottoman fleet.
- May 30 – The Catholic Church burns Jerome of Prague for heresy at the Council of Constance.
- June 2 – The Truce of Harfleur between England and France comes to an end after 27 days, and a French siege of Harfleur begins again on June 5.
- June 6 – The Convocation of Canterbury, to investigate and charge the participants in the 1414 Oldcastle Revolt in England, ends after more than two months.
- June 20 – Raoul de Gaucourt and Regnault de Chartres, held prisoners of war in England since being captured during the siege of Harfleur, are paroled in order to serve as England's emissaries to begin discussions of a truce with King Charles VI of France.

==== July–September ====
- July 1 – Henry Chichele, the Roman Catholic Archbishop of Canterbury and Primate of All England, begins the first of his semiannual inquisitions, directing the archdeacons to seek out heretics and bring them to trial.
- July 12 – The Battle of Sant'Egidio is fought in Italy: soldier of fortune Braccio da Montone, Prince of Capua, conquers Umbria and its capital, Perugia.
- July 16 – Following the Venetian Navy triumph over the Ottomans at Gallipoli, Dolfino Venier, the Republic of Venice's ambassador to the Ottoman Empire, reaches an agreement with the Ottoman Sultan Mehmed I to begin discussing a treaty.
- August 15
  - Sigismund, King of Germany, and King Henry V of England conclude the Treaty of Canterbury, an alliance of the two nations against France.
  - Harfleur relieved, following a naval battle in the estuary of the Seine.
- September 3 – King Henry V summons the English Parliament for the third time in less than a year, directing the MPs to assemble on October 19.

==== October–December ====
- October 19 – The English Parliament is opened by King Henry V. The House of Commons elects Roger Flower as its Speaker.
- November 8 – Admiral Pietro Loredan is hailed as a hero upon his return to Venice after the Battle of Gallipoli.
- November 14 – China's Emperor Cheng Zu and his fleet return to Nanjing from his fourth expedition for treasure after having been away since 1413.
- November 19 – At Nanjing, China's Emperor Cheng Zu bestows gifts at a grand ceremony to princes, civil officials, military officers, and the ambassadors of 18 countries.
- December 16 (26 Shawwal 819 AH) – Hasan ibn Ajlan, the Vice Sultan of the Hejaz, becomes the Emir of Mecca again upon the surrender of Rumaythah ibn Muhammad, who usurped the Emirate in February.
- December 28 – China's Emperor Cheng Zu announces a fifth treasure voyage.
- December 30 (10 Dhu al-Qadah 819 AH) – Hamsa Bhat, the Vizier for Ali Shah, the Sultan of Kashmir, is assassinated and Zayn al-Abidin is appointed to replace him.

==== Date unknown ====
- The Trezzo sull'Adda Bridge (the longest arch bridge in the world at this time) is destroyed.
- The Hussite Bible is completed by Tamás Pécsi and Bálint Újlaki.

=== 1417 ===
==== January–March ====
- January 19 – After the dismissal of Al-Musta'in as Caliph of Cairo by the Sultan Shaykh al-Mahmudi is declared unlawful by Islamic clerics, Shaykh arranges Al-Musta'in and three sons of the late Sultan Faraj to be transferred away from Cairo to Alexandria.
- January 19 – Joanna II, Queen of Naples, issues a pardon for Giacomo Orsini, who had rebelled against her predecessor, King Ladislaus of Naples.
- February 15 – In Korea, Grand Prince Yangnyeong of the Joseon Kingdom and heir to the throne, causes a scandal that ends any possibility of becoming the next King. Yangnyeong courts the wife of another official and attempts to bring here into the royal palace in Seoul, ending in his banishment from the royal household and being replaced on June 3, 1418.
- February 24 – An envoy of the Sultan of the Ottoman Empire, identified in Italian records as "Chamitzi", arrives in the Republic of Venice to demand the release of Ottoman soldiers who had been taken as prisoners of war during the conflict between Venice and the Ottomans. The release of each nation's prisoners of war is unresolved and hinders peace negotiations.
- March 5 – Alexios IV becomes the new Emperor of Trebizond (located in what is now Turkey along the Black Sea) upon the death of his father, Manuel III.
- March 10 – In Bohemia, Johannes Cardinalis von Bergreichenstein, rector of the University of Prague issues a proclamation declaring that the theological teachings of the late Jan Hus are doctrine confirmed for all Christians, leading to eventual condemnation by the Roman Catholic Church and the Pope for heresy.

==== April–June ====
- April 5 – Jean de Touraine, the Dauphin of France and heir to the French throne as the eldest living son of King Charles VI, dies suddenly at the age of 18 from a suspected poisoning. Jean's 15-year-old brother, Charles, becomes the new Dauphin.
- April 18 – Frederick I, Elector of Brandenburg, is appointed to an additional position as Archchamberlain of the Holy Roman Empire.
- April 29 – Louis II, Duke of Anjou, and former claimant to being King of Naples, dies at the age of 39 and is succeeded by his 13-year-old son, Louis III.
- May 2 – Władysław II Jagiełło, King of Poland and Grand Duke of Lithuania, remarries less than year after the death of his wife Anna of Cilli, taking Elizabeth Granowska as his third wife in a ceremony at Sanok. Because the Polish nobles do not approve of the marriage, Elizabeth's coronation does not take place for six months.
- May 31 – William, Duke of Bavaria-Straubing and Count of Holland, dies from an infection after being bitten by a dog. His death causes a conflict between his daughter Jacqueline, Countess of Hainaut and his brother John III, with Jacqueline receiving Holland, Zeeland and Hainaut, and John becoming the new Duke.
- June 2 – King Henry V of England issues an order directing penalties for wearing of an unauthorized coat of arms, directing sheriffs, on the day of mustering of persons for an exhibition, to inquire in such cases "by whose gift he holds those arms or coats of arms, except for those who bore arms with us at the Battle of Aguincourt."
- June 24 – The earliest extant description of Tynwald Day; the annual meeting of the Isle of Man's parliament (Tynwald) is written down in law. Its first recorded use for the promulgation of laws dates to 24 June 1417, when Sir John Stanley presided.
- June 29 – An English fleet, led by the Earl of Huntingdon, defeats a fleet of Genoese carracks and captures their admiral, the "Bastard of Bourbon".
- June 30 – In France, the Baron of Trévoux reverses a ban against the town's Jewish population, and allows them to study the Talmud without interference.

==== July–September ====
- July 27 – After being the last claimant to the papacy, the Antipope Benedict XIII is excommunicated and deposed by the Council of Constance, bringing to an end the Great Western Schism.
- July 30 – King Henry V of England begins and invasion of France, where he wishes to claim the throne, taking with him 42,000 soldiers on a fleet of 1,500 ships.
- August 12 – King Henry V of England begins using the English language in correspondence back to England from France, where he is leading a campaign, marking the beginning of this king's continuous usage of English in prose, and the beginning of the restoration of English as an official language for the first time since the Norman Conquest, some 350 years earlier.
- August 18 – King Henry V begins the siege of Caen with bombardment of the walls using advanced weaponry.
- September 4 – English troops succeed in opening the gates of Caen and begin a massacre of over 1,800 civilians.
- September 15 – At Shamakhi (located in what is now the Republic of Azerbaijan), Khalilullah I becomes the new Shirvanshah, ruler of the Kingdom of Shirvan, following the death of his father, the Shirvanshah Ibrahim I.
- September 20 – Siege of Caen (1417): Guillaume de Montenay surrenders Caen to English invaders led by King Henry V. The city remains under English control until 1450.c

==== October–December ====
- October 5 – King Henry V of England summons the English Parliament to assemble on November 16.
- October 31 – On Hallowtide, by order of the Lord May Henry Barton, street lighting is first used in London, with lanterns to be hung out on winter evenings, lasting until the night of Candlemas on February 2.
- November 9 – In what is now the Mediterranean coast of Spain, six-year-old Muhammad VIII becomes the new Sultan of the Emirate of Granada upn the death of his father, the Sultan Yusuf III.
- November 11 – On St. Martin's Day, with all three previous claimants to the office of Pope gone, the 53-member Council of Constance unanimously elects Oddone Colonna to be the new Pontiff. Colonna will take the name of Saint Martin of Tours upon his consecration.
- November 16 – The English Parliament opens at Westminster for a 31-day session and re-elects Roger Flower as Speaker of the House of Commons.
- November 19 – The coronation of Elizabeth Granowska as Queen consort of Poland takes place after King Wladyslaw receives a special dispensation from the Council of Constance.
- November 21 – The coronation of Oddone Colonna as Pope Martin V takes place in Constance as he becomes the 206th Pope of the Roman Catholic Church. His installation ends a period of two years and five months without a Pope at Rome, as he succeeds Pope Gregory XII, who had abdicated on July 4, 1415.
- December 14 – In punishment for his conviction for high treason against the Crown of England, Sir John Oldcastle, Baron Cobham, is hanged outside the church of St Giles in the Fields and then (carrying out the sentence for a prior conviction of heresy) burned, "gallows and all".
- December 17 – The English Parliament closes and King Henry V gives royal assent to its one major law, the Attorney Act 1417, which provides that "All persons until the next parliament may make their attornies in wapentakes, hundreds, and court barons."
- December 20 – Richard Talbot is appointed as the new Archbishop of Dublin, leader of the Roman Catholic Church in Ireland, eight months after the death of the Archbishop Thomas Cranley.

==== Date unknown ====
- Mircea cel Bătrân loses Dobruja to the Ottomans and pays them tribute, thus preventing Wallachia from becoming an Ottoman province.
- Chimalpopoca, son of Huitzilihuitl, succeeds his father as Tlatoani (monarch) of Tenochtitlan (modern Mexico City)
- Imadaddin Nasimi, an Azerbaijani poet and the foremost proponent of Hurufism, was flayed alive and executed in Aleppo, Syria under the order of Aleppan ulema.

=== 1418 ===
==== January–March ====
- January 31 – Mircea I, Prince of Wallachia (now part of southern Romania), dies after a reign of 21 years and is succeeded by his son, Mihail I.
- February 7 – The Lam Sơn uprising in Chinese-occupied Vietnam begins during the Tết holiday as a group of 18 men led by Lê Lợi begin a nine year rebellion against Ming dynasty China.
- February 20 – At Srinagar, in what is now India, Zayn al-Abidin, already the vizier (Wazir) of the Kashmir Sultanate, is crowned as the new Sultan after he overthrows his older brother, the Sultan Ali Shah Miri.
- March 21 – The Concordats of Constance are approved by the Council of Constance for signing by the various parties.
- March 24 – Švitrigaila of Lithuania, son of the late Grand Duke Algirdas, is freed after nine years imprisonment at Lithuania's Kremenets Castle after a group of 500 soldiers, led by Dashko Ostrogski, storm the castle.

==== April–June ====
- April 15 – The delegates from France and Germany sign the Concordats.
- April 22 – The Council of Constance ends.
- May 13 – Spain approves and signs the Concordats of Constance.
- May 29 – Armagnac–Burgundian Civil War: John the Fearless, Duke of Burgundy, captures Paris, forcing King Charles VI to flee from the violence of John's partisans.
- June 3 – Because of the rebellion of his son, Grand Prince Yangnyeong (Yi Che), King Taejong of Korea permanently disowns Yangnyeong as heir to the throne.
- June 12 – Armagnac–Burgundian Civil War: Bernard VII, Count of Armagnac, is assassinated by the Burgundian followers of John the Fearless, Duke of Burgundy, and a massacre of suspected Armagnacs begins, with more than 1,000 and perhaps as many as 5,000 civilians killed.

==== July–September ====
- July 8 – Chungnyeong is named by his father, King Taejong of Korea, as the new heir to the throne as Grand Prince, replacing Yangnyeong.
- July 12 – England approves and signs the Concordats of Constance.
- July 29 – The Army of England, led by King Henry V, begins the siege of Rouen, the capital of Normandy in France. The siege lasts almost six months before the Burgundian French defenders surrender
- August 10 – King Taejong, ruler of the kingdom of Joseon that encompasses most of Korea, agrees to abdicate his throne in order for his son Prince Yi Do to become the new monarch. Taejong then becomes the King Emeritus (Sangwang).
- August 21 – Armagnac–Burgundian Civil War: The massacre of the Armagnacs ends in Paris after as many as 5,000 people have been killed in retaliation for the assassination of John the Fearless.
- August 23 – Beatrice Lascaris di Tenda, Duchess of Milan as the wife of the Duke Filippo Maria Visconti, is secretly arrested for adultery and removed from the walled city of Milan while its gates are locked. On her husband's orders, she is transferred to the Castello Visconteo in nearby Binasco, where she, two of her maidens, and her lover, the troubadour Michele Orombelli, are tortured. Beatrice is beheaded on September 13, and her three accomplices are put to death on the same day.
- September 13 – Commissioned by the Sultan Al-Mu'ayyad Shaykh of Egypt and supervised by the Shaykh's Emir Abu Bakr al-Yaghmuri, the rebuilding of the Ibn Uthman Mosque begins in Gaza City. The Mosque will be completed in 1431 but will be destroyed almost 600 years later in 2024 by an airstrike from the State of Israel.
- September 18 – Prince Yi Do, son of Korea's King Emeritus Taejong, is enthroned as King Sejong, and will make major reforms during his reign of more than 30 years.

==== October–December ====
- October 2 – Sim On is appointed as the new Chief State Councillor of Korea (Yeonguijeong) by the new monarch, King Sejong, but is only in power for three months before being arrested and subsequently executed.
- October 30 – The Byzantine Empire and the Republic of Venice sign a treaty of commerce.
- November 21 – Brandenburg–Pomeranian conflict: In Germany, the Treaty of Ueckermünde is signed by the Dukes of Pomerania-Stettin (Otto II and Casimir V) with the Dukes of Mecklenburg-Schwerin (Albert V), Mecklenburg-Werle (Lord Christopher) and Mecklenburg-Stargard (John III) to ally against the Electorate of Brandenburg, ruled by the House of Hohenzollern elector Friedrich I
- December 28 – The Dauphin Charles, crown prince of France, reclaims the city of Tours from the Burgundians after a month-long siege.
- December 30 – The Ming Chinese explorers, commanded by Admiral Zheng He, arrive in Yemen to open trade with the Arab kingdom, and the admiral is brought to the court of the Emir Al Malik al Nasir. The Chinese stay until January 27.

==== Date unknown ====
- João Gonçalves Zarco leads one of the first Portuguese expeditions to the Madeira Islands.

=== 1419 ===
==== January–March ====
- January 19 – Hundred Years' War: Rouen surrenders to Henry V of England, which brings Normandy under the control of England.
- February 11 – At Zaranj in modern-day Afghanistan, Shams al-Din 'Ali ibn Qutb al-Din becomes the new malik (monarch) of Sistan upon the death of his father, Qutb al-Din Muhammad ibn Shams al-Din Shah 'Ali.
- February 13 – The University of Rostock is established in Germany by Albert V, Duke of Mecklenburg following approval in a papal bull from Pope Martin V.
- March 14 – Braccio da Montone is awarded Governorship of Bologna by Pope Martin V in recognition of his ouster of Antongaleazzo Bentivoglio.
- March 19 – (26 Muharram 822 AH) Sultan al-Malik al-Nāsir of Yemen presents a set of Yemeni gifts for the Chinese envoy to Aden to take back to China's Emperor Cheng Zu, after having received gifts from the Chinese in January.

==== April–June ====
- April 25 – Representatives of the Swiss cantons of Lucerne, Uri and Unterwalden begin negotiations in Zurich with the Canton of Bern in an attempt to prevent the breakup of the Swiss Confederation. The negotiations soon fail.
- May 10 – In Italy's Republic of Florence, the republic is elevated to the level of an archdioese by Pope Martin V, who spent 18 months in Florence after being elected by the Council of Constance. In recognition of the hospitality accorded to him, Pope Martin names Bishop Amerigo Corsini to be the first Archbishop of Florence.
- May 14 – The Treaty of Torun ends the war between the Teutonic Knights and the Polish and Lithuanian Kingdom.
- May 15 – Raron affair: In Switzerland, The representatives of Lucerne, Uri and Unterwalden leave Zurich and halt further discussion with Bern after failing to win any concessions.
- May 29 – King Henry V of England is betrothed to Princess Catherine of Valois, the 17-year-old daughter of King Charles VI of France, in negotiations in the neutral site of Pontoise, north of Paris, during a halt to hostilities in the war between the two kingdoms. Henry and Catherine will marry a little more than a year later, on June 2, 1420.
- June 20 – The Ōei Invasion of Tsushima Island, Japan on orders of King Sejong of Korea, begins as General Yi Jong-mu leads 227 ships and 17,285 soldiers to come ashore at Asō Bay.
- June 26 – Ōei Invasion: A Japanese counterattack begins with 3,700 Korean invaders killed over the next six days.

==== July–September ====
- July 1 – Portuguese explorers João Gonçalves Zarco, Tristão Vaz Teixeira and Bartolomeu Perestrello, at the service of Prince Henry the Navigator, discover Madeira Island, a year after Zarco and Tristão had discovered Porto Santo Island.
- July 3 – The Ōei Invasion ends as the Korean soldiers withdraw from Tsushima and reassembe at Geoje Island.
- July 30 – The first defenestration of Prague occurs in the Kingdom of Bohemia when a mob led by Jan Želivský storms the Town Hall and kills several members of the town council by throwing them out of a window.
- August 16 – King Wenceslaus IV of Bohemia dies of a heart attack at the age of 58, leading to the outbreak shortly thereafter of the Hussite Wars.
- August 17 – Siege of Ceuta: After four days of battle, the Portuguese defenders of the city of Ceuta are able to force a retreat of invaders from Morocco.
- August 24 – King Henry V of England directs the members of the House of Commons and the House of Lords to assemble at Westminster by October 16.
- September 10 – John the Fearless, Duke of Burgundy is assassinated by adherents of the Dauphin.

==== October–December ====
- October 16 – The first session, in almost two years, of the English Parliament is opened by King Henry V. The House of Commons re-elects Roger Flower as its speaker.
- November 7 – The Ottoman–Venetian peace treaty ends four years of conflict, by recognizing Venetian possessions in the Aegean and the Balkans.
- November 13 – The 1419 session of the English Parliament closes after four weeks.
- November 24 – The Timurid ruler of Persia, Mirza Shahrukh (r. 1404–1447), sends a large embassy to the court of Emperor Cheng Zu of China. The group arrives in China on 29 August 1420. One of the Persian envoys, Ghiyāth al-dīn Naqqāsh, keeps a diary of his travels throughout China, which soon becomes widely known throughout Iranian and the Turkic Middle East, thanks to its inclusion into historical works by Hafiz-i Abru, and Abdur Razzaq. Naqqash writes about China's wealthy economy and huge urban markets, its efficient courier system as compared to that in Persia, the hospitality of his hosts at the courier stations in providing comfortable lodging and food, and the fine luxurious goods and craftsmanship of the Chinese.
- December 4 – Louis III of Anjou is invested by Pope Martin V as the new King of Sicily.

==== Date unknown ====
- Mihail I defends Wallachia against the Ottomans, with Hungarian help.
- The final 41 treasure ships are built in the Nanjing shipyards for use in the expeditions of Zheng He.

== Births ==
1410

- January 30 – William Calthorpe, English knight (d. 1494)
- July 14 – Arnold, Duke of Guelders, Duke of Guelders (1423–1465 and 1471–1473) (d. 1473)
- August 1 – John IV, Count of Nassau-Siegen (1442–1475) (d. 1475)
- date unknown
  - Masuccio Salernitano, Italian poet (d. 1475)
  - William Sinclair, 1st Earl of Caithness (d. 1484)
- probable
  - Johannes Ockeghem, Dutch composer (d. 1497)
  - Ólöf Loftsdóttir, politically active Icelandic woman (d. 1479)
  - Conrad Paumann, German organist and composer (d. 1473)
  - Vecchietta, Sienese painter, sculptor and architect (d. 1480)

1411

- September 21 – Richard of York, 3rd Duke of York, claimant to the English throne (d. 1460)
- date unknown – Juan de Mena, Spanish poet (d. 1456)
- Margareta of Celje, Polish Duchess (d. 1480)

1412

- January 6 – Joan of Arc, French soldier and saint (tradition holds that she was born on the Feast of the Epiphany, but there is no documentary evidence) (d. 1431)
- January 26 – William IV, Lord of Egmont, IJsselstein, Schoonderwoerd and Haastrecht and Stadtholder of Guelders (d. 1483)
- April 22 – Reinhard III, Count of Hanau (1451–1452) (d. 1452)
- June 5 – Ludovico III Gonzaga, Marquis of Mantua (d. 1478)
- August 22 – Frederick II, Elector of Saxony and Margrave of Meissen (1428–1464) and Landgrave of Thuringia (1440–1445) (d. 1464)
- November 17 – Zanobi Strozzi, Italian painter (d. 1468)
- December 8 – Astorre II Manfredi, Italian noble (d. 1468)

1413

- February 24 – Louis, Duke of Savoy (d. 1465)
- September 8 – Catherine of Bologna, Italian cloistered nun (d. 1463)
- November 19 – Frederick II, Elector of Brandenburg (d. 1471)
- date unknown – Joanot Martorell, Spanish writer (d. 1468)

1414

- January 7 – Henry II, Count of Nassau-Siegen, Co-ruler of Nassau-Siegen (1442–1451) (d. 1451)
- March 25 – Thomas Clifford, 8th Baron de Clifford, English noble (d. 1455)
- May 11 – Francis I, Duke of Brittany (d. 1450)
- July 21 – Pope Sixtus IV (d. 1484)
- November 7 – Jami, Persian poet (d. 1492)
- November 9 – Albrecht III Achilles, Elector of Brandenburg, Prince-elector of the Margraviate of Brandenburg (d. 1486)
- date unknown
  - Charles I, Count of Nevers, Count of Nevers and Rethel (d. 1464)
- probable – Narsinh Mehta, poet-saint of Gujarat (d. 1481)

1415

- March 10 – Vasily II of Moscow, Grand Prince (d. 1462)
- March 14 – Wilhelm II, Count of Henneberg-Schleusingen (d. 1444)
- May 3 – Cecily Neville, English duchess, mother of Edward IV of England and Richard III of England (d. 1495)
- September 12 – John Mowbray, 3rd Duke of Norfolk, English magnate (d. 1461)
- September 16 – Elizabeth de Beauchamp, Baroness Bergavenny, English baroness (d. 1448)
- September 21 – Frederick III, Holy Roman Emperor (d. 1493)
- October 18 – Heinrich von Dissen, German theologian (d. 1484)
- November 26 – Han Myŏnghoe, Korean politician (d. 1487)
- December 1 – Jan Długosz, Polish historian (d. 1480)
- date unknown
  - Benedetto Accolti, Italian jurist and historian (d. 1464)
  - Rennyo, Japanese Buddhist leader (d. 1499)
  - Chakkaphat Phaen Phaeo, Lan Xang king (d. 1481)

1416

- February 26 – Christopher of Bavaria (d. 1448)
- March 27 – Antonio Squarcialupi, Italian organist and composer (d. 1480)
- March 28 – Jodha of Mandore, Ruler of Marwar (d. 1489)
- May 25 – Jakobus, nobleman from Lichtenberg in the northern part of Alsace (d. 1480)
- October 26 – Edmund Grey, 1st Earl of Kent (d. 1490)
- date unknown
  - Benedetto Cotrugli, Ragusan/Croatian merchant, economist, scientist, diplomat and humanist (d. 1469)
  - Pal Engjëlli, Albanian Catholic clergyman (d. 1470)
  - Francis of Paola, founder of the Order of the Minims (d. 1507)
  - Piero di Cosimo de' Medici, ruler of Florence (d. 1469)
- probable – Jacquetta of Luxembourg, English duchess and countess (d. 1472)

1417

- February 23
  - Pope Paul II (d. 1471)
  - Louis IX, Duke of Bavaria-Landshut (1450–1479) (d. 1479)
- May 25 – Catherine of Cleves, Duchess consort regent of Guelders (d. 1479)
- June 19 – Sigismondo Pandolfo Malatesta, lord of Rimini (d. 1468)
- November 8 – Philipp I, Count of Hanau-Lichtenberg (1458–1480) (d. 1480)
- November 19 – Frederick I, Count Palatine of Simmern from 1459 until 1480 (d. 1480)
- November 23 – William FitzAlan, 16th Earl of Arundel, English politician (d. 1487)
- date unknown
  - Jöns Bengtsson Oxenstierna, regent of Sweden 1457 and 1465–1466, archbishop of Uppsala 1448–1467
  - Nicholas of Flüe, Swiss hermit and saint (d. 1487)

1418

- January 9 – Juan Ramón Folch III de Cardona, Aragonese admiral (d. 1485)
- March 14 – Philip II, Count of Nassau-Weilburg (1429–1492) (d. 1492)
- April 20 – Earl David of Rookwood
- May 16 – John II of Cyprus, King of Cyprus and Armenia and also titular King of Jerusalem from 1432 to 1458 (d. 1458)
- August 5 – Malatesta Novello, Italian condottiero (d. 1465)
- September 24 – Anne of Cyprus, Italian noble (d. 1462)
- November 2 – Gaspare Nadi, Italian builder famous for his diary (diario) (d. 1504)
- November 20 – Robert de Morley, 6th Baron Morley, Lord of Morley Saint Botolph (d. 1442)
- December 8 – Queen Jeonghui, Queen consort of Korea (d. 1483)
- December 12 – Archduke Albert VI of Austria (d. 1463)
- date unknown – Peter II, Duke of Brittany (d. 1457)
  - Isotta Nogarola, Italian writer and intellectual (d. 1466)

1419

- February – Abu 'Amr 'Uthman, Hafsid caliph of Ifriqiya (d. 1488)
- February 16 – John I, Duke of Cleves (d. 1481)
- March 24 – Ginevra d'Este (d. 1440)
- June 24 – John of Sahagún, Spanish Augustinian friar, priest and saint (d. 1479)
- July 10 – Emperor Go-Hanazono of Japan (d. 1471)
- November 1 – Albert II, Duke of Brunswick-Grubenhagen (d. 1485)
- date unknown
  - Abd al-Haqq II, last Marinid Sultan of Morocco (d. 1465)
  - Barbara Fugger, German banker (d. 1497)

== Deaths ==
1410

- March 5 – Matthew of Kraków, Polish reformer (b. 1335)
- March 16 – John Beaufort, 1st Earl of Somerset (b. 1373)
- May 3 – Antipope Alexander V, (b. 1339)
- May 18 – Rupert of Germany, Count Palatine of the Rhine (b. 1352)
- May 31 – Martin of Aragon (b. 1356)
- July 15 – Ulrich von Jungingen, German Grand Master of the Teutonic Knights (in battle) (b. 1360)
- August – Matthew I of Constantinople
- August 10 – Louis II, Duke of Bourbon (b. 1337)
- date unknown
  - Margareta Dume, influential Swedish-Finnish noble
  - John Badby, English martyr

1411

- January 18 – Jobst of Moravia, ruler of Moravia, King of the Romans
- February 6 – Esau de' Buondelmonti, ruler of Epirus
- June 3 –Leopold IV, Duke of Austria (b. 1371)
- September – Anne de Mortimer, Countess of Cambridge (b. 1390)
- November 4 – Khalil Sultan, ruler of Transoxiana (b. 1384)
- probable – Hasdai Crescas, Jewish philosopher

1412

- March – Albrekt of Mecklenburg, king of Sweden 1364–1389 (b. 1336)
- April 2 – Ruy Gonzáles de Clavijo, Castilian traveller and writer
- May 16 – Gian Maria Visconti, Duke of Milan
- August 6 – Margherita of Durazzo, Queen consort of Charles III of Naples (b. 1347)
- September 14 – Ingegerd Knutsdotter, Swedish abbess (b. 1356)
- October 28 – Margaret I of Denmark, queen regnant of Denmark of Norway since 1387 and of Sweden since 1389 (b. 1353)
- date unknown – Ignatius Abraham bar Garib, Syriac Orthodox Patriarch of Mardin
- date unknown – Jalal ad-Din khan, khan of the Golden Horde

1413

- January 25 – Maud de Ufford, Countess of Oxford (b. 1345)
- March 20 – Henry IV of England (b. 1367)
- July 5 – Musa Çelebi, Ottoman prince and co-ruler of the Ottoman Empire
- September 26 – Stephen III, Duke of Bavaria (b. 1337)
- October 6 – Dawit I of Ethiopia (b. 1382)
- December 26 – Michele Steno, Doge of Venice (b. 1331)

1414

- February 19 – Thomas Arundel, Archbishop of Canterbury (b. 1353)
- March 28 – Jeanne-Marie de Maille, French Roman Catholic saint (b. 1331)
- June 23 – Tewodros I, Emperor of Ethiopia
- August 6 – King Ladislaus of Naples (b. 1377)
- September 1 – William de Ros, 6th Baron de Ros, Lord Treasurer of England (b. 1369)
- date unknown
  - Fairuzabadi, Persian lexicographer (b. 1329)
  - Ali ibn Mohammed al-Jurjani, Persian encyclopaedic writer (b. 1339)
  - John I Stanley of the Isle of Man, Lord Lieutenant of Ireland, King of the Isle of Man (b. 1350)
- probable – Zyndram of Maszkowice, Polish 14th- and 15th-century knight (b. 1355)

1415

- April 15 – Manuel Chrysoloras, Greek humanist
- July 6 – Jan Hus, Bohemian reformer (burned at the stake) (b. 1369)
- July 19 – Philippa of Lancaster, queen of John I of Portugal (plague) (b. 1359)
- August 2 – Thomas Grey, conspirator against King Henry V (executed) (b. 1384)
- August 5
  - Richard of Conisburgh, 3rd Earl of Cambridge (executed) (b. 1375)
  - Henry Scrope, 3rd Baron Scrope of Masham (executed) (b. 1370)
- September 17 – Michael de la Pole, 2nd Earl of Suffolk (killed in battle) (b. 1367)
- October 13 – Thomas FitzAlan, 12th Earl of Arundel, English military leader (b. 1381)
- October 25 (killed in Battle of Agincourt)
  - John I of Alençon (b. 1385)
  - Charles d'Albret, Count of Dreux and Constable of France
  - Antoine, Duke of Brabant (b. 1384)
  - Michael de la Pole, 3rd Earl of Suffolk (b. 1394)
  - Frederick of Lorraine, Count of Vaudémont (b. 1371)
  - Philip II, Count of Nevers (b. 1389)
  - Edward of Norwich, 2nd Duke of York (b. 1373)
  - Dafydd Gam, Welsh nobleman (b. c. 1380)

1416

- February 2 – Racek Kobyla of Dvorce, Bohemian Hetman and Burgrave.
- February 27 – Eleanor of Castile, queen consort of Navarre (b. c. 1363)
- April 2 – King Ferdinand I of Aragon (b. 1379)
- May 21 – Anna of Celje, queen consort of Poland (b. c. 1381)
- May 30 – Jerome of Prague, Czech theologian (executed) (b. 1379)
- June 15 – John, Duke of Berry, son of John II of France (b. 1340)
- September 4 – John I, Count of Nassau-Siegen, German count
- October 1 – Yaqub Spata, lord of Arta
- October 14 – Henry the Mild, Duke of Brunswick-Lüneburg
- December 29 – Mathew Swetenham, bowbearer of Henry IV
- date unknown – The Limbourg brothers, painters of the Très Riches Heures du Duc de Berry.
- probable
  - Owain Glyndŵr, Welsh prince and leader of the Welsh Revolt
  - Julian of Norwich, English anchoress, mystic and author

1417

- January – Art mac Art MacMurrough-Kavanagh, King of Leinster (b. 1357)
- March 5 – Manuel III Megas Komnenos, Emperor of Trebizond (b. 1364)
- April 29 – Louis II of Anjou (b. 1377)
- May 31 – William II, Duke of Bavaria (b. 1365)
- September 4 – Robert Hallam, English Catholic bishop
- September 22 – Anne of Auvergne, Sovereign Dauphine of Auvergne and Countess of Forez (b. 1358)
- September 26 – Francesco Zabarella, Italian jurist (b. 1360)
- October 18 – Pope Gregory XII (b. c. 1325)
- November 17 – Gazi Evrenos, Ottoman general (b. 1288)
- December 14 – John Oldcastle, English Lollard leader (executed)
- probable – Huitzilíhuitl, Aztec ruler of Tenochtitlan

1418

- January 31 – Mircea I of Wallachia, ruler of Wallachia (b. 1355)
- March 22 – Dietrich of Nieheim, German historian
- June 2 – Katherine of Lancaster, queen of Henry III of Castile
- June 12 – Bernard VII, Count of Armagnac, Constable of France (b. 1360)
- November 25 – Henry Beaufort, 2nd Earl of Somerset (b. 1401)
- December 11 – Louis of Piedmont (b. 1364)
- date unknown
  - Ixtlilxochitl I, ruler of the Mesoamerican city-state of Texcoco, and ally of the Aztecs.
  - Foelke Kampana, Frisian lady and regent (b. 1355)

1419

- April 5 – Vincent Ferrer, Spanish missionary and saint (b. 1350)
- August 16 – Wenceslaus IV of Bohemia, King of Bohemia since 1378 (b. 1361)
- September 10 – John the Fearless, Duke of Burgundy (assassinated) (b. 1371)
- December 17 – William Gascoigne, Chief Justice of England
- December 22 – Antipope John XXIII
- date unknown
  - Je Tsongkhapa, founder of the Geluk school of Tibetan Buddhism (b. 1357)
  - Stella de’ Tolomei, Italian courtier

== Works cited ==
- Chevalier, Bernard (1985). Histoire de Tours (in French). Toulouse: Privat. ISBN 2-7089-8224-9.
