= 1418 =

1418 in various calendars
- Gregorian calendar: 1418; MCDXVIII
- Ab urbe condita: 2171
- Armenian calendar: 867; ԹՎ ՊԿԷ
- Assyrian calendar: 6168
- Balinese saka calendar: 1339–1340
- Bengali calendar: 824–825
- Berber calendar: 2368
- English Regnal year: 5 Hen. 5 – 6 Hen. 5
- Buddhist calendar: 1962
- Burmese calendar: 780
- Byzantine calendar: 6926–6927
- Chinese calendar: 丁酉年 (Fire Rooster); 4115 or 3908 — to — 戊戌年 (Earth Dog); 4116 or 3909
- Coptic calendar: 1134–1135
- Discordian calendar: 2584
- Ethiopian calendar: 1410–1411
- Hebrew calendar: 5178–5179
- Hindu calendars
- Vikram Samvat: 1474–1475
- Shaka Samvat: 1339–1340
- Kali Yuga: 4518–4519
- Holocene calendar: 11418
- Igbo calendar: 418–419
- Iranian calendar: 796–797
- Islamic calendar: 820–821
- Japanese calendar: Ōei 25 (応永２５年)
- Javanese calendar: 1332–1333
- Julian calendar: 1418; MCDXVIII
- Korean calendar: 3751
- Minguo calendar: 494 before ROC 民前494年
- Nanakshahi calendar: −50
- Thai solar calendar: 1960–1961
- Tibetan calendar: མེ་མོ་བྱ་ལོ་ (female Fire-Bird); 1544 or 1163 or 391 — to — ས་ཕོ་ཁྱི་ལོ་ (male Earth-Dog); 1545 or 1164 or 392

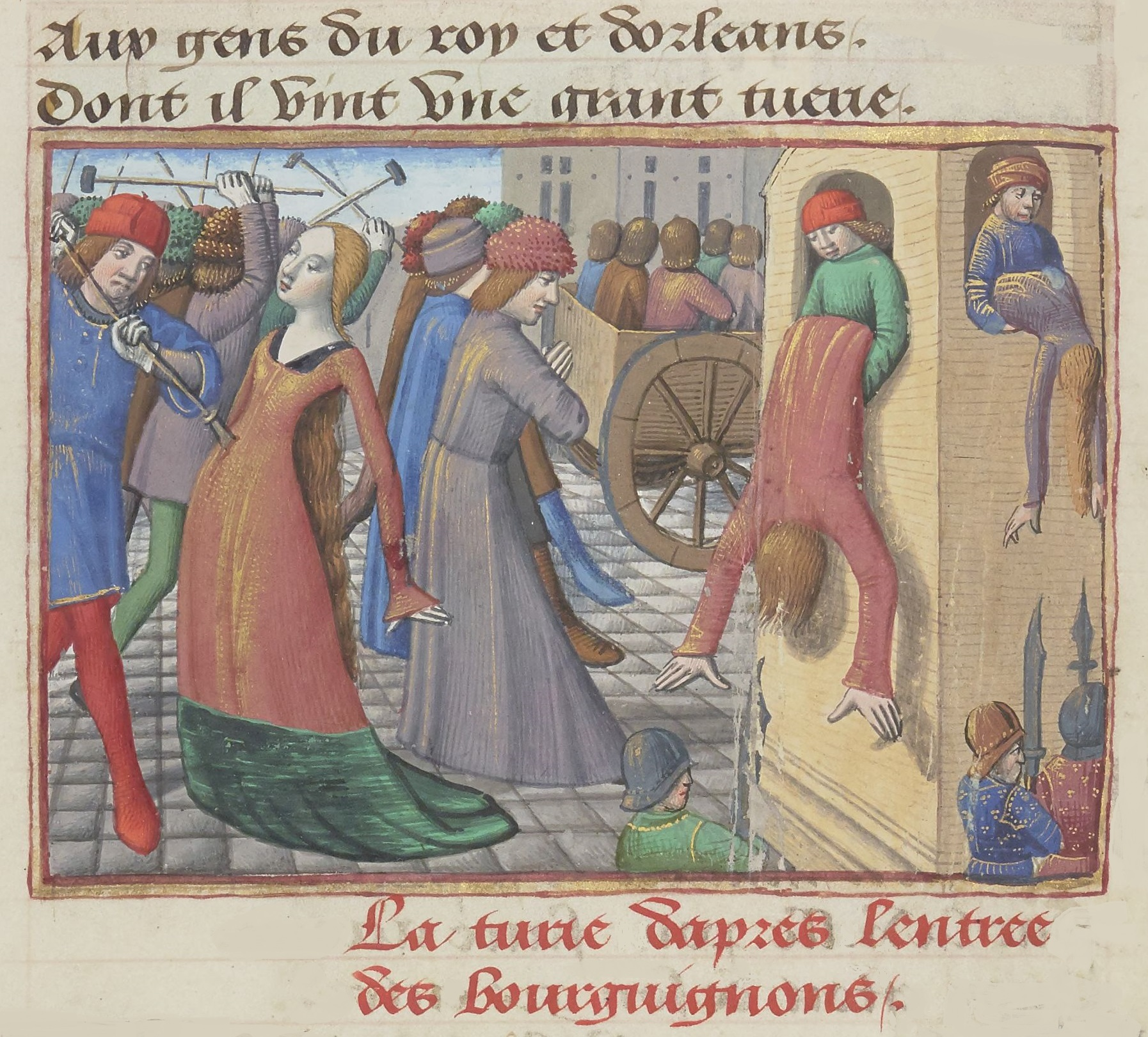
John the Fearless takes control of Paris, setting off a massacre of thousands of suspected supporters of the Armagnacs

Year 1418 (MCDXVIII) was a common year starting on Saturday of the Julian calendar.

== Events ==
=== January–March ===
- January 31 – Mircea I, Prince of Wallachia (now part of southern Romania), dies after a reign of 21 years and is succeeded by his son, Mihail I.
- February 7 – The Lam Sơn uprising in Chinese-occupied Vietnam begins during the Tết holiday as a group of 18 men led by Lê Lợi begin a nine year rebellion against Ming dynasty China.
- February 20 – At Srinagar, in what is now India, Zayn al-Abidin, already the vizier (Wazir) of the Kashmir Sultanate, is crowned as the new Sultan after he overthrows his older brother, the Sultan Ali Shah Miri.
- March 21 – The Concordats of Constance are approved by the Council of Constance for signing by the various parties.
- March 24 – Švitrigaila of Lithuania, son of the late Grand Duke Algirdas, is freed after nine years imprisonment at Lithuania's Kremenets Castle after a group of 500 soldiers, led by Dashko Ostrogski, storm the castle.

=== April–June ===
- April 15 – The delegates from France and Germany sign the Concordats.
- April 22 – The Council of Constance ends.
- May 13 – Spain approves and signs the Concordats of Constance.
- May 29 – Armagnac–Burgundian Civil War: John the Fearless, Duke of Burgundy, captures Paris, forcing King Charles VI to flee from the violence of John's partisans.
- June 3 – Because of the rebellion of his son, Grand Prince Yangnyeong (Yi Che), King Taejong of Korea permanently disowns Yangnyeong as heir to the throne.
- June 12 – Armagnac–Burgundian Civil War: Bernard VII, Count of Armagnac, is assassinated by the Burgundian followers of John the Fearless, Duke of Burgundy, and a massacre of suspected Armagnacs begins, with more than 1,000 and perhaps as many as 5,000 civilians killed.

=== July–September ===
- July 8 – Chungnyeong is named by his father, King Taejong of Korea, as the new heir to the throne as Grand Prince, replacing Yangnyeong.
- July 12 – England approves and signs the Concordats of Constance.
- July 29 – The Army of England, led by King Henry V, begins the siege of Rouen, the capital of Normandy in France. The siege lasts almost six months before the Burgundian French defenders surrender
- August 10 – King Taejong, ruler of the kingdom of Joseon that encompasses most of Korea, agrees to abdicate his throne in order for his son Prince Yi Do to become the new monarch. Taejong then becomes the King Emeritus (Sangwang).
- August 21 – Armagnac–Burgundian Civil War: The massacre of the Armagnacs ends in Paris after as many as 5,000 people have been killed in retaliation for the assassination of John the Fearless.
- August 23 – Beatrice Lascaris di Tenda, Duchess of Milan as the wife of the Duke Filippo Maria Visconti, is secretly arrested for adultery and removed from the walled city of Milan while its gates are locked. On her husband's orders, she is transferred to the Castello Visconteo in nearby Binasco, where she, two of her maidens, and her lover, the troubadour Michele Orombelli, are tortured. Beatrice is beheaded on September 13, and her three accomplices are put to death on the same day.
- September 13 – Commissioned by the Sultan Al-Mu'ayyad Shaykh of Egypt and supervised by the Shaykh's Emir Abu Bakr al-Yaghmuri, the rebuilding of the Ibn Uthman Mosque begins in Gaza City. The Mosque will be completed in 1431 but will be destroyed almost 600 years later in 2024 by an airstrike from the State of Israel.
- September 18 – Prince Yi Do, son of Korea's King Emeritus Taejong, is enthroned as King Sejong, and will make major reforms during his reign of more than 30 years.

=== October–December ===
- October 2 – Sim On is appointed as the new Chief State Councillor of Korea (Yeonguijeong) by the new monarch, King Sejong, but is only in power for three months before being arrested and subsequently executed.
- October 30 – The Byzantine Empire and the Republic of Venice sign a treaty of commerce.
- November 21 – Brandenburg–Pomeranian conflict: In Germany, the Treaty of Ueckermünde is signed by the Dukes of Pomerania-Stettin (Otto II and Casimir V) with the Dukes of Mecklenburg-Schwerin (Albert V), Mecklenburg-Werle (Lord Christopher) and Mecklenburg-Stargard (John III) to ally against the Electorate of Brandenburg, ruled by the House of Hohenzollern elector Friedrich I
- December 28 – The Dauphin Charles, crown prince of France, reclaims the city of Tours from the Burgundians after a month-long siege.
- December 30 – The Ming Chinese explorers, commanded by Admiral Zheng He, arrive in Yemen to open trade with the Arab kingdom, and the admiral is brought to the court of the Emir Al Malik al Nasir. The Chinese stay until January 27.

=== Date unknown ===
- João Gonçalves Zarco leads one of the first Portuguese expeditions to the Madeira Islands.

== Births ==
- January 9 – Juan Ramón Folch III de Cardona, Aragonese admiral (d. 1485)
- March 14 – Philip II, Count of Nassau-Weilburg (1429–1492) (d. 1492)
- April 20 – Earl David of Rookwood
- May 16 – John II of Cyprus, King of Cyprus and Armenia and also titular King of Jerusalem from 1432 to 1458 (d. 1458)
- August 5 – Malatesta Novello, Italian condottiero (d. 1465)
- September 24 – Anne of Cyprus, Italian noble (d. 1462)
- November 2 – Gaspare Nadi, Italian builder famous for his diary (diario) (d. 1504)
- November 20 – Robert de Morley, 6th Baron Morley, Lord of Morley Saint Botolph (d. 1442)
- December 8 – Queen Jeonghui, Queen consort of Korea (d. 1483)
- December 12 – Archduke Albert VI of Austria (d. 1463)
- date unknown – Peter II, Duke of Brittany (d. 1457)
  - Isotta Nogarola, Italian writer and intellectual (d. 1466)

== Deaths ==
- January 31 – Mircea I of Wallachia, ruler of Wallachia (b. 1355)
- March 22 – Dietrich of Nieheim, German historian
- June 2 – Katherine of Lancaster, queen of Henry III of Castile
- June 12 – Bernard VII, Count of Armagnac, Constable of France (b. 1360)
- November 25 – Henry Beaufort, 2nd Earl of Somerset (b. 1401)
- December 11 – Louis of Piedmont (b. 1364)
- date unknown
  - Ixtlilxochitl I, ruler of the Mesoamerican city-state of Texcoco, and ally of the Aztecs.
  - Foelke Kampana, Frisian lady and regent (b. 1355)

== Works cited ==
- Chevalier, Bernard (1985). Histoire de Tours (in French). Toulouse: Privat. ISBN 2-7089-8224-9.
