= 1412 =

1412 in various calendars
- Gregorian calendar: 1412; MCDXII
- Ab urbe condita: 2165
- Armenian calendar: 861; ԹՎ ՊԿԱ
- Assyrian calendar: 6162
- Balinese saka calendar: 1333–1334
- Bengali calendar: 818–819
- Berber calendar: 2362
- English Regnal year: 13 Hen. 4 – 14 Hen. 4
- Buddhist calendar: 1956
- Burmese calendar: 774
- Byzantine calendar: 6920–6921
- Chinese calendar: 辛卯年 (Metal Rabbit); 4109 or 3902 — to — 壬辰年 (Water Dragon); 4110 or 3903
- Coptic calendar: 1128–1129
- Discordian calendar: 2578
- Ethiopian calendar: 1404–1405
- Hebrew calendar: 5172–5173
- Hindu calendars
- Vikram Samvat: 1468–1469
- Shaka Samvat: 1333–1334
- Kali Yuga: 4512–4513
- Holocene calendar: 11412
- Igbo calendar: 412–413
- Iranian calendar: 790–791
- Islamic calendar: 814–815
- Japanese calendar: Ōei 19 (応永１９年)
- Javanese calendar: 1326–1327
- Julian calendar: 1412; MCDXII
- Korean calendar: 3745
- Minguo calendar: 500 before ROC 民前500年
- Nanakshahi calendar: −56
- Thai solar calendar: 1954–1955
- Tibetan calendar: ལྕགས་མོ་ཡོས་ལོ་ (female Iron-Hare); 1538 or 1157 or 385 — to — ཆུ་ཕོ་འབྲུག་ལོ་ (male Water-Dragon); 1539 or 1158 or 386

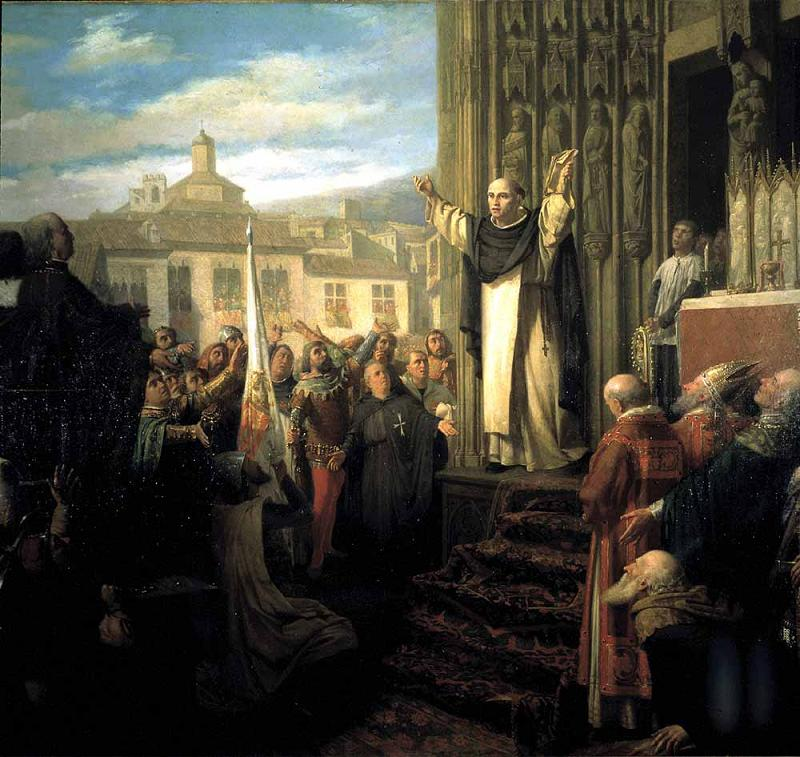
June 28: The declaration of the Compromise of Caspe is read aloud, proclaiming Ferdinand to be the King of Aragon, ending a two-year dispute.

Year 1412 (MCDXII) was a leap year starting on Friday on the Julian calendar.

== Events ==
=== January–March ===
- January 16 – The Medici family are made official bankers of the Papacy.
- January 25 – Ernest, Duke of Austria, marries Cymburgis of Masovia.
- January 29 – The "Mining Code" (Zakon o Rudnishma) is enacted in Serbia by the Despot Stefan Lazarević to regulate the extraction of minerals.
- February 15 – The Alcañiz Concord is reached in the Spanish Aragonese city of Alcañiz to have a group of nine delegates choose an undisputed King of Aragon.
- February 27 – Battle of Morvedre: In the Spanish Kingdom of Valencia, supporters of Ferdinand of Antequera defeat those of James II, Count of Urgell.
- February 28 – The University of St Andrews in Scotland is granted a charter of privilege by the local bishop.
- March 15 – Treaty of Lubowla: After the Peace of Thorn (1411), Grand Master of the Teutonic Order Heinrich von Plauen asks Sigismund of Hungary for economic aid. Sigismund agrees to mediate reduction to the third installment, demarcation of the Samogitian border, and other matters, with a grand tournament. Hunts and lavish feasts are also organized. Sigismund invites, among others, Polish king Wladyslaw Jagiello, Heinrich von Plauen and Bosnian king Tvrtko II. There are people from 17 countries and languages - 40,000 nobles and 2000 knights are present from all over Europe, including England.
- March 29 – Compromise of Caspe: Nine delegates are chosen in Spain in the town of Caspe to arrive at an agreement to resolve the question of which of six relatives of the late King Martin on May 31, 1410 should be the new King of Aragon.

=== April–June ===
- April 12 – Albert V, son of the former King of Sweden, Duke Albert IV, becomes the Duke of Mecklenburg (part of modern-day Germany) upon the death of his father.
- May 7 – In Cairo, Abu’l-Faḍl Abbas Al-Musta'in, the Caliph of Cairo, is installed by rebels as the new Sultan of Egypt as a temporary replacement for his father, the Sultan An-Nasir Faraj. Al-Musta'in serves as the puppet ruler for six months before he returns to full time duty as the Caliph.
- May 16 – Gian Maria Visconti, the Duke of Milan since 1402, is assassinated in front of the church of San Gottardo in Milan by a party of Milanese Ghibellines on the orders of his terminally ill rival, Facino Cane. Visconti is stabbed in the leg and then in his head. Filippo Maria Visconti, Gian Maria's son, becomes the new Duke of Milan.
- May 18 – The Treaty of Bourges is signed between King Henry IV of England and Charles, Duke of Orléans, as the Armagnacs offer England full sovereignty over Aquitaine and Gascony in return for 4,000 troops and military aid against the Burgundians and John the Fearless.
- May 23 – An-Nasir Faraj, the Mamluk Sultan of Egypt and Syria, is stabbed to death in Damascus after surrendering to the Emirs of Syria. Nawruz al-Hafizi becomes ruler of the Syrian provinces and Faraj's son Al-Musta'in is confirmed as ruler of the Egyptian territory.
- June 14 – Antipope John XXIII signs an agreement with King Ladislaus of Naples, paying him 75,000 florins (262.5 kg or 9,375 oz. of gold), investing Ladislaus with the Neapolitan crown, and naming him as Gonfalonier of the Church within the Papal States. In return, King Ladislaus agrees to expel Pope Benedict XII from Naples and to recognize John as the Pope of the Roman Catholic Church.
- June 24 – Compromise of Caspe: By a vote of nine delegates (three each from the Kingdom of Aragon, the Kingdom of Valencia and the Principality of Catalonia), Ferdinand of Antequera is selected as the new King of Aragon and King of Sicily, after a two year succession crisis that arose from 1410 death of King Martin.
- June 28 – As the Compromise of Carpe is read aloud by Friar Vicent Ferrer before a crowd, Ferdinand I is proclaimed as the King of Aragon by the deleagates at Caspe.

=== July–September ===
- July 24 – Behnam Hadloyo becomes Syriac Orthodox Patriarch of Mardin.
- August 14 – The Peace of Auxerre is signed between the Duchy of Burgundy and the Armagnacs, betrothing Philip, Count of Vertus, younger brother of the late Louis I, Duke of Orléans to marry Catherine of Burgundy, the daughter of John the Fearless. The marriage never takes place.
- August 24 – The Battle of Motta is fought when the Republic of Venice is forced to defend an invasion by an invading army of Hungarians, Germans and Croats. The invading force suffers a heavy defeat, losing 1,300 killed and 400 captured.
- September 3 – King Ferdinand I of Aragon is declared Count of Barcelona.

=== October–December ===
- October 5 (29th day of 8th month Ōei 19) – Emperor Go-Komatsu abdicates, and Emperor Shoko accedes to the throne of Japan.
- October 28 – Erik of Pomerania becomes sole ruler of the Kalmar Union (Sweden, Denmark and Norway) on the death of Queen Margaret.
- November 6 – The rebel Emir Al-Mu'ayyad Shaykh becomes the new Mamluk Sultan of Egypt by forcing the reigning Sultan Al-Musta'in to abdicate. Shaykh allows Al-Musta'in to continue as Caliph of Cairo.
- November 8 (5th waxing of Nadaw 774 ME) – Ava–Hanthawaddy War: In modern-day Myanmar, King Razadarit of Hanthawaddy leads the invasion of the city of Prome with 4,000 troops.
- December 1 – King Henry IV of England issues a summons of the English Parliament for his final time, directing the members of Commons and the House of Lords to assemble on February 3.
- December 18 – China's Emperor Cheng Zu orders the fourth of the Ming treasure voyages, to be led by Admiral Zheng He.
- December – Battle of Chalagan: The Kara Koyunlu Turkomans defeat the Georgians under Constantine I of Georgia, and their ally Ibrahim I of Shirvan.

=== Date unknown ===
- The first mention is made of Wallachian knights competing in a jousting tournament, in Buda.
- John II of Castile declares the Valladolid laws, that restrict the social rights of Jews. Among many other restrictions, the laws force Jews to wear distinctive clothes, and deny them administrative positions.
- Years after its publication in the 14th century, the Ming dynasty Chinese artillery officer Jiao Yu adds the preface to his classic book on gunpowder warfare, the Huolongjing.
- The Black Death sweeps England for a final time, in a 60-year period.

== Births ==
- January 6 – Joan of Arc, French soldier and patron saint of France (tradition holds that she was born on the Feast of the Epiphany, but there is no documentary evidence) (d. 1431)
- January 26 – William IV, Lord of Egmont, IJsselstein, Schoonderwoerd and Haastrecht and Stadtholder of Guelders (d. 1483)
- April 22 – Reinhard III, Count of Hanau (1451–1452) (d. 1452)
- June 5 – Ludovico III Gonzaga, Marquis of Mantua (d. 1478)
- August 22 – Frederick II, Elector of Saxony and Margrave of Meissen (1428–1464) and Landgrave of Thuringia (1440–1445) (d. 1464)
- November 17 – Zanobi Strozzi, Italian painter (d. 1468)
- December 8 – Astorre II Manfredi, Italian noble (d. 1468)

== Deaths ==
- March – Albrekt of Mecklenburg, king of Sweden 1364–1389 (b. 1336)
- April 2 – Ruy Gonzáles de Clavijo, Castilian traveller and writer
- May 16 – Gian Maria Visconti, Duke of Milan
- August 6 – Margherita of Durazzo, Queen consort of Charles III of Naples (b. 1347)
- September 14 – Ingegerd Knutsdotter, Swedish abbess (b. 1356)
- October 28 – Margaret I of Denmark, queen regnant of Denmark of Norway since 1387 and of Sweden since 1389 (b. 1353)
- date unknown – Ignatius Abraham bar Garib, Syriac Orthodox Patriarch of Mardin
- date unknown – Jalal ad-Din khan, khan of the Golden Horde
