= Battle of Kremmen Levee (1412) =

1332 battle of Pomeranian–Brandenburgish War

Battle of Kremmer Levee
- Part of Uckermark War
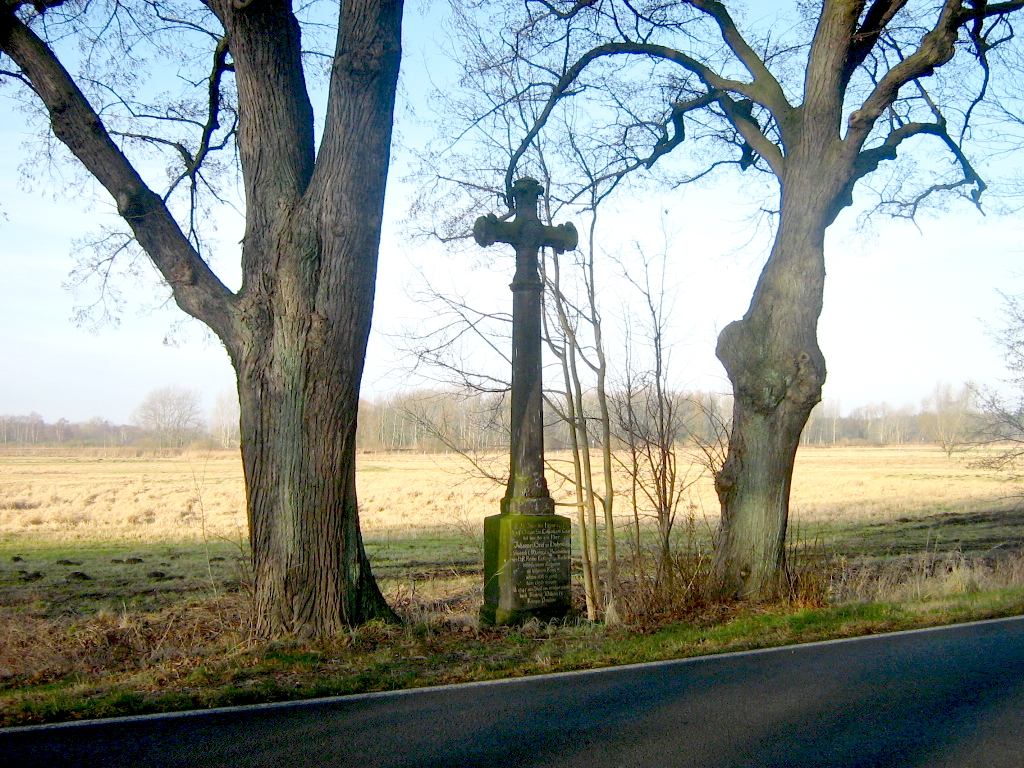
- The cross commemorating the battle at the Kremmer Levee.
Date	24 October 1412
Location	Kremmer Levee, near Kremmen, Brandenburg
Result	Stettin victory

Belligerents
Pomerania-Stettin	Margraviate of Brandenburg

Commanders and leaders
Casimir V Otto I Kaspar Gans	Johannes von Hohenlohe †; Kraft von Lentersheim † Philipp von Utenhofen †

Battle of Kremmer Levee (Note: German: Schlacht am Kremmer Damm; Polish: bitwa pod Kremmer Damm, bitwa na Kremskiej Grobli) took place during Uckermark War, on 24 October 1412, on the Kremmer Levee, near the village of Kremmen. It was fought by forces of Pomerania-Stettin against the Margraviate of Brandenburg.

== Background ==
Between 1409 and 1411, duke Swantibor III, ruler of Pomerania-Stettin, had been appointed the margrave of Mittelmark. In 1411, Sigismund, the margrave of Branderburg, had appointed Frederick I, as the new margrave of Mittelmark. However, Swantibor had never recognized the decision and Fredrick's claim to the area, insisting that he was the rightful ruler. In 1412, Swantibor III had been recognized by part of the Mittlemark nobility, as their sovereign ruler. In October 1412, Pomerania-Stettin had attacked the Mittelmark, in the Margraviate of Brandenburg. Brandenburg had been allied with Pomerania-Wolgast, and used a mercenary knight army from Franconia. Stettin forces were commanded by dukes Casimir V and Otto II, sons of Swantibor III, as well as by Kaspar Gans.

== The battle ==
On 24 October 1412, both sides had fought in the battle on the Kremmer Levee, over the flooded flatlands near the village of Kremmer. The Franconian forces of Brandenburg were commanded by Johannes von Hohenlohe, Kraft von Lentersheim, and Philipp von Utenhofen. All three of them died in the battle, being pushed from the levee and drowning in the water. The battle was won by Stettin forces.

== After the battle ==
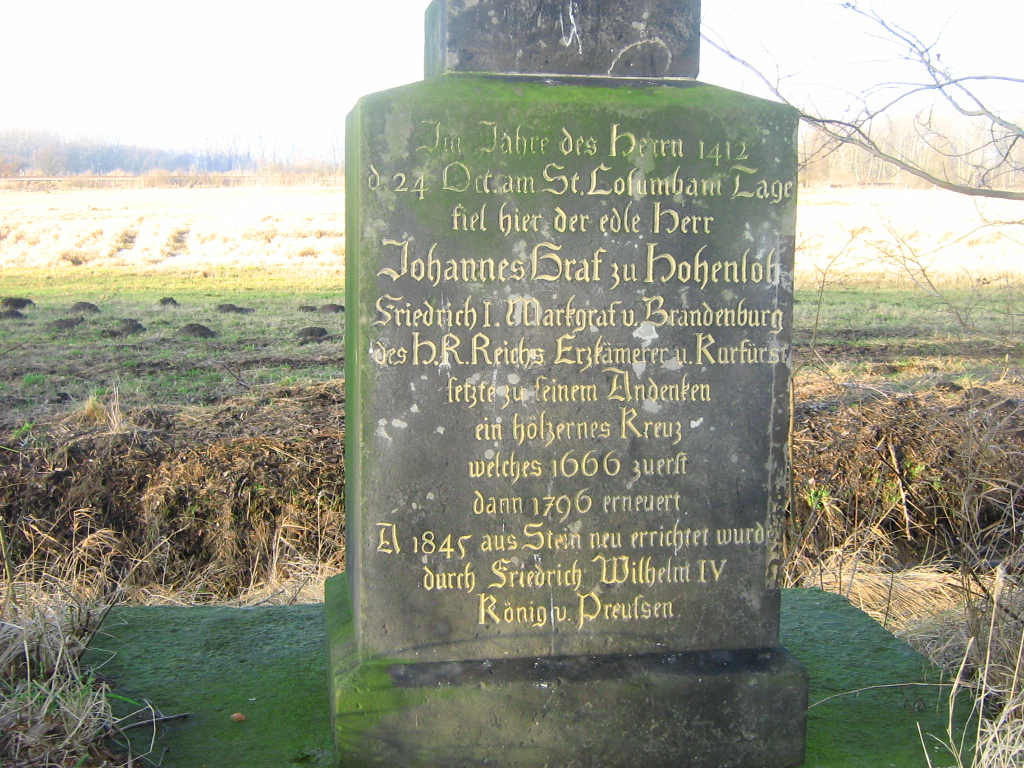
The inscription at the bottom of the metal cross at Kremmer Levee commemorating the battle.

In 1414, Brandenburg had conquered Uckermark. On 16 December 1415, when Frederick I and the dukes of Wolgast, had signed a treaty with the dukes of Stettin, ending the war.

Philipp von Utenhoven and count Johannes von Hohenlohe were buried in Franziskaner-Klosterkirche church in Berlin. Frederick I, close friend of Johannes, had ordered inhabitants of Kremmer to build a woden cross in the place of his death. It was restored in 1660, and in 1845, from the initiative of Frederick William IV of Prussia, the woden cross has been replaced with a new metal one, which stands near the road to this day.

== Citations ==
=== Bibliography ===
- Edward Schröder, Die Schlacht am Kremmer Damm?
- Edward Rymar, Jedna bitwa pomorsko-brandenburska na Kremskiej Grobli (w 1412 r.) i bitwa Barnima III księcia szczecińskiego z Wedlami (w 1332 r.) in: Kaci, święci, templariusze, Błażej Śliwiński (redictor), Studia z Dziejów Średniowiecza nr 14
- E. Rymar, Rodowód książąt pomorskich
- K. Kozłowski, J. Podralski, Gryfici. Książęta Pomorza Zachodniego
- Edward Rymar, Wojny i spory pomorsko-brandenburskie w XV-XVI w.
- J. W. Szymański, Książęcy ród Gryfitów
