= Kayı, İdil =

Village in Şırnak Province, Turkey

Kayı
- Village
- Location within Turkey
- Coordinates: 37.374°N 41.783°E
- Country: Turkey
- Province: Şırnak
- District: İdil
- Population (2021): 169
- Time zone: UTC+3 (TRT)

Kayı (Kurdish: Hêdil, Syriac: ܚܕܠ, romanized: Ḥidl) (Note: Alternatively transliterated as Ḥadl, Hedel, Hedil, Hidel, Hidil, or Hodlé.) is a village in the İdil District of Şırnak Province in Turkey. The village is populated by Kurds of the Omerkan tribe and had a population of 169 in 2021. It is located in the historic region of Tur Abdin.

== History ==
Ḥidl (today called Kayı) is identified with the ancient town of Andulu, located in the Izalla region. The village was historically inhabited by adherents of the Church of the East. Ignatius Behnam Hadloyo, Syriac Orthodox patriarch of Antioch (r. 1445–1454), was born at Ḥidl. The Church of Mar Bassus and Susan at Ḥidl was taken over by the Syriac Orthodox Church as a result of the villagers' conversion prior to the 18th century.

In 1914, the village was populated by 100 Syriacs, according to the Assyro-Chaldean delegation to the Paris Peace Conference. There were 20 or 22 Syriac families at Ḥidl in 1915. Amidst the Sayfo, the villagers took refuge at Azakh and remained there until the end of the massacres. By 1987, there were no remaining Syriacs.

== Bibliography ==
- Al-Jeloo, Nicholas (2015). "Transferrable Religious Heritage: Church Buildings in Northern Mesopotamia". Le patrimoine architectural de l’Église orthodoxe d’Antioche: Perspectives comparatives avec les autres groupes religieux du Moyen-Orient et des régions limitrophes. Publications of the University of Balamand. pp. 111–127.
- Barsoum, Ephrem (2003). The Scattered Pearls: A History of Syriac Literature and Sciences. Translated by Matti Moosa (2nd ed.). Gorgias Press.
- Barsoum, Aphrem (2008). The History of Tur Abdin. Translated by Matti Moosa. Gorgias Press.
- Baz, Ibrahim (2016). Şırnak aşiretleri ve kültürü (in Turkish). ISBN 9786058849631.
- Courtois, Sébastien de (2004). The Forgotten Genocide: Eastern Christians, The Last Arameans. Translated by Vincent Aurora. Gorgias Press.
- Gaunt, David (2006). Massacres, Resistance, Protectors: Muslim-Christian Relations in Eastern Anatolia during World War I. Gorgias Press.
- Jongerden, Joost; Verheij, Jelle, eds. (2012). Social Relations in Ottoman Diyarbekir, 1870-1915. Brill.
- Radner, Karen (2006). "How to reach the Upper Tigris: The route through the Tur Abdin" (PDF). State Archives of Assyria Bulletin. 15: 273–305.
- Sinclair, T. A. (1989). Eastern Turkey: An Architectural and Archaeological Survey. Vol. III. London: The Pindar Press.
- Tan, Altan (2018). Turabidin'den Berriye'ye. Aşiretler - Dinler - Diller - Kültürler (in Turkish). Pak Ajans Yayincilik Turizm Ve Diş Ticaret Limited şirketi. ISBN 9789944360944.
