= Uckermark War (1412–1415) =

Date	October 1412 – 16 December 1415
Location	Uckermark, Brandenburg
Result	Brandenburg victory; Anexiation of Uckermark into the Margraviate of Brandenburg

Belligerents
Pomerania-Stettin	Margraviate of Brandenburg Pomerania-Wolgast

Commanders and leaders
Otto II Casimir V	Frederick I Johannes von Hohenlohe †

Uckermark War (Note: Polish: Wojna wkrzańska) was a military conflict fought in Uckermark and Mittelmark in Brandenburg, between October 1412 and 16 December 1415. It was fought by Pomerania-Stettin against the Margraviate of Brandenburg and Pomerania-Wolgast. The war was won by Brandenburg, with them annexing Uckermark.

== The war ==
Between 1409 and 1411, duke Swantibor III, ruler of Pomerania-Stettin, had been appointed the margrave of Mittelmark. In 1411, Sigismund, the margrave of Branderburg, had appointed Frederick I, as the new margrave of Mittelmark. However, Swantibor had never recognized the decision and Fredrick's claim to the area, insisting that he was the rightful ruler. In 1412, Swantibor III had been recognized by part of the Mittlemark nobility, as their sovereign ruler. In October 1412, Pomerania-Stettin had attacked the Mittelmark, in the Margraviate of Brandenburg. Brandenburg had been allied with Pomerania-Wolgast, and used a mercenary knight army from Franconia. Stettin forces were commanded by dukes Casimir V and Otto II, sons of Swantibor III, as well as by Kaspar Gans.

On 24 October 1412, both sides had fought in the battle on the Kremmer Levee, over the flooded flatlands near the village of Kremmer. The Franconian forces of Brandenburg were commanded by Johannes von Hohenlohe, Kraft von Lentersheim, and Philipp von Utenhofen. All three of them died in the battle, being pushed from the levee and drowning in the water. The battle was won by Stettin forces.

In 1414, Brandenburg had conquered Uckermark. On 16 December 1415, when Frederick I and the dukes of Wolgast, had signed a treaty with the dukes of Stettin, ending the war.

== Notable battles ==
- Battle of Kremmer Levee

== Citations ==
=== Bibliography ===
- Edward Rymar, Wojny i spory pomorsko-brandenburskie w XV-XVI w. Wydawnictwo Inforeditions. Zabrze 2012.
- Edward Rymar, Rodowód książąt pomorskich
- K. Kozłowski, J. Podralski, Gryfici. Książęta Pomorza Zachodniego
- Edward Schröder, Die Schlacht am Kremmer Damm?
- Edward Rymar, Jedna bitwa pomorsko-brandenburska na Kremskiej Grobli (w 1412 r.) i bitwa Barnima III księcia szczecińskiego z Wedlami (w 1332 r.) in: Kaci, święci, templariusze, Błażej Śliwiński (redictor), Studia z Dziejów Średniowiecza nr 14
