= Basil IV Simon =

90th Patriarch of Syriac Orthodox Church of Antioch 1421–1444

- Syriac Orthodox Patriarch of Antioch and All the East
- Church: Syriac Orthodox Church
- See: Antioch
- Installed: 1421/1422
- Term ended: 1444/1445
- Predecessor: Philoxenus II
- Successor: Ignatius Behnam Hadloyo

Personal details
- Died: 1444/1445

Basil IV Simon (Syriac: Shemʿūn Manʿamoyo) (Note: Simon is counted as either Basil IV, or Basil V.) was the Patriarch of Antioch and head of the Syriac Orthodox Church from 1421/1422 until his death in 1444/1445.

== Biography ==
Simon was the son of Zuwayra from the village of Beth Man‘am in Tur Abdin and was educated at the monastery of Qartmin. He had become bishop of Gargar by 1387 and was later appointed as archbishop of Jerusalem with the name Basil.

Upon the death of patriarch Philoxenus II in 1421, Simon met with the Coptic Pope Gabriel V of Alexandria to request that he be consecrated as Philoxenus' successor as patriarch of Antioch. Simon argued that Gabriel's involvement was necessary as there were too few remaining bishops of his own church and Islamic persecution prevented them from holding a synod to elect a new patriarch.

In spite of initial hesitation, Gabriel acquiesced and thus he and two Coptic bishops and one Syriac bishop consecrated Simon at Cairo at the church of Saint Mercurius and formally enthroned him at the church of the Virgin Mary in 1421 or 1422. (Note: Simon's accession is placed either in 1421, or in 1422.) The priest Abu l-Faraj, who would later succeed Gabriel as Pope John XI of Alexandria in 1427, also participated in Simon's consecration at the church of Saint Mercurius.

Simon later returned to Egypt in need of the chrism and so he, Pope John, and the archbishop of Jerusalem performed the ceremony to prepare the chrism together during the Holy Week of 1430 at the Hanging Church at Cairo. He served as patriarch of Antioch until his death in 1444 or 1445.

== Bibliography ==
- Barsoum, Aphrem (2008). The History of Tur Abdin. Translated by Matti Moosa. Gorgias Press.
- Burleson, Samuel; Van Rompay, Lucas (2011). "List of Patriarchs: II. The Syriac Orthodox Church and its Uniate continuations". In Sebastian P. Brock; Aaron M. Butts; George A. Kiraz; Lucas Van Rompay (eds.). Gorgias Encyclopedic Dictionary of the Syriac Heritage: Electronic Edition. Gorgias Press.
- Carlson, Thomas A. (2018). Christianity in Fifteenth-Century Iraq. Cambridge University Press.
- Swanson, Mark N. (2010). The Coptic Papacy in Islamic Egypt (641-1517). American University in Cairo Press.
- Wilmshurst, David (2019). "West Syrian patriarchs and maphrians". In Daniel King (ed.). The Syriac World. Routledge. pp. 806–813.

Preceded by Philoxenus II	Syriac Orthodox Patriarch of Antioch; 1421/1422–1444/1445	Succeeded by Ignatius Behnam Hadloyo
