= Dioscorus Behnam Shatti =

Mapherian of the Syriac Orthodox Church in the East (1415 - 1417)

- Syriac Orthodox Maphrian of the East
- Church: Syriac Orthodox Church
- Installed: 1415
- Term ended: 1417
- Predecessor: Basil Behnam I
- Successor: Basil Barsawmo II

Personal details
- Died: 21 July 1417

Dioscorus Behnam Shatti, also known as Dioscorus Behnam Arboyo, was the Syriac Orthodox Maphrian of the East from 1415 until his death in 1417. (Note: He is counted as either Dioscorus II or Behnam II.)

== Biography ==
Behnam was from the village of Arbo in Tur Abdin and was the son of Simon from the Zuqaqi family. He was ordained as metropolitan bishop of Beth Risha and Mar Malke Monastery by Ignatius Yeshu I, patriarch of Tur Abdin, in 1396. According to the account of the priest Addai of Basibrina in c. 1500 appended to the Chronography of Bar Hebraeus, Behnam saved the villages of Arbo and Beth Risha during Timur's invasion in 1401 (AG 1712) after he had appealed directly to Timur's son Mīrānshāh to spare his village and had received a kerchief as a sign of his decision. He ordained Ignatius Behnam Hadloyo as patriarch of Mardin in 1412. Behnam succeeded Ignatius Behnam Hadloyo as maphrian in 1415 and served until his death on 21 July 1417 at Qaraqosh. He was buried at the Mar Behnam Monastery.

== Bibliography ==
- Barsoum, Aphrem (2008a). History of the Za'faran Monastery. Translated by Matti Moosa. Gorgias Press.
- Barsoum, Aphrem (2008b). The History of Tur Abdin. Translated by Matti Moosa. Gorgias Press.
- Carlson, Thomas A. (2018). Christianity in Fifteenth-Century Iraq (PDF). Cambridge University Press.
- Ignatius Jacob III (2008). History of the Monastery of Saint Matthew in Mosul. Translated by Matti Moosa. Gorgias Press.
- Wilmshurst, David (2019). "West Syrian patriarchs and maphrians". In Daniel King (ed.). The Syriac World. Routledge. pp. 806–813.

Preceded by Basil Behnam I	Syriac Orthodox Maphrian of the East; 1415–1417	Succeeded by Basil Barsawmo II
