= Ignatius Abraham bar Gharib =

Syriac Orthodox Patriarch of Mardin

- Syriac Orthodox Patriarch of Mardin
- Church: Syriac Orthodox Church
- See: Mardin
- Installed: 1381/1382
- Term ended: 1412
- Predecessor: Ignatius Shahab
- Successor: Ignatius Behnam Hadloyo

Personal details
- Died: 1412

Ignatius Abraham bar Gharib (Syriac: ܐܒܪܗܡ ܒܪ ܓܪܝܒ, Arabic: البطريرك ابرهيم بن غريب) (Note: He is counted as either Abraham II, Ignatius II, Ignatius IV, or Ignatius VIII. Alternatively transliterated as bar Garībh.) was the Syriac Orthodox Patriarch of Mardin from 1381 or 1382 until his death in 1412.

== Biography ==
Abraham was the son of Quryaqos, son of Gharīb of Amid, and had a brother named Joseph, who would later become metropolitan bishop of Amid. He became a monk at the monastery of Saint Ananias and was ordained as a priest before 1355. He was appointed as his brother Joseph's successor as metropolitan bishop of Amid in c. 1375 with the name Cyril. Abraham was elected as patriarch of Mardin at a synod at Amid in 1381 or 1382, upon which he assumed the name Ignatius. (Note: Abraham's accession is placed either in 1381, or in 1382.)

Soon after his ascension to the patriarchal office, Abraham designated a brother as his successor as patriarch, according to the anonymous continuator of the Ecclesiastical History of Bar Hebraeus. In doing so, he attempted to establish his own familial succession in imitation of the preceding patriarchs of Mardin, Ignatius Shahab (r. 1365/1366–1381) and Ignatius Ismail (r. 1333–1365/1366), both of whom were nephews of their predecessor. This was unsuccessful, however, as Abraham's brother would predecease him.

In 1396, Timur's attack on Mardin resulted in damage to the nearby monastery of Saint Ananias, including the destruction of the wall, cells, and door of the sanctuary. Abraham promptly set about raising funds to restore the monastery through gathering donations and the sale of the monastery's furniture, manuscripts, and vessels. Eventually, he spent 50,000 coins of an unknown currency on rebuilding the monastery, at which time he may have also transferred the relics of Saint Eugene and others there. Abraham served as patriarch of Mardin until his death in 1412 and was buried in the mausoleum of the monastery of Saint Ananias.

== Works ==
Abraham wrote a book of propitiatory prayers (Syriac: ḥusoyo) for the morning service of Lazarus Saturday, and compiled a liturgy of anaphoras of Church Fathers, including a 13-page anaphora written by his brother Joseph.

== Bibliography ==
- Barsoum, Aphrem (2003). The Scattered Pearls: A History of Syriac Literature and Sciences. Translated by Matti Moosa (2nd ed.). Gorgias Press.
- Barsoum, Aphrem (2008). History of the Za'faran Monastery. Translated by Matti Moosa. Gorgias Press.
- Burleson, Samuel; Van Rompay, Lucas (2011). "List of Patriarchs: II. The Syriac Orthodox Church and its Uniate continuations". In Sebastian P. Brock; Aaron M. Butts; George A. Kiraz; Lucas Van Rompay (eds.). Gorgias Encyclopedic Dictionary of the Syriac Heritage: Electronic Edition. Gorgias Press.
- Carlson, Thomas A. (2018). Christianity in Fifteenth-Century Iraq. Cambridge University Press.
- Wilmshurst, David (2019). "West Syrian patriarchs and maphrians". In Daniel King (ed.). The Syriac World. Routledge. pp. 806–813.

Preceded by Ignatius Shahab	Syriac Orthodox Patriarch of Mardin; 1381/1382–1412	Succeeded by Ignatius Behnam Hadloyo
