= 1468 =

1468 in various calendars
- Gregorian calendar: 1468; MCDLXVIII
- Ab urbe condita: 2221
- Armenian calendar: 917; ԹՎ ՋԺԷ
- Assyrian calendar: 6218
- Balinese saka calendar: 1389–1390
- Bengali calendar: 874–875
- Berber calendar: 2418
- English Regnal year: 7 Edw. 4 – 8 Edw. 4
- Buddhist calendar: 2012
- Burmese calendar: 830
- Byzantine calendar: 6976–6977
- Chinese calendar: 丁亥年 (Fire Pig); 4165 or 3958 — to — 戊子年 (Earth Rat); 4166 or 3959
- Coptic calendar: 1184–1185
- Discordian calendar: 2634
- Ethiopian calendar: 1460–1461
- Hebrew calendar: 5228–5229
- Hindu calendars
- Vikram Samvat: 1524–1525
- Shaka Samvat: 1389–1390
- Kali Yuga: 4568–4569
- Holocene calendar: 11468
- Igbo calendar: 468–469
- Iranian calendar: 846–847
- Islamic calendar: 872–873
- Japanese calendar: Ōnin 2 (応仁２年)
- Javanese calendar: 1384–1385
- Julian calendar: 1468; MCDLXVIII
- Korean calendar: 3801
- Minguo calendar: 444 before ROC 民前444年
- Nanakshahi calendar: 0
- Thai solar calendar: 2010–2011
- Tibetan calendar: མེ་མོ་ཕག་ལོ་ (female Fire-Boar); 1594 or 1213 or 441 — to — ས་ཕོ་བྱི་བ་ལོ་ (male Earth-Rat); 1595 or 1214 or 442

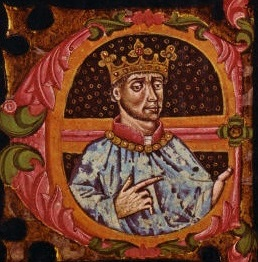
Henry IV of Castile

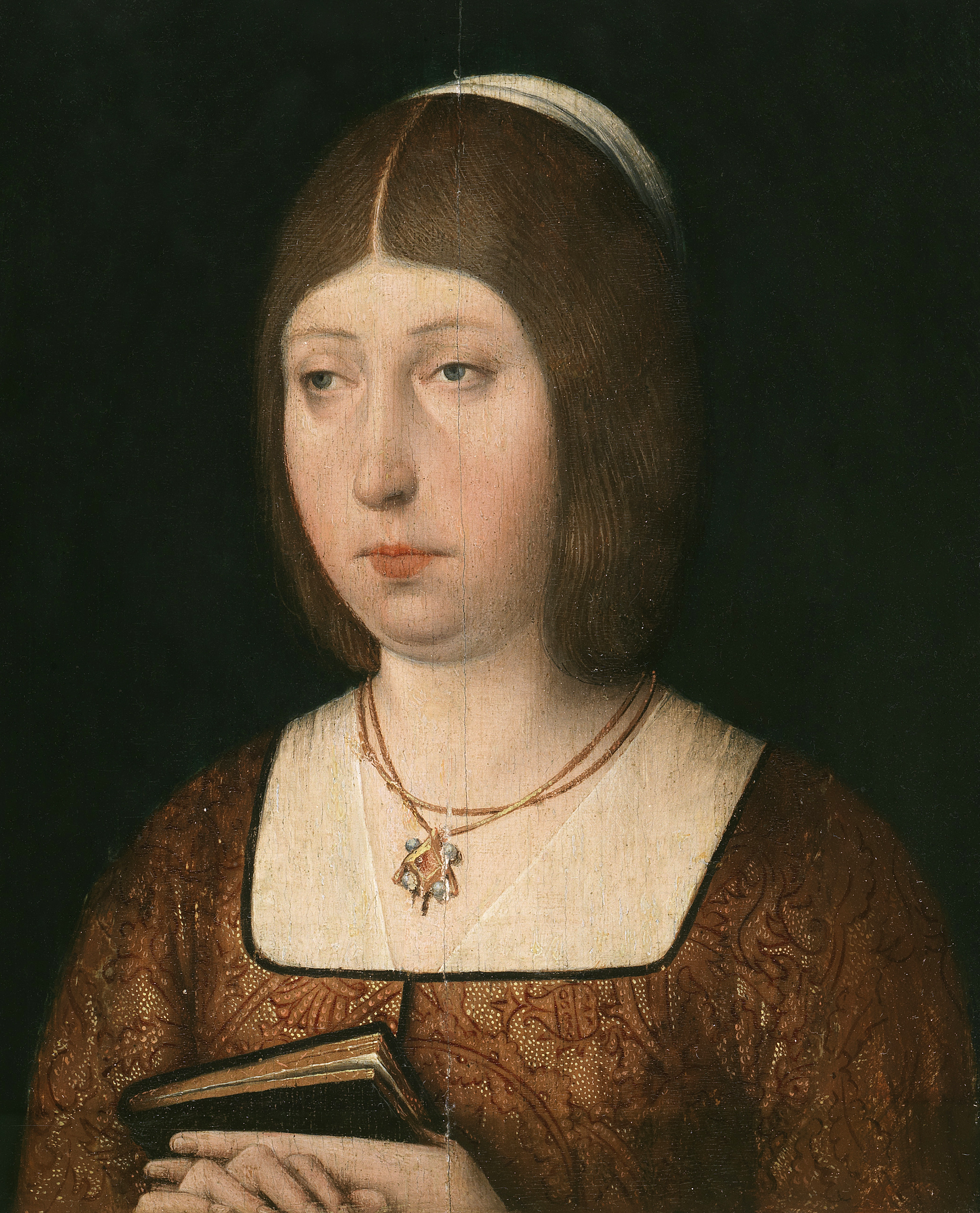
Isabella I of Castile

September 19: King Enrique IV of Castile signs the Treaty of the Bulls of Guisando with his younger half-sister, designating her as the heiress to the throne.

Year 1468 (MCDLXVIII) was a leap year starting on Friday of the Julian calendar.

== Events ==
=== January–March ===
- January 31 – Abu Al-Nasr Sayf ad-Din Al-Ashraf Qaitbay (generally referred to as "Qaitbay") is installed by Mamluk Egyptian nobles as the new Sultan of Egypt and Syria, the day after the Sultan Timurbugha had been removed after less than two months on the throne.
- February 15 – The Earl of Desmond, Thomas FitzGerald, until recently the Kingdom of England's Lord Deputy of Ireland, is beheaded on orders of his successor, John Tiptoft, shortly after being arrested on accusations of treason against the Crown, then quickly tried and convicted in a show trial.
- February 16 – A "marriage treaty" is signed between representatives of the Kingdom of England and the Duchy of Burgundy, providing for the marriage of King Edward IV's sister, Margaret of York, to Charles the Bold, Duke of Burgundy.
- March 14 – King Edward IV ratifies the treaty permitting his sister to marry the Duke of Burgundy
- March 31 – King Matyas of Hungary issues a declaration of war against King Jiri of Bohemia, starting a war that will last 10 years.

=== April–June ===
- April 1 – King Louis XI summons a meeting of France's parliament, the Estates-General, and obtains approval of all concessions he had previously made to the Kingdom of England, including those with reference to Normandy.
- April 25 – At Stirling in Scotland, the Lord Boyd, the regent for King James III, enters an agreement for joint rule with the members of his council (the bishops of Glasgow and of Aberdeen, the earls of Argyll and of Arran, the provost of Lincluden, and Archibald Whitelaw) to co-operate in the governing of Scotland.
- May 30 – After invading Syria, Shah Suwar, the Ottoman Governor of Dulkadir, triumphs in battle over various Mamluk Syrian governors and emirs and captures Kulaksiz. The Governor of Damascus, Uzbek Bey, is seriously wounded but manages to escape.
- June 7 – King Edward IV of England gives royal assent to numerous laws passed by the English Parliament, including the Cloths Act, the Liveries Act and the Sheriffs Act.

=== July–September ===
- July 24 – (5th waxing of Wagaung, 830 ME) At Pyay (now in Myanmar) Thihathura of Ava becomes the new Burmese King of Ava upon the death of his father, Narapati I of Ava.
- July 30 – Catherine Cornaro is married by proxy to James II of Cyprus, beginning the Venetian conquest of Cyprus.
- August 14 – The Lancastrians surrender Harlech Castle to King Edward IV after a seven-year siege.
- August 26 – Baeda Maryam succeeds his father Zara Yaqob, as Emperor of Ethiopia.
- September 8 – The Orkney Islands are pledged to Scotland by King Christian I of Kingdom of Norway in consideration of an agreement for the marriage of 16-year-old King James III of Scotland to Princess Margrete, King Christian's daughter, with the islands pledged as security against the payment of the dowry. As the money is never paid, the connection with the crown of Scotland becomes perpetual.
- September 9 – At Hanseong, Prince Yi Hwang of the Joseon dynasty becomes the new King of Korea, taking the regnal name Yejong, upon the death of his father, King Sejo.
- September 18 – The Great Council of the Republic of Venice curbs the power of the Council of Ten through legislation restricting them to acting on emergency matters.
- September 19 – In the Kingdom of Castile in Spain, near El Tiemblo, the "Treaty of the Bulls of Guisando" (Tratado de los Toros de Guisando) is signed between King Enrique IV the Impotent and his half-sister, Princess Isabella. The treaty, executed at the ancient sculpture of bulls near Ávila, designates Isabella as heiress to the throne of Castile and León. She will become the Queen upon Enrique's death six years later.

=== October–December ===
- October 14 – The Treaty of Péronne is signed by Charles the Bold, Duke of Burgundy, and Louis XI of France.
- October 30 – Troops of Charles the Bold conduct the Sack of Liège.
- November 20 – The Hanseatic warship Hanneke Vrome capsizes and sinks off of the coast of Finland, killing its estimated 180 passengers and crew, along with a valuable cargo including 10,000 Rheingulden coins, equivalent to at least 34,000 kilograms (75,000 lb) of gold. The ship had been sailing between the Hanseatic cities of Lübeck (in Germany) and Reval (now Tallinn, capital of Estonia) when it ran into a gale.
- December 9 – In the course of the "Boeckler War" in the Duchy of Bavaria-Munich, the troops of Duke Albert IV begin the siege of Weissenstein Castle in reprisal for the rebellion of Lord Eberwein von Degenburg. The troops, commanded by Georg of Lerchenfeld capture the castle before Christmas and burn it to the ground.

=== Date unknown ===
- Fire breaks out at Metz Cathedral in France.
- Sonni Ali, king of the Songhai Empire, takes power over Timbuktu.

== Births ==
- February 29 – Pope Paul III (d. 1549)
- March 28 – Charles I, Duke of Savoy (d. 1490)
- April 27 – Frederick Jagiellon, Primate of Poland (d. 1503)
- May 31 – Philip, Prince of Anhalt-Köthen, German prince (d. 1500)
- June 30 – John, Elector of Saxony (1525–1532) (d. 1532)
- July 24 – Catherine of Saxony, Archduchess of Austria (d. 1524)
- August 3 – Albert I, Duke of Münsterberg-Oels, Count of Kladsko (d. 1511)
- August 26 – Bernardo de' Rossi, Italian bishop (d. 1527)
- December 21 – William Conyers, 1st Baron Conyers, English baron (d. 1524)
- date unknown
  - Marino Ascanio Caracciolo, Italian cardinal (d. 1538)
  - Mir Chakar Khan Rind, Baloch chieftain (d. 1565)
  - Juan de Zumárraga, Spanish Franciscan prelate and first bishop of Mexico (d. 1548)
- probable – Alonso de Ojeda, Spanish conquistador and explorer (d. 1515)

== Deaths ==
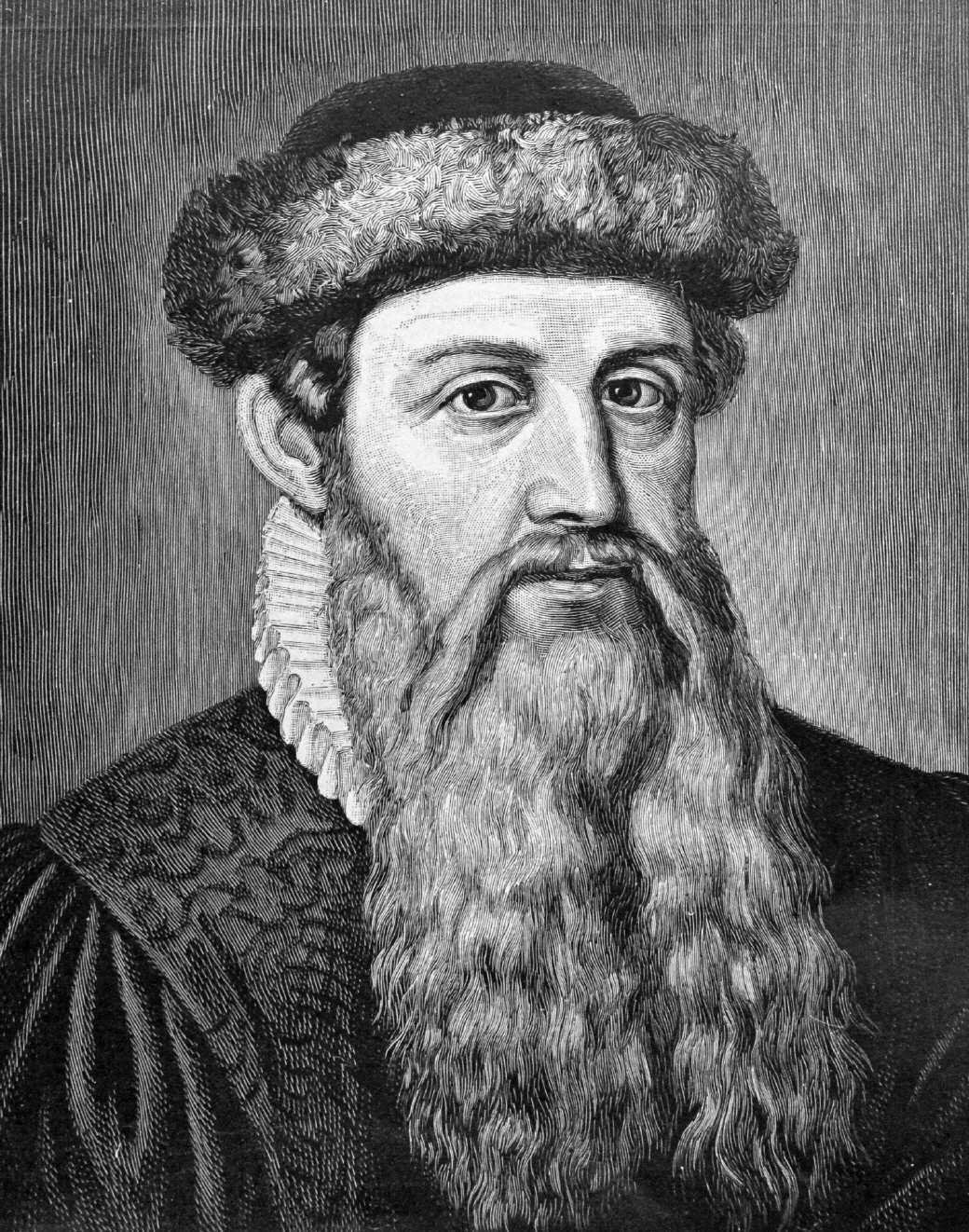
Johannes Gutenberg

- February 3 – Johannes Gutenberg, inventor of printing press with replaceable letters (b. c.1398)
- March 12 – Astorre II Manfredi, Italian noble (b. 1412)
- September 23 – Sejo of Joseon, King of Joseon (b. 1417)
- June 10 – Idris Imad al-Din, supreme leader of Tayyibi Isma'ilism, scholar and historian (b. 1392)
- June 14 – Margaret Beauchamp, countess of Shrewsbury
- June 30 – Lady Eleanor Talbot, English noblewoman
- July 5 – Alfonso, Prince of Asturias (b. 1453)
- September 26 – Juan de Torquemada, Spanish Catholic cardinal (b. 1388)
- October 7 – Sigismondo Pandolfo Malatesta, lord of Rimini (b. 1417)
- October 28 – Bianca Maria Visconti, Duchess of Milan (b. 1425)
- November 24 – Jean de Dunois, French soldier (b. 1402)
- December 6 – Zanobi Strozzi, Italian painter (b. 1412)
- date unknown
  - Joanot Martorell, Spanish writer (b. 1419)
  - Francesco Squarcione, Italian artist (b. ca. 1395)
  - Zara Yaqob, Emperor of Ethiopia (b. 1399)
  - Pomellina Fregoso, Monegaque regent (b. 1388
