= Heinrich von Dissen =

German Carthusian theologian and writer

Heinrich von Dissen (born 18 October 1415, at Osnabrück in Westphalia; died at Cologne, 26 November 1484) was a German Carthusian theologian and writer.

== Life ==
After studying philosophy and theology at Cologne under Heinrich von Gorinchem (Gorkum), a celebrated theologian of the 15th century and vice-chancellor of the university, Heinrich von Dissen became a monk at the Carthusian monastery in Cologne. He took his solemn vows 14 January 1437 and remained at the monastery for the rest of his life. He labored diligently, reading, copying many books for the library of the monastery, and composing numerous works. He was appointed subprior 23 March 1457 and continued in that office until his death.

== Works ==
His literary productions, all in Latin, comprise commentaries on the Psalms, the Apocalypse, The Gospels of the Sundays and Festivals, the Creed of St. Athanasius, and the Lord's Prayer. He also produced a great number of sermons and homilies, treatises, and devotional writings, such as "De Sacerdotii dignitate", "De multiplici bonorum verecundia", "Quo pacto hæreticorum fraudes deprehendi queant", "Expositio in totum Missale", "Expositio Antiphonarii", "Consolationes in Cantica Canticorum", "De XIII mansionibus", etc.
