= Ignatius Behnam Hadloyo =

91st Patriarch of Syriac Orthodox Church of Antioch (1445–1454)

- Syriac Orthodox Patriarch of Antioch and All the East
- Church: Syriac Orthodox Church
- See: Antioch
- Installed: 1445
- Term ended: 1454
- Predecessor: Basil IV Simon
- Successor: Ignatius Khalaf Maʿdnoyo

Personal details
- Born: Ḥadl
- Died: 10 December 1454

Ignatius Behnam Hadloyo (Syriac: ܦܛܪܝܪܟܐ ܒܗܢܡ ܚܕܠܝܐ, Arabic: البطريرك بهنام الحدلي) (Note: He is counted as either Ignatius V, or Ignatius IX. Alternatively transliterated as Ḥedloyo.) was the Patriarch of Antioch and head of the Syriac Orthodox Church from 1445 until his death in 1454.

== Biography ==
Behnam was born at Ḥadl in Tur Abdin in the 14th century, and was the son of John of the Habbo Kanni family, who were originally from Bartella in the Nineveh Plains. Other prominent members of the family include the deacon and physician Behnam (d. 1293), son of the priest Mubarak, and the writer Abu Nasr, abbot of the monastery of Saint Matthew (fl. 1260–1290). He was educated by Rabban Jacob the Stylite.

He became a monk at the monastery of Qartmin and was later ordained as a priest. Behnam was consecrated as maphrian in 1404, and assumed the name Basil. As maphrian, he may have resided at the monastery of Saint Matthew near Mosul for the entirety of the duration of his episcopate or only for intervals. He was elected as the successor of Ignatius Abraham bar Gharib as patriarch of Mardin at a synod at the monastery of Saint Ananias and was consecrated on 24 June or July 1412 by Dioscorus Behnam Shatti, archbishop of the monastery of Saint Malke, upon which he assumed the name Ignatius. (Note: According to the Egyptian scholar Samir Khalil Samir, Behnam was consecrated by the Coptic Pope Gabriel V of Alexandria at Cairo in Egypt, however, this is refuted by the historian Mark N. Swanson who argues Samir confuses Behnam with Basil IV Simon.)

As patriarch, Behnam engaged with the Catholic Church and despatched Abdallah, archbishop of Edessa, as his representative to the Council of Florence. It is suggested that this was likely after Behnam had received an invitation from a delegation of Franciscan envoys on behalf of Pope Eugene IV. Upon the success of negotiations between Abdallah and a number of cardinals and theologians, union between the two churches was agreed and celebrated at the Lateran Palace at Rome on 30 September 1444 with the declaration of the papal bull Multa et Admirabilia.

After the death of the Patriarch Basil IV Simon in 1445, Behnam travelled to Jerusalem to prevent the election of a successor so to heal the schism between the rival patriarchates of Antioch and Mardin that had endured since 1293. He successfully convinced the bishops formerly under Basil IV to acclaim him as patriarch of Antioch, thus restoring unity to the church under his authority. Behnam visited Jerusalem and the monastery of Saint Thomas with a group of bishops, priests, monks, and deacons in 1450. In the aftermath of the fall of Constantinople to the Ottoman Empire in 1453, relations with the Catholic Church became untenable, and consequently Behnam's union as signed in 1444 was renounced. He served as patriarch of Antioch until his death on 10 December 1454, and was buried at the monastery of Saint Ananias. As patriarch, Behnam ordained two maphrians and ten bishops.

== Works ==
Behnam wrote ten books of propitiatory prayers (pl. Syriac: ḥusoye), of which, three were for Lent, four for the festivals of the saints Asya, Abhai, Barsohde, and Saba, whilst others were on the Presentation of Jesus at the Temple and the morning of the festival of our Lady over the crops. He also wrote an anaphora and prepared a compilation of selections from Daniel of Salah's commentary on the Psalms, dated 1425 (ms. Jerusalem, St. Mark 14). In addition, Behnam wrote eleven poems.

== Bibliography ==
- Barsoum, Ephrem (2003). The Scattered Pearls: A History of Syriac Literature and Sciences. Translated by Matti Moosa (2nd ed.). Gorgias Press.
- Barsoum, Aphrem (2008a). History of the Za'faran Monastery. Translated by Matti Moosa. Gorgias Press.
- Barsoum, Aphrem (2008b). The History of Tur Abdin. Translated by Matti Moosa. Gorgias Press.
- Barsoum, Aphrem (2009). The Collected Historical Essays of Aphram I Barsoum. Vol. 1. Translated by Matti Moosa. Gorgias Press.
- Bcheiry, Iskandar (2013). The Account of the Syriac Orthodox Patriarch Yūḥanun Bar Šay Allāh (1483–1492): The Syriac Manuscript of Cambridge: DD.3.8(1). Gorgias Press.
- Burleson, Samuel; Van Rompay, Lucas (2011). "List of Patriarchs: II. The Syriac Orthodox Church and its Uniate continuations". In Sebastian P. Brock; Aaron M. Butts; George A. Kiraz; Lucas Van Rompay (eds.). Gorgias Encyclopedic Dictionary of the Syriac Heritage: Electronic Edition. Gorgias Press.
- Carlson, Thomas A. (2018). Christianity in Fifteenth-Century Iraq. Cambridge University Press.
- Gill, Joseph (1959). The Council of Florence. Cambridge University Press.
- Ignatius Jacob III (2008). History of the Monastery of Saint Matthew in Mosul. Translated by Matti Moosa. Gorgias Press.
- Joseph, John (1983). Muslim-Christian Relations and Inter-Christian Rivalries in the Middle East: The Case of the Jacobites in an Age of Transition. State University of New York Press.
- Kiraz, George A. (2011). "Behnam Ḥadloyo". In Sebastian P. Brock; Aaron M. Butts; George A. Kiraz; Lucas Van Rompay (eds.). Gorgias Encyclopedic Dictionary of the Syriac Heritage: Electronic Edition. Gorgias Press. p. 68.
- Samir, Khalil (1991). "Gabriel V". Coptic Encyclopedia. Macmillan. pp. 1130a–1133a.
- Swanson, Mark N. (2010). The Coptic Papacy in Islamic Egypt (641–1517). American University in Cairo Press.
- Wilkinson, Robert (2007). Orientalism, Aramaic and Kabbalah in the Catholic Reformation: The First Printing of the Syriac New Testament. Brill.

Preceded by Athanasius Abraham	Syriac Orthodox Maphrian of the East; 1404–1412	Succeeded by Dioscorus Behnam Shatti
Preceded by Ignatius Abraham bar Gharib	Syriac Orthodox Patriarch of Mardin; 1412–1445	Succeeded by Office abolished
Preceded by Basil IV Simon	Syriac Orthodox Patriarch of Antioch; 1445–1454	Succeeded by Ignatius Khalaf Maʿdnoyo
