= Mittelmark =

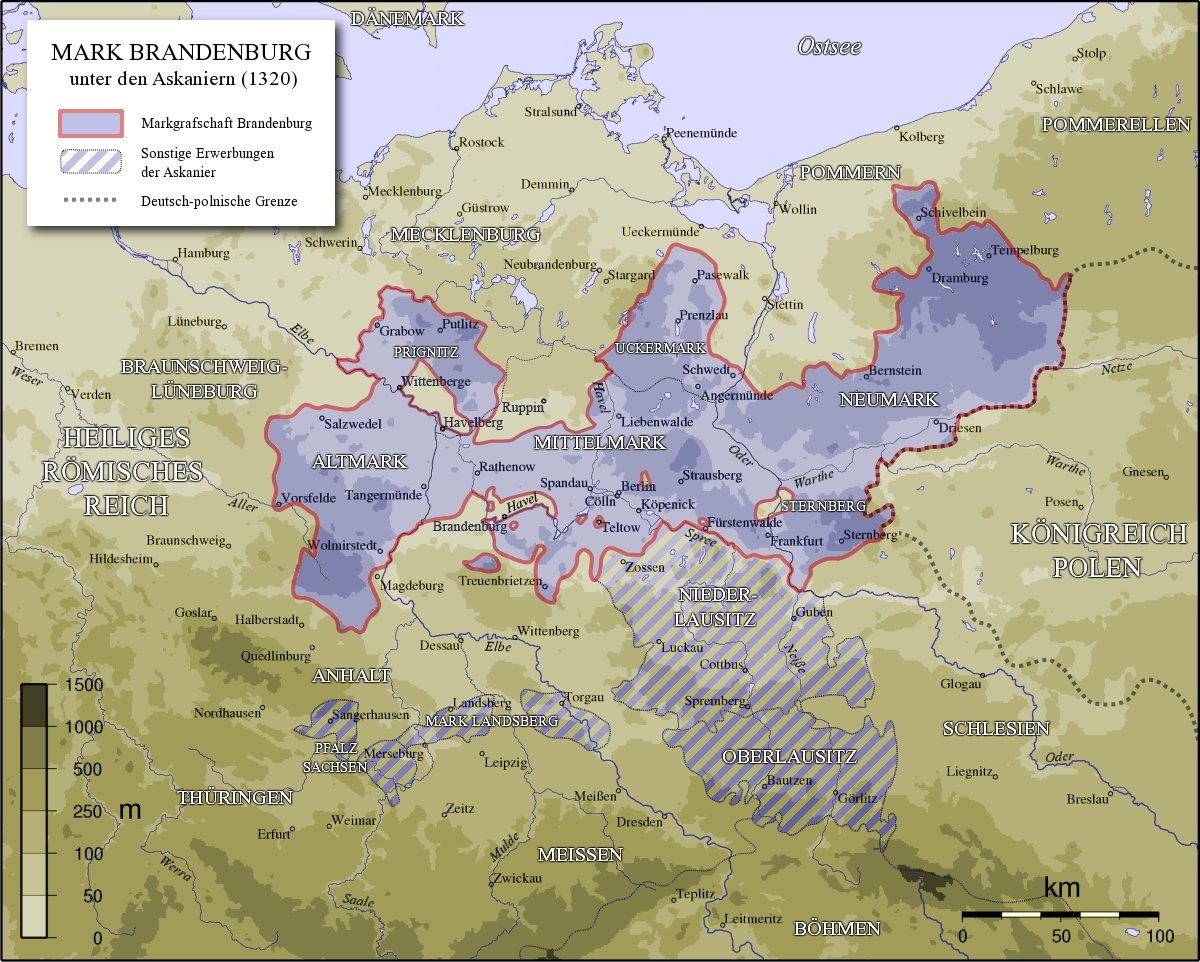
Brandenburg under the House of Ascania, 1320

The Mittelmark (German pronunciation: [ˈmɪtl̩ˌmaʁk], lit. 'Middle March') is a historical region in eastern Germany that was the core territory of the Margrave of Brandenburg between the Oder and Elbe rivers.

The name refers to the location of the territory between the Altmark (Old March) and the Neumark (New March) and it lay roughly in the area of the earlier Nordmark.

The name of Mittelmark was used for a short-lived province of the Kingdom of Prussia in 1713 and again from 1993 to the present for the district of Potsdam-Mittelmark in the German state of Brandenburg. However, the southern part of the district containing Bad Belzig did not historically belong to Mittelmark, it was instead a part of Saxony.
