= Concordats of Constance =

Agreements ending the Western Schism

The Concordats of Constance were five agreements between the Catholic Church and the "nations" of England (including Scotland), France, Germany (including Scandinavia and eastern Europe), Italy (Imperial Italy, the Papal States, Naples, Sicily, and the Venetian Republic) and Spain (Aragon, Castile, Navarre and Portugal) in the aftermath of the Council of Constance (1414–18) that ended the Western Schism. The French and German concordats were signed on 15 April 1418, the Spanish on 13 May and the English on 12 July. The Italian agreement is lost. The delegates to the council had sat as five nations—England, France, Germany, Italy and Spain—each with one vote. On 21 March 1418, the concordats were approved in advance by the council as conforming to and fulfilling the decrees of 30 October 1417.

The issues dealt with in the concordats were of relatively minor importance and were unconnected to the reform movement in the church. Their chief importance lies in the fact that, together with the seven reform statutes of Pope Martin V, they settled all outstanding issues and brought the papal schism to an end. While the English concordat was perpetual, the French and German concordats had a term of five years (that is, they expired in 1423), since the French and Germans agreed to remit annates to the papacy only until it was firmly established and could live off its own revenues

The English concordat limited the granting of papal dispensations for holding a plurality of benefices to men of noble birth or high scholarship. No such grants would be issued as favours for the courtiers of secular or ecclesiastical lords. Dispensations allowing clerics to live away from their benefices or allowing laymen to hold benefices for grace periods before taking holy orders were revoked. The appropriation of benefices for the use of monasteries, collegiate churches or cathedral chapters was prohibited without the approval of the local bishop.

For a long time, it was thought that concordats had been signed with the Spanish and Italian nations, but that the texts had been lost. In 1867, the German historian Bernhard Hübler argued that the French concordat applied also to Italy and Spain. For example, on the annates, it reads "all those contained in the present chapter take their place with the entire French nation". (Note: quae omnia in praesenti capitulo contenta locum habeant pro tota Gallica natione) Of abbeys, it says that "the fruit of [the abbeys], according to the assessment of the tithes, [shall be] 200 livres tournois; in Italy and Spain, however, [it] shall not exceed the annual value of 60 livres tournois, making confirmations or canonical provisions for those that belong to others." (Note: De abbatiis ... quarum fructus, secundum taxationem decimae, cc librarum Turonensium parvorum, in Italia vero et Hispania lx librarum Turonensium parvorum valorem annuum non excedant, fiant confirmationes aut provisiones canonicae per illos ad quos alias pertinet) By subsuming Spanish and Italian interests under those of the French and remitting certain annates to France, the concordat increased the prestige of the French. A copy of the Spanish concordat, however, was later found and was published in 1954. No Italian concordat has yet been found.
