= Ambroise de Loré =

French knight (1396–1446)

Ambroise de Loré (1396, château de Loré, Oisseau – May 24, 1446, Paris) was baron of Ivry in Normandy, a French military commander, and comrade-in-arms of Joan of Arc. A reforming commisar of trades and police and "Garde de la prévôté de Paris" (guard of the provost of Paris), he became Provost of Paris from 1436 to 1446. He also fought at the battles of Agincourt, La Brossinière, Orléans and Patay.

== Life ==
He was born at the Chateau de Loré in Oisseau (Mayenne). His first exploit in arms was at the battle of Agincourt in 1415; he followed the party of the Armagnacs and attached himself to the Dauphin Charles. He waged continual warfare against the English in Maine until the advent of Joan of Arc. He fought at Jargeau, at Meung-sur-Loire and at Patay (1429).

Using his fortress of Saint-Céneri as a base of operations during the next few years, he seized upon Matthew Gough near Vivoin in 1431, and made an incursion as far as the walls of Caen, whence he brought away three thousand prisoners. Taken captive himself in 1433, he was exchanged for John Talbot, 1st Earl of Shrewsbury. In 1435 he and Jean de Dunois defeated the English near Meulan, and in 1436 he helped the Constable of France, Arthur de Richemont, to expel them from Paris.

He was appointed Provost of Paris in February 1437, and in 1438 he was made "judge and general reformer of the malefactors of the kingdom." He was present in 1439 at the taking of Meaux, in 1441 at that of Pontoise, and he died on 24 May 1446.
