= Siege of Caen =

The siege of Caen may refer to:

- Siege of Caen (1346) English army under Edward III took the city before the Battle of Crecy during the Hundred Years' War
- Siege of Caen (1417) English army under Henry V captures city during the Hundred Years' War
- Siege of Caen (1450) French army retakes the city towards the end of the Hundred Years' War
