= 1417 =

1417 in various calendars
- Gregorian calendar: 1417; MCDXVII
- Ab urbe condita: 2170
- Armenian calendar: 866; ԹՎ ՊԿԶ
- Assyrian calendar: 6167
- Balinese saka calendar: 1338–1339
- Bengali calendar: 823–824
- Berber calendar: 2367
- English Regnal year: 4 Hen. 5 – 5 Hen. 5
- Buddhist calendar: 1961
- Burmese calendar: 779
- Byzantine calendar: 6925–6926
- Chinese calendar: 丙申年 (Fire Monkey); 4114 or 3907 — to — 丁酉年 (Fire Rooster); 4115 or 3908
- Coptic calendar: 1133–1134
- Discordian calendar: 2583
- Ethiopian calendar: 1409–1410
- Hebrew calendar: 5177–5178
- Hindu calendars
- Vikram Samvat: 1473–1474
- Shaka Samvat: 1338–1339
- Kali Yuga: 4517–4518
- Holocene calendar: 11417
- Igbo calendar: 417–418
- Iranian calendar: 795–796
- Islamic calendar: 819–820
- Japanese calendar: Ōei 24 (応永２４年)
- Javanese calendar: 1331–1332
- Julian calendar: 1417; MCDXVII
- Korean calendar: 3750
- Minguo calendar: 495 before ROC 民前495年
- Nanakshahi calendar: −51
- Thai solar calendar: 1959–1960
- Tibetan calendar: མེ་ཕོ་སྤྲེ་ལོ་ (male Fire-Monkey); 1543 or 1162 or 390 — to — མེ་མོ་བྱ་ལོ་ (female Fire-Bird); 1544 or 1163 or 391

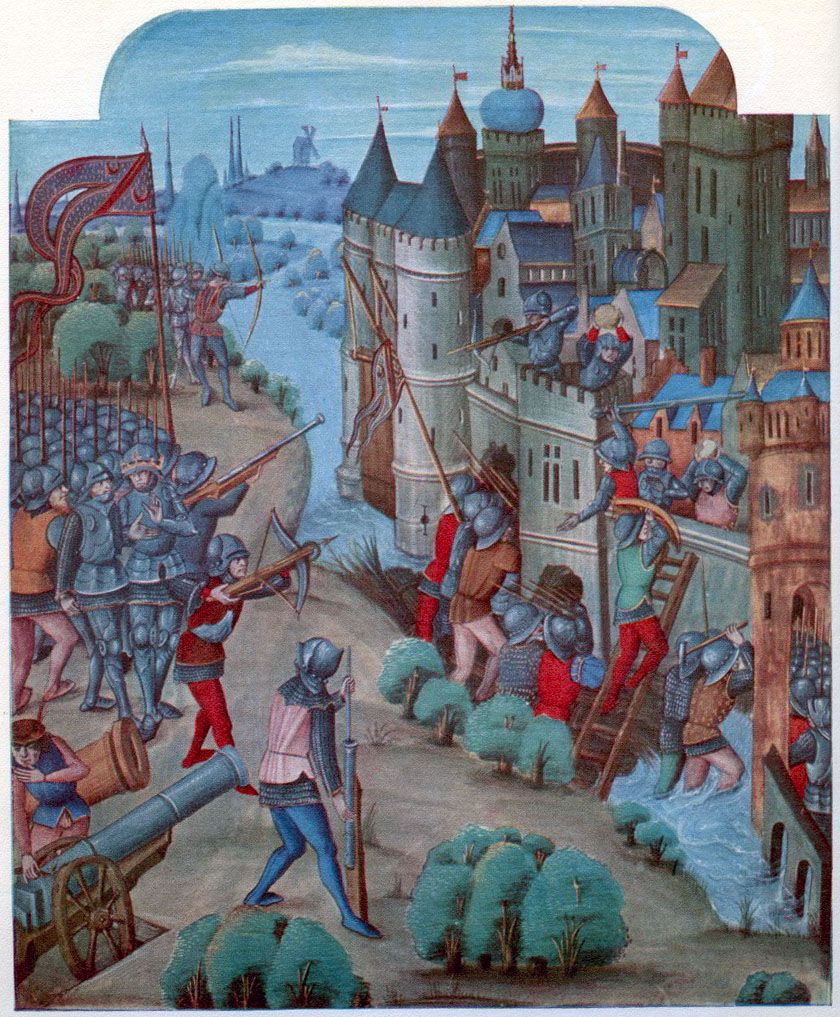
August 18: The Siege of Caen begins in France as England invades Normandy.

Year 1417 (MCDXVII) was a common year starting on Friday of the Julian calendar.

== Events ==
=== January–March ===
- January 19 – After the dismissal of Al-Musta'in as Caliph of Cairo by the Sultan Shaykh al-Mahmudi is declared unlawful by Islamic clerics, Shaykh arranges Al-Musta'in and three sons of the late Sultan Faraj to be transferred away from Cairo to Alexandria.
- January 19 – Joanna II, Queen of Naples, issues a pardon for Giacomo Orsini, who had rebelled against her predecessor, King Ladislaus of Naples.
- February 15 – In Korea, Grand Prince Yangnyeong of the Joseon Kingdom and heir to the throne, causes a scandal that ends any possibility of becoming the next King. Yangnyeong courts the wife of another official and attempts to bring here into the royal palace in Seoul, ending in his banishment from the royal household and being replaced on June 3, 1418.
- February 24 – An envoy of the Sultan of the Ottoman Empire, identified in Italian records as "Chamitzi", arrives in the Republic of Venice to demand the release of Ottoman soldiers who had been taken as prisoners of war during the conflict between Venice and the Ottomans. The release of each nation's prisoners of war is unresolved and hinders peace negotiations.
- March 5 – Alexios IV becomes the new Emperor of Trebizond (located in what is now Turkey along the Black Sea) upon the death of his father, Manuel III.
- March 10 – In Bohemia, Johannes Cardinalis von Bergreichenstein, rector of the University of Prague issues a proclamation declaring that the theological teachings of the late Jan Hus are doctrine confirmed for all Christians, leading to eventual condemnation by the Roman Catholic Church and the Pope for heresy.

=== April–June ===
- April 5 – Jean de Touraine, the Dauphin of France and heir to the French throne as the eldest living son of King Charles VI, dies suddenly at the age of 18 from a suspected poisoning. Jean's 15-year-old brother, Charles, becomes the new Dauphin.
- April 18 – Frederick I, Elector of Brandenburg, is appointed to an additional position as Archchamberlain of the Holy Roman Empire.
- April 29 – Louis II, Duke of Anjou, and former claimant to being King of Naples, dies at the age of 39 and is succeeded by his 13-year-old son, Louis III.
- May 2 – Władysław II Jagiełło, King of Poland and Grand Duke of Lithuania, remarries less than year after the death of his wife Anna of Cilli, taking Elizabeth Granowska as his third wife in a ceremony at Sanok. Because the Polish nobles do not approve of the marriage, Elizabeth's coronation does not take place for six months.
- May 31 – William, Duke of Bavaria-Straubing and Count of Holland, dies from an infection after being bitten by a dog. His death causes a conflict between his daughter Jacqueline, Countess of Hainaut and his brother John III, with Jacqueline receiving Holland, Zeeland and Hainaut, and John becoming the new Duke.
- June 2 – King Henry V of England issues an order directing penalties for wearing of an unauthorized coat of arms, directing sheriffs, on the day of mustering of persons for an exhibition, to inquire in such cases "by whose gift he holds those arms or coats of arms, except for those who bore arms with us at the Battle of Aguincourt."
- June 24 – The earliest extant description of Tynwald Day; the annual meeting of the Isle of Man's parliament (Tynwald) is written down in law. Its first recorded use for the promulgation of laws dates to 24 June 1417, when Sir John Stanley presided.
- June 29 – An English fleet, led by the Earl of Huntingdon, defeats a fleet of Genoese carracks and captures their admiral, the "Bastard of Bourbon".
- June 30 – In France, the Baron of Trévoux reverses a ban against the town's Jewish population, and allows them to study the Talmud without interference.

=== July–September ===
- July 27 – After being the last claimant to the papacy, the Antipope Benedict XIII is excommunicated and deposed by the Council of Constance, bringing to an end the Great Western Schism.
- July 30 – King Henry V of England begins and invasion of France, where he wishes to claim the throne, taking with him 42,000 soldiers on a fleet of 1,500 ships.
- August 12 – King Henry V of England begins using the English language in correspondence back to England from France, where he is leading a campaign, marking the beginning of this king's continuous usage of English in prose, and the beginning of the restoration of English as an official language for the first time since the Norman Conquest, some 350 years earlier.
- August 18 – King Henry V begins the siege of Caen with bombardment of the walls using advanced weaponry.
- September 4 – English troops succeed in opening the gates of Caen and begin a massacre of over 1,800 civilians.
- September 20 – Siege of Caen (1417): Guillaume de Montenay surrenders Caen to English invaders led by King Henry V. The city remains under English control until 1450.c

=== October–December ===
- October 5 – King Henry V of England summons the English Parliament to assemble on November 16.
- October 31 – On Hallowtide, by order of the Lord May Henry Barton, street lighting is first used in London, with lanterns to be hung out on winter evenings, lasting until the night of Candlemas on February 2.
- November 9 – In what is now the Mediterranean coast of Spain, six-year-old Muhammad VIII becomes the new Sultan of the Emirate of Granada upon the death of his father, the Sultan Yusuf III.
- November 11 – On St. Martin's Day, with all three previous claimants to the office of Pope gone, the 53-member Council of Constance unanimously elects Oddone Colonna to be the new Pontiff. Colonna will take the name of Saint Martin of Tours upon his consecration.
- November 16 – The English Parliament opens at Westminster for a 31-day session and re-elects Roger Flower as Speaker of the House of Commons.
- November 19 – The coronation of Elizabeth Granowska as Queen consort of Poland takes place after King Wladyslaw receives a special dispensation from the Council of Constance.
- November 21 – The coronation of Oddone Colonna as Pope Martin V takes place in Constance as he becomes the 206th Pope of the Roman Catholic Church. His installation ends a period of two years and five months without a Pope at Rome, as he succeeds Pope Gregory XII, who had abdicated on July 4, 1415.
- December 14 – In punishment for his conviction for high treason against the Crown of England, Sir John Oldcastle, Baron Cobham, is hanged outside the church of St Giles in the Fields and then (carrying out the sentence for a prior conviction of heresy) burned, "gallows and all".
- December 17 – The English Parliament closes and King Henry V gives royal assent to its one major law, the Attorney Act 1417, which provides that "All persons until the next parliament may make their attornies in wapentakes, hundreds, and court barons."
- December 20 – Richard Talbot is appointed as the new Archbishop of Dublin, leader of the Roman Catholic Church in Ireland, eight months after the death of the Archbishop Thomas Cranley.

=== Date unknown ===
- Mircea cel Bătrân loses Dobruja to the Ottomans and pays them tribute, thus preventing Wallachia from becoming an Ottoman province.
- Chimalpopoca, son of Huitzilihuitl, succeeds his father as Tlatoani (monarch) of Tenochtitlan (modern Mexico City)
- Imadaddin Nasimi, an Azerbaijani poet and the foremost proponent of Hurufism, was flayed alive and executed in Aleppo, Syria under the order of Aleppan ulema.
- At Shamakhi (located in what is now the Republic of Azerbaijan), Khalilullah I becomes the new Shirvanshah, ruler of the Kingdom of Shirvan, following the death of his father, the Shirvanshah Ibrahim I.

== Births ==
- February 23
  - Pope Paul II (d. 1471)
  - Louis IX, Duke of Bavaria-Landshut (1450–1479) (d. 1479)
- May 25 – Catherine of Cleves, Duchess consort regent of Guelders (d. 1479)
- June 19 – Sigismondo Pandolfo Malatesta, lord of Rimini (d. 1468)
- November 8 – Philipp I, Count of Hanau-Lichtenberg (1458–1480) (d. 1480)
- November 19 – Frederick I, Count Palatine of Simmern from 1459 until 1480 (d. 1480)
- November 23 – William FitzAlan, 16th Earl of Arundel, English politician (d. 1487)
- date unknown
  - Jöns Bengtsson Oxenstierna, regent of Sweden 1457 and 1465–1466, archbishop of Uppsala 1448–1467
  - Nicholas of Flüe, Swiss hermit and saint (d. 1487)

== Deaths ==
- January – Art mac Art MacMurrough-Kavanagh, King of Leinster (b. 1357)
- March 5 – Manuel III Megas Komnenos, Emperor of Trebizond (b. 1364)
- April 29 – Louis II of Anjou (b. 1377)
- May 31 – William II, Duke of Bavaria (b. 1365)
- September 4 – Robert Hallam, English Catholic bishop
- September 22 – Anne of Auvergne, Sovereign Dauphine of Auvergne and Countess of Forez (b. 1358)
- September 26 – Francesco Zabarella, Italian jurist (b. 1360)
- October 18 – Pope Gregory XII (b. c. 1325)
- November 17 – Gazi Evrenos, Ottoman general (b. 1288)
- December 14 – John Oldcastle, English Lollard leader (executed)
- probable – Huitzilíhuitl, Aztec ruler of Tenochtitlan
