= Norbury (surname) =

Norbury is a surname, and may refer to:

- Chris Norbury (born 1986), English snooker player
- Chris Norbury (businessman) (born 1974), British chief executive officer
- Henry Norbury (born 1415), English soldier and politician
- John Norbury (died 1414), English courtier, ambassador and politician
- Mick Norbury (born 1969), English footballer
- Rob Norbury, British actor
- Victor Norbury (1887–1972), English cricketer and footballer
