= 1450 =

1450 in various calendars
- Gregorian calendar: 1450; MCDL
- Ab urbe condita: 2203
- Armenian calendar: 899; ԹՎ ՊՂԹ
- Assyrian calendar: 6200
- Balinese saka calendar: 1371–1372
- Bengali calendar: 856–857
- Berber calendar: 2400
- English Regnal year: 28 Hen. 6 – 29 Hen. 6
- Buddhist calendar: 1994
- Burmese calendar: 812
- Byzantine calendar: 6958–6959
- Chinese calendar: 己巳年 (Earth Snake); 4147 or 3940 — to — 庚午年 (Metal Horse); 4148 or 3941
- Coptic calendar: 1166–1167
- Discordian calendar: 2616
- Ethiopian calendar: 1442–1443
- Hebrew calendar: 5210–5211
- Hindu calendars
- Vikram Samvat: 1506–1507
- Shaka Samvat: 1371–1372
- Kali Yuga: 4550–4551
- Holocene calendar: 11450
- Igbo calendar: 450–451
- Iranian calendar: 828–829
- Islamic calendar: 853–854
- Japanese calendar: Hōtoku 2 (宝徳２年)
- Javanese calendar: 1365–1366
- Julian calendar: 1450; MCDL
- Korean calendar: 3783
- Minguo calendar: 462 before ROC 民前462年
- Nanakshahi calendar: −18
- Thai solar calendar: 1992–1993
- Tibetan calendar: ས་མོ་སྦྲུལ་ལོ་ (female Earth-Snake); 1576 or 1195 or 423 — to — ལྕགས་ཕོ་རྟ་ལོ་ (male Iron-Horse); 1577 or 1196 or 424

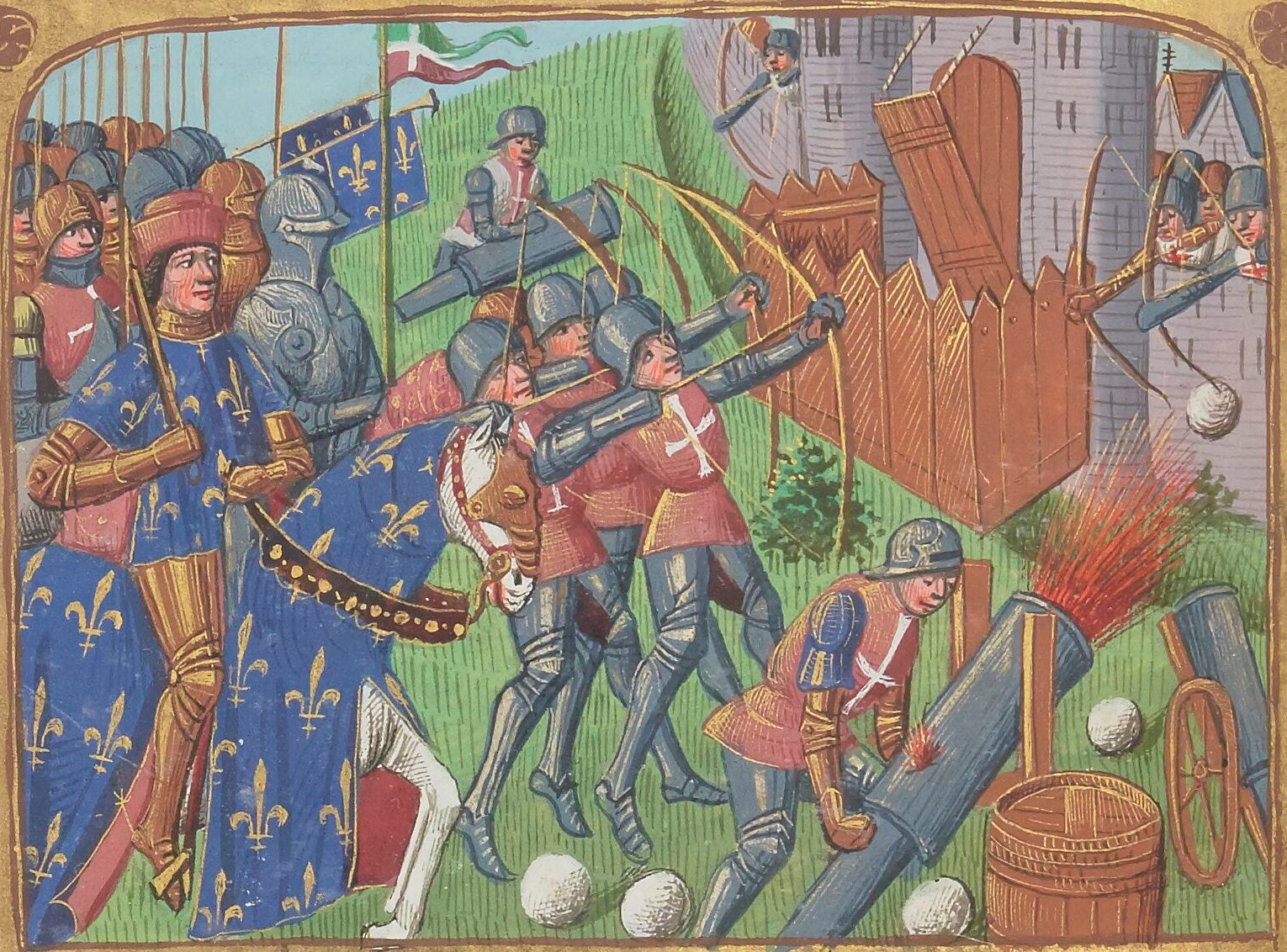
June 5: The 31-day Siege of Caen by French troops begins against the English-occupied fortress of Caen in France.

Year 1450 (MCDL) was a common year starting on Thursday of the Julian calendar.

== Events ==
=== January–March ===
- January 19 – The Jingtai Era begins in China under the Emperor Daizong, and the Zhengtong Era ends after 14 years.
- January 19 – King James II of Scotland gives royal assent to numerous acts passed by the Scottish Parliament in 1449, including the Leases Act 1449 ("Of takis of landis for termes and takis of wedset (mortgaged) landis eftir the oute quyting of the lande"), the Coinage Act, the Parties Summoned to King's Council Act and the Statute Law Revision Act ("Persons chosyn of the thre estatis til examyn the actis of parliamentis and general counsallis").
- February 7 – John de la Pole, 2nd Duke of Suffolk, marries Lady Margaret Beaufort.
- February 26 – Francesco Sforza enters Milan after a siege, becoming Duke of the city-state, and founding a dynasty that will rule Milan for a century.
- March 10 – Colonization of Terceira Island by Portugal begins as Dom Henrique, om Navigador (known in English accounds as "Prince Henry the Navigator" assigns jurisdiction to Jácome de Bruges.
- March 11 – The First Margrave War comes to an end in Germany as Albrecht III Achilles, Elector of Brandenburg, is defeated by Nuremberg troops at the battle of Pillenreuther Reiher.
- March 15 – English commander Thomas Kyriell and 2,500 soldiers land at Cherbourg in English-occupied France, where they join another 1,800 English troops recruited by the Duke of Somerset from the garrisons at Bayeux, Caen and Vire.
- March 25 – Francesco I Sforza becomes the Duke of Milan, restoring the Duchy of Milan and bringing an end to the Golden Ambrosian Republic that had governed Milan.

=== April–June ===
- April 8 – At the Korean capital of Hanseong, Munjong of Joseon becomes the new King of Korea upon the death of his father, Sejong the Great.
- April 15 – The Battle of Formigny takes place as French troops under the Comte de Clermont defeat an English army under Sir Thomas Kyriel and Sir Matthew Gough, which was attempting to relieve Caen
- May 8 – Jack Cade's Rebellion: Kentishmen revolt against King Henry VI of England.
- May 9 – Abdal-Latif Mirza, a Timurid dynasty monarch, is assassinated.
- May 13 – Charles VIII of Sweden, also serving as Carl I of Norway, is declared deposed from the latter throne, in favor of Christian I of Denmark.
- June 5 – French troops under Guy de Richemont besiege Caen in English-occupied Normandy in France, attacking the fortress commanded by Edmund Beaufort, 1st Duke of Somerset.
- June 8 – The 17th English Parliament of King Henry VI closes. Royal assent is given to several acts, including a seven-year prohibition of importation of products from the Dutch provinces of Holland, Zealand and Brabant "until English cloth may be sold there."
- June 18 – Battle of Solefields (Sevenoaks): Jack Cade's rebels are driven from London by loyal troops.
- June 20 – The First Margrave War between Nuremberg and Brandenburg ends with the signing of a peace treaty at Bamberg. Under the treaty, Albrecht III Achilles, Elector of Brandenburg, is forced to return all lands that he had captured from Nuremberg.

=== July–September ===
- July 6 – Caen surrenders to the French.
- July 7 – The surviving rebels who had participated in Jack Cade's rebellion in England are pardoned by King Henry VI. Cade himself, who had adoped the alias "John Mortimer", is pardoned under that name until his identity is discovered. Cade himself is killed by Alexander Iden on July 12, after resisting arrest for treason. His corpse is given a mock trial at Newgate Prison and the body beheaded, then dragged through the streets of London and quartered, with the limbs being sent throughout the county of Kent, where the rebellion had started.
- August 2 – The coronation of Christian I of Denmark as King of Norway takes place at Trondheim.
- August 12 – Cherbourg, the last English territory in Normandy, surrenders to the French.
- August 29 – The Treaty of Bergen is signed by officials of Norway and Sweden to reunite the two kingdoms under the rule of King Christian I. Both Norway and Sweden retain self-government and their own governing bodies.
- September 5 – Three months after the close of the last session, King Henry VI summons the members of the English Parliament to assemble at Westminster on November 6.
- September 8 – Pietro di Campofregoso is elected as the new Doge of the Republic of Genoa following the abdication of his cousin, Lodovico di Campofregoso.
- September 19 – China's Emperor Yingzong returns to Beijing after having been held as a prisoner of war by the Mongols since September 1, 1449. Upon returning, he is held under house arrest in the Forbidden City along with his wife, the Empress Qian, on orders of his younger brother Emperor Daizong.

=== October–December ===
- October 5 – Jews are expelled from Lower Bavaria, by order of Duke Ludwig IX.
- November 3 – The University of Barcelona is founded by the grant of King Alfonso V of Aragon.
- November 6 – The 18th parliament of King Henry VI of England opens. Commons elects William Oldhall as its speaker.
- November 23 – First Siege of Krujë: Albanian troops are victorious, forcing an Ottoman army of approximately 100,000 men to retreat from Albania.
- December 23 – In Rome, the collapse of the Ponte Sant'Angelo, a bridge over the Via Giulia and the subsequent stampede combine to kill more than 300 people, most of whom were on a pilgrimage to the Holy See.

=== Date unknown ===
- Machu Picchu (Quechua: Machu Pikchu, "Old mountain"), a pre-Columbian Inca site located 2,400 meters (7,875 ft) above sea level, is believed to be under construction.
- A religious sacrifice of over a hundred children is performed around this time, outside of the ancient city of Chan Chan (near modern Trujillo), on the north coast of Peru.
- Johannes Gutenberg has set up his movable type printing press, as a commercial operation in Mainz, by this date.

== Births ==
- February 12 – Yejong of Joseon, Joseon King (d. 1469)
- May 18 – Piero Soderini, Florentine statesman (d. 1513)
- June 22 – Eleanor of Naples, Duchess of Ferrara (d. 1493)
- July 25 – Jakob Wimpfeling, Renaissance humanist (d. 1528)
- August 18 – Marko Marulić, Croatian poet (d. 1524)
- September 25 – Ursula of Brandenburg, Duchess of Münsterberg-Oels and Countess of Glatz (d. 1508)
- November 12 – Jacques of Savoy, Count of Romont, Prince of Savoy (d. 1486)
- date unknown
  - William Catesby, English politician (d. 1485)
  - Bartolomeo Montagna, Italian painter (d. 1523)
  - Heinrich Isaak, German-Dutch composer (d. 1517)
  - John Cabot, Italian-born explorer (d. 1499)
- probable
  - Kamāl ud-Dīn Behzād, Persian leader of the Herat school
  - Hieronymus Bosch, Dutch painter (d. 1516)
  - Gaspar Corte-Real, Portuguese explorer (d. 1501)
  - Juan de la Cosa, Spanish navigator and cartographer (d. 1510)
  - Josquin des Prez, Dutch composer (d. 1521)
  - Heinrich Isaac, Franco-Flemish composer (d. 1517)
  - Pietro Antonio Solari, Italian architect (d. 1493)
  - Petrus Thaborita, Dutch historian and monk (d. 1527)
  - Nyai Gede Pinateh, Javanese merchant (d. 1500)

== Deaths ==
- January 9 – Adam Moleyns, English courtier and Bishop of Chichester
- February 9 – Agnès Sorel, mistress of Charles VII of France (b. c. 1422)
- April 8 – Sejong the Great of Joseon, ruler of Korea (b. 1397)
- May 2 – William de la Pole, 1st Duke of Suffolk, English military leader (born 1396)
- May 9 – Abdal-Latif Mirza, ruler of Transoxania
- July 2 – Ranuccio Farnese il Vecchio, Italian condottiero (b. c. 1390)
- July 4 – James Fiennes, 1st Baron Saye and Sele, English soldier and politician (b. c. 1395)
- July 18 – Francis I, Duke of Brittany (b. 1414)
- July 26 – Cecily Neville, Duchess of Warwick (b. 1424)
- August 15 – Alberto da Sarteano, Italian Franciscan friar and papal legate (b. 1385)
- August 27 – Reginald West, 6th Baron De La Warr, English politician (b. 1395)
- August 31 – Isabella of Navarre, Countess of Armagnac (b. 1395)
- September 16 – Louis Aleman, French cardinal
- September 22 – William Tresham, English politician
- October 1 – Leonello d'Este, Marquis of Ferrara, Italian noble (b. 1407)
- November 3 – Paola Colonna, Lady of Piombino (b. c. 1378)
- November 5 – John IV, Count of Armagnac (b. 1396)
