= Normandy campaign of 1449–1450 =

Campaign of Hundred Years War

Normandy campaign of 1449-1450
- Part of the Hundred Years' War
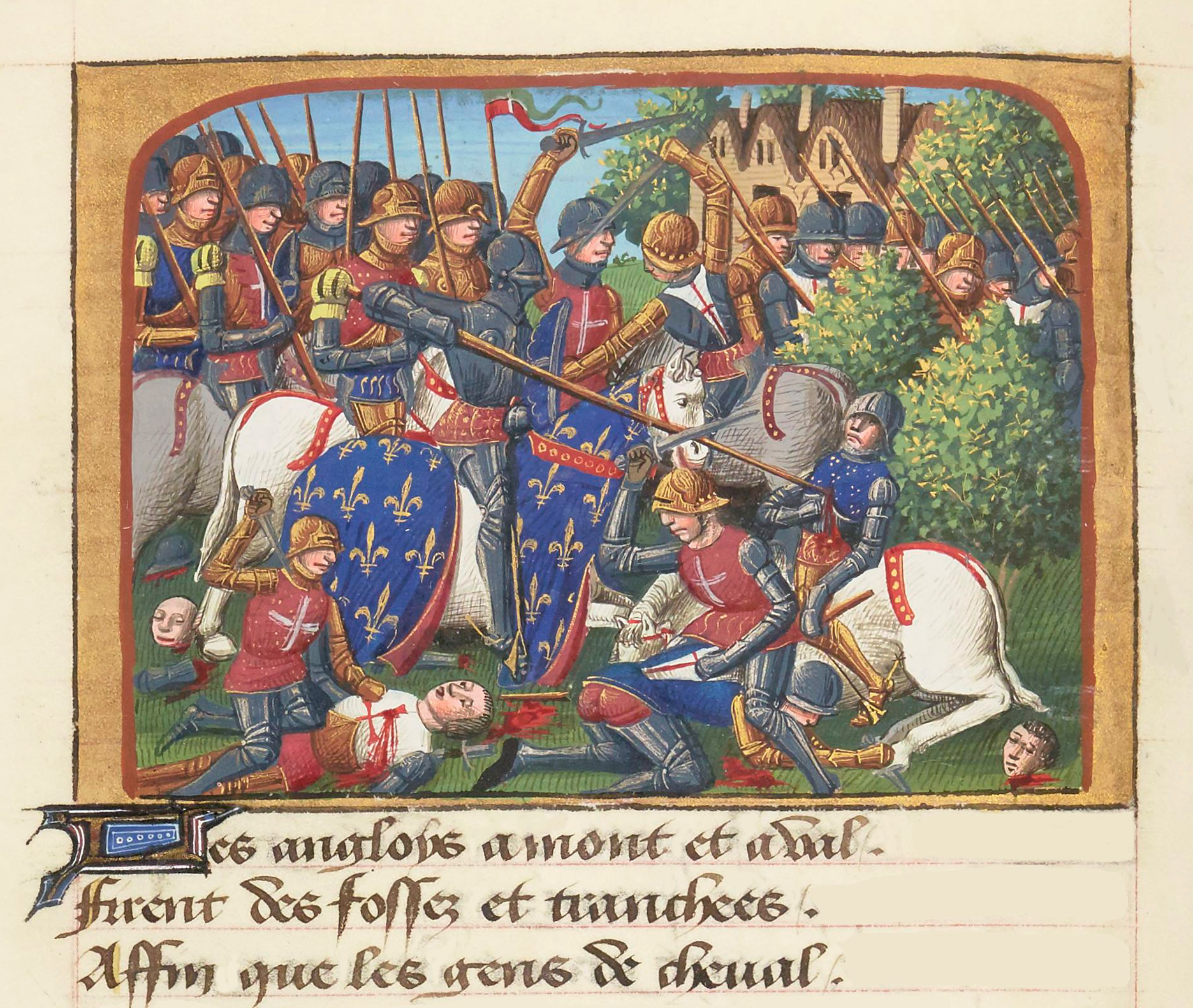
- Miniature of the Battle of Formigny from the Vigiles du roi Charles VII by Martial d'Auvergne, c. 1484
Date	31 July 1449 – 12 August 1450
Location	Normandy
Result	French and Breton victory: Normandy annexed to France

Belligerents
Kingdom of France; Duchy of Brittany	Kingdom of England

Commanders and leaders
Charles VII of France; Charles I, Duke of Bourbon; Francis I, Duke of Brittany # Arthur de Richemont; Jean Bureau; Prigent de Coëtivy †; André de Lohéac; Guy XIV de Laval; Pierre de Brézé; Jean II de Bourbon	Edmund Beaufort, 2nd Duke of Somerset (surrendered); William de la Pole, 1st Duke of Suffolk X Thomas Kyriell (POW)

The Normandy campaign of 1449–1450 took place during the Hundred Years War when the Kingdom of France undertook a military campaign to retake Normandy from the English. The war began due to the English breaking the Treaty of Tours with the surprise capture of Fougères in March, then France and Brittany retaliated and signed an alliance, declaring war on England on July 31, 1449. During the summer and autumn of 1449, the campaign was fought on two fronts: the French seized Upper Normandy while the Bretons advanced into the Cotentin Peninsula. In the spring of 1450, the two armies joined forces and crushed the English forces at the Battle of Formigny. This victory allowed for the capture of Caen and then finally Cherbourg on August 12, 1450, ending the English presence in Normandy. By strengthening the links between France and Duchy of Brittany and by delivering a decisive blow to English power, the campaign enabled the French crown to start concentrating on the Gascony front and finally capturing Bourdeaux in 1453.

== Background ==
Since 1444 and the signing of the Treaty of Tours hostilities between the French and English had ceased. King Charles VII reorganized France, both financially with the creation of a permanent tax and militarily, with the establishment of the compagnies d'ordonnance, the first form of a standing army in French history. Thus, by 1449, Charles VII could command an army of 15,000 to 20,000 well-trained and well-paid men. In contrast, England during the reign of Henry VI was in crisis: he was a weak king, leaving the real power in the hands of William de la Pole, 1st Duke of Suffolk. The country was experiencing a severe financial crisis, with debt reaching 375,000 pounds sterling. Consequently, the number of English troops was drastically reduced, from a maximum of 15,000 soldiers at the beginning of Henry VI's reign to 5,000 to 6,000 men in 1449 , dispersed as garrisons in the numerous Norman strongholds . These men were poorly paid or not paid at all, engaging in brigandage and thus exacerbating resentment among the population .Isolated, without hope of reinforcements due to the lack of a powerful army on the continent, these garrisons could not expect to withstand sieges for long.

Duke Francis I of Brittany firmly swung Brittany into the French camp by paying homage to Charles VII on March 16, 1446 at Chinon. His brother Gilles was more favorable to the English and, suspected of wanting to seize the duchy, he was arrested on June 26 and imprisoned in Châteaubriant.

Wishing to put pressure on the Duke of Brittany to secure the release of Gilles [ 9 ], King Henry VI of England ordered the capture of a Breton town. The mission was entrusted to a mercenary captain in the pay of the English, François de Surienne, known as 'the Aragonese'.Setting out from Condé-sur-Noireau in Normandy, Surienne seized the town of Fougères by surprise during the night of March 23, 1449.In the face of the refusal, Surienne ordored Edmund Beaufort, Duke of Somerset and lieutenant of Henry VI in France, to return Fougères to the Duke of Brittany, the French and Breton troops commanded by Jean de Brézé, Robert de Flocques and Jean de Clermont, seized Pont-de-l'Archeon on the Seine, commanding access to Rouen in the meantime The French and Bretons sign an alliance against England on June 17. On the 31st of July Charles VII finally declared war on England to defend his vassal, the Duke of Brittany. The French and Breton armies operated separately: the Breton army, under the command of the Duke of Brittany and the Constable of Richemont, entered Normandy from the west while the French army was led by Jean de Dunois, Counts of Eu and Saint-Pol, Pierre de Brézé [ 14 ], and Jean de Clermont invaded from the east.

== Siege of Rouen ==
With the capture of Pont-de-l'Arche and border towns like Conches, Verneuil, and Gerberoy in the following weeks, Rouen was in a very vulnerable position. Dunois's army quickly seized Pont-Audemer on August 12, then Lisieux on the 16th [ 15 ] while, in the north, the Counts of Eu and Saint-Pol attacked Pays de Caux , taking control of Dieppe, Fécamp and Arques . In the south, the Duke of Alençon recovered his duchy being well received by its inhabitants .

In Rouen, Somerset and John Talbot hesitated and no longer attempted to leave the Norman capital to meet the French .on October 9 King Charles VII and his army arrived before the gates of the city — defended by 3,000 to 4,000 Englishmen — but not before having sent letters patent of amnesty to the burghers .

On October 16 Several inhabitants helped Dunois' soldiers seize the ramparts, but they were repelled. Faced with the growing hostility of the people of Rouen, the English retreated to the city's three fortified strongholds: the old castle, the palace built by Henry V, and the two towers protecting the bridge crossing the Seine . on the 19th of October The gates were opened by the people of Rouen and the French entered the city freely, increasing the pressure on Somerset . After several days of negotiation between Somerset and Charles, the English governor capitulated on October 29 .Talbot is held as a hostage by the French, in exchange for the evacuation of the remaining English garrisons in the Pays de Caux, the payment of an indemnity of 50,000 écus and the possibility for Somerset to retire in Caen .

After a pause, the offensive resumed along the Seine, with Harfleur and then Honfleur falling after approximately a month-long siege, respectively on January 1 and February 18, 1450 .

== Breton advance in the west ==
Even before the formal alliance with France, Breton troops, commanded by Arthur de Richemont, uncle of the Duke of Brittany and Constable of France, gathered at Saint-Aubin-du-Cormier, near Fougères.on June 29, 1449 Richemont captured Saint-James-de-Beuvron, a Norman town on the Breton border. From Saint-James, Marshal de Lohéac failed to capture the islet of Tombelaine, opposite Mont Saint-Michel, but he stormed Mortain, which fell after strong resistance from the English garrison, before returning to Saint-James. Despite the opposition of Duke Francis I's council, Richemont managed to convince him to enter Normandy. In September, Peter of Brittany, the duke's brother, remained before Fougères while Richemont advanced into the Cotentin Peninsula. Due to the French advance in Upper Normandy, the English garrisons in the Cotentin could not expect reinforcements, and the towns of Coutances and then Saint-Lô surrendered within a few days. The English garrison of Carentan evacuated the town the day before the Bretons arrived. After the capture of Valognes, 20 km south of Cherbourg, Richemont's army returned to Brittany to march back to the walls of Fougères, where Surienne resisted for only a few days before capitulating on November 4.

== Battle of Formigny ==
As winter approached, only the towns of Avranches, Bricquebec, Saint-Sauveur-le-Vicomte, Cherbourg, Bayeux, Falaise, and Caen remained under English control. In London, the English Parliament convened from November 6, 1449 a few days after the fall of Rouen and Fougères, the Duke of Suffolk, deeply unpopular among members of Parliament due to the secession of the County of Maine to France—a secret clause stipulated in the Treaty of Tours was accused of treason. He managed to secure funding for a new army of approximately 3,000 men commanded by Thomas Kyriell, before being impeached by the House of Commons and arrested in the Tower of London in January 1450 .

Held up in Portsmouth by bad weather, Kyriell's army did not land at Cherbourg until March 15, Kyriell's orders were to immediately join the 2,000 men of the Caen garrison, but, pressured by the burghers of Cherbourg, he laid siege to Valognes . To support him, Somerset mustered about 1,800 men from the garrisons of Caen, Bayeux, and Vire . Valognes fell on April 10, nearly a month after Kyriell's arrival in the Cotentin . This delay allowed for the regrouping of the French and the Bretons . On The 12th of April Count Jean de Clermont, son of the Duke of Bourbon, closed the land route from Caen to Carentan with approximately 2,000 to 2,500 men, while the Constable of Richemont arrived from Brittany and was at Coutances, on the west coast of the Cotentin Peninsula, with a similar force . At Carentan, Clermont wrote to Richemont urging him to go to Saint-Lô. On April 14 Kyriell's army crossed the Bay of Veys, passable at low tide, a few kilometers north of Carentan .

Resisting pressure from the locals, Clermont—outnumbered—let the English pass, writing to Richemont that he would pursue Kyriell the next morning, asking him to also take the road to Bayeux to fix Kyriell . On April 15 Clermont and his army headed towards Bayeux and, in the early afternoon, met Kyriell, who had halted his march around the village of Formigny at 14 o'clock in the evening. According to the British military historian Alfred Burne, Kyriell was unaware of Richemont's movement and therefore numerically superior army wanted to confront Clermont on more favourable ground than in the marshes of Carentan, while being able to hope for help from Somerset coming from Caen. The battle began between the French and English, and despite repeated assaults by French lances, the English resisted. Kyriell remained in a static position, not counter-attacking, when Richemont emerged from the southeast, coming from the village of Trévières, with his 2,000 soldiers. Methodically, the Constable deployed behind the English, who broke their ranks before a new assault by Pierre de Brézé. The English defeat was total; Kyriell was captured and his army annihilated,.

== Surrender of English Normandy ==
The English captain Matthew Gough managed to rally some troops and reached Bayeux and then Caen. The announcement of Kyriell's defeat had the effect of a house of cards. Vire was quickly captured and then Clermont besieged Bayeux, where he was joined by Dunois, while Richemont took Avranches with the rest of the Breton troops led by Duke Francis of Brittany. With these cities captured, Caen was in turn besieged by four armies starting from June 5 Charles VII's to the northwest, Clermont's and Richemont's to the west, in front of the Abbaye aux Hommes, Jean de Dunois to the south at Vaucelles, and the Duke of Alençon to the northeast, in front of the Abbaye aux Dames. Somerset signed an agreement on June 24, in which he pledges to hand over the keys to the city on July 1. After the rapid capture of Falaise on July 21 According to Poton de Xaintrailles, Cherbourg was the last stronghold held by the English in Normandy. On the 12th of July Clermont and Richemont laid siege to the Norman port, which was strongly defended. Artilleryman Jean Bureau ingeniously positioned his cannons on the beach and twice a day insulated them with animal hides to protect them from the high tide. Unlike other towns, the English defended themselves by inflicting heavy losses on the French and Breton troops, including the French Admiral Prigent de Coëtivy and Joan of Arc's comrade-in-arms, Tugdual de Kermoysan. But on August 12, 1450, Captain Thomas Gower of Cherbourg handed over the keys to the city to Richemont: in one year, Charles VII had reconquered, at the cost of minimal losses, the entirety of Normandy.

== Bibliography ==
- Contamine, Philippe (2007). Charles VII : Une vie, une politique [Charles VII : A Life, A Policy] (in French). Paris: Perrin. ISBN 9782262039752.
- Burne, Alfred H (1956). The Agincourt War (1st ed.). London: Greenhill Books (published 1991). ISBN 1-85367-081-2.
- du Corail, Amable Sablon (2022). La Guerre de Cent Ans : Apprendre à vaincre [The Hundred Years' War: Learning to Conquer] (in French). Paris: Passé composé. ISBN 9782379332166..
