= Siege of Caen (1450) =

- Part of the Normandy campaign of 1449–1450 during the Hundred Years' War
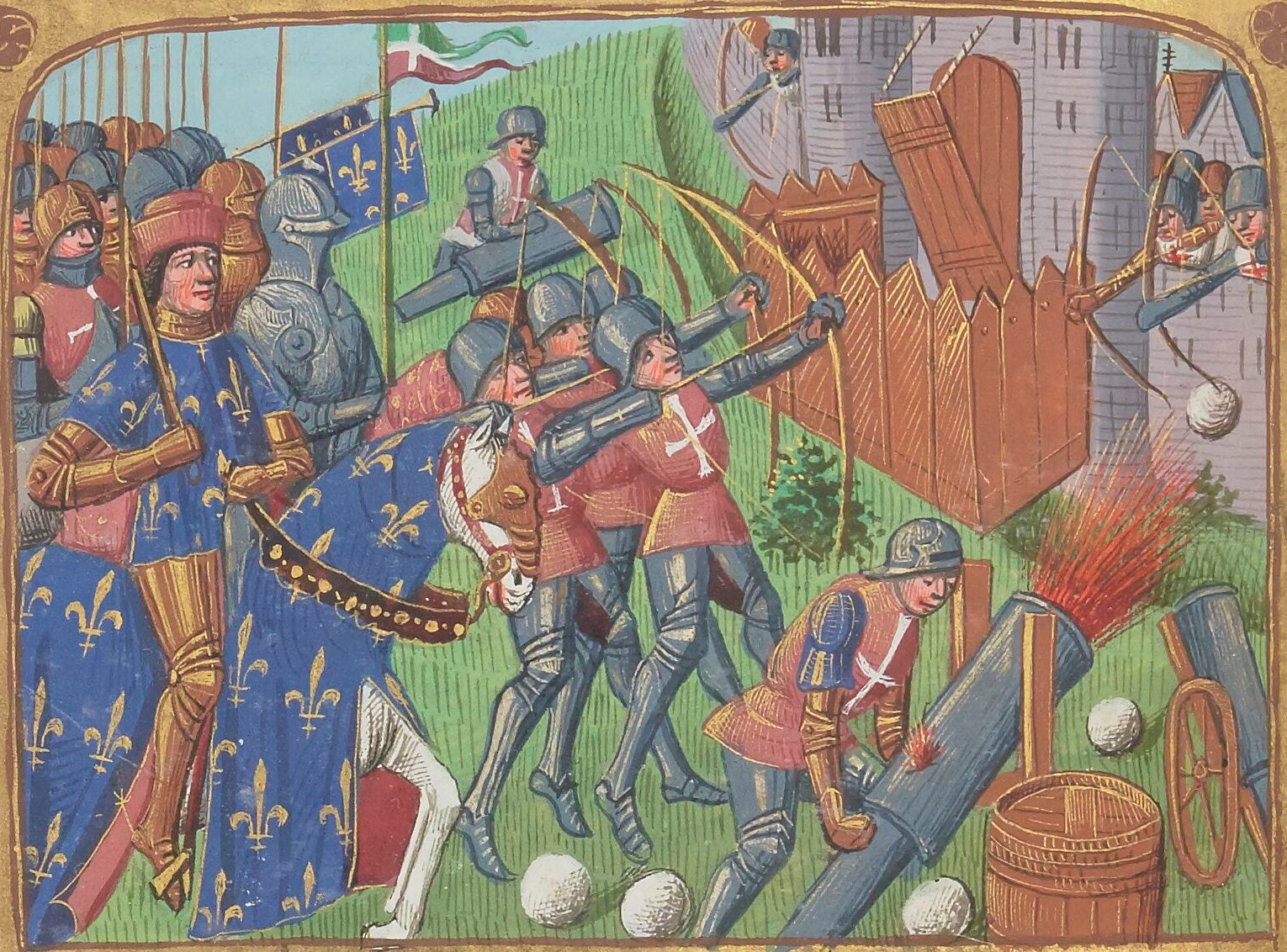
- Siege of Caen, miniature from the Vigiles du roi Charles VII by Martial d'Auvergne, c. 1484
Date	5 June – 1 July 1450
Location	Caen, Normandy
Result	Franco-Breton victory

Belligerents
Kingdom of England	Kingdom of France; Duchy of Brittany

Commanders and leaders
Edmund Beaufort, 2nd Duke of Somerset (surrendered)	Charles VII; Arthur de Richemont

Strength
~4,000 men	15,000-20,000 men

The siege of Caen took place in 1450 during the Hundred Years' War, as part of the Normandy campaign of 1449–1450, when French forces laid siege to Caen in the English-occupied Normandy following their decisive victory at the Battle of Formigny.

After Formigny, the remnants of the English Army under Edmund Beaufort, 2nd Duke of Somerset withdrew to Caen, pursued by the much larger French army commanded by Arthur de Richemont, Constable of France. After three weeks of siege Somerset surrendered. English control of Normandy rapidly collapsed, ending with the loss of Cherbourg in August.

== Background ==
Following the collapse of the 1444 Truce of Tours, hostilities between France and England resumed in 1449 with the beginning of the reconquest of Normandy by the French. After the surrender of Rouen in October of that year, the city's commander Edmund Beaufort, 2nd Duke of Somerset, was able to withdraw with his garrison to Caen, where he awaited reinforcements promised by King Henry VI to his lieutenant-general. Occupied by the English since 1417, Caen, which was one of the main English strongholds on the continent, had seen its fortifications restored and completed.

On 15 March 1450, a 3,500-men expeditionary force led by Thomas Kyriell landed at Cherbourg with the task of joining the English troops in Falaise and Caen, where John Talbot, 1st Earl of Shrewsbury had entrenched himself, and thus gathering a force capable of defeating the French in a pitched battle. On 15 April, the two armies clashed at the Battle of Formigny, in which the English were defeated.

== Preparations ==
The remnants of the English army at Formigny took refuge in Caen, where the garrisons of the last Norman strongholds, with the exception of Cherbourg, had also flocked. According to historian Victor-René Hunger, between 3,000 and 4,000 English troops were present in Caen before the siege began. Somerset focused on strengthening Caen's defenses, notably setting fire to and razing part of Bourg-l'Abbé — around the Abbaye aux Hommes, at the western entrance to Caen — and demolishing the Frileux Bridge, which crosses the Orne just south of the city, on the road to Rouen and Paris.

On the French side, Jean de Dunois and Arthur de Richemont, Constable of France, organized the siege and gathered considerable forces around Caen, accompanied by the powerful artillery of the brothers Gaspard and Jean Bureau. On 5 June, Richemont and Clermont established themselves in the outskirts of the Abbaye aux Hommes with around 8,200 men, while Dunois, soon joined by King Charles VII and 600 archers, massed his 5,000 men near the suburb of Vaucelles, on the right bank of the Orne. A third force positioned itself on the heights around the Abbaye aux Dames, northeast of the city, and a fourth on the heights north of the city, overlooking the Château de Caen. Adding the artillerymen, sappers, and carpenters needed for the siege, Victor-René Hunger estimated the number of besiegers at 20,000 men, including 15,000 combatants.

To compensate for the destruction of the Frileux Bridge and ensure communication between the two banks of the Orne, a wooden bridge was built upstream from Caen, probably between the villages of Louvigny and Allemagne.

== Siege ==
On 5 June, Richemont attacked the boulevard of the Porte de Bayeux (present-day Place Saint-Martin) but failed to establish a foothold there. To the south, Dunois attacked the bastille at the Porte Milet. Over the following days, Richemont's troops focused on undermining the ramparts in the northwestern part of the city walls (from present-day Place Fontette to Place Saint-Martin) and succeeded in bringing down several sections of the wall, including the large corner tower.

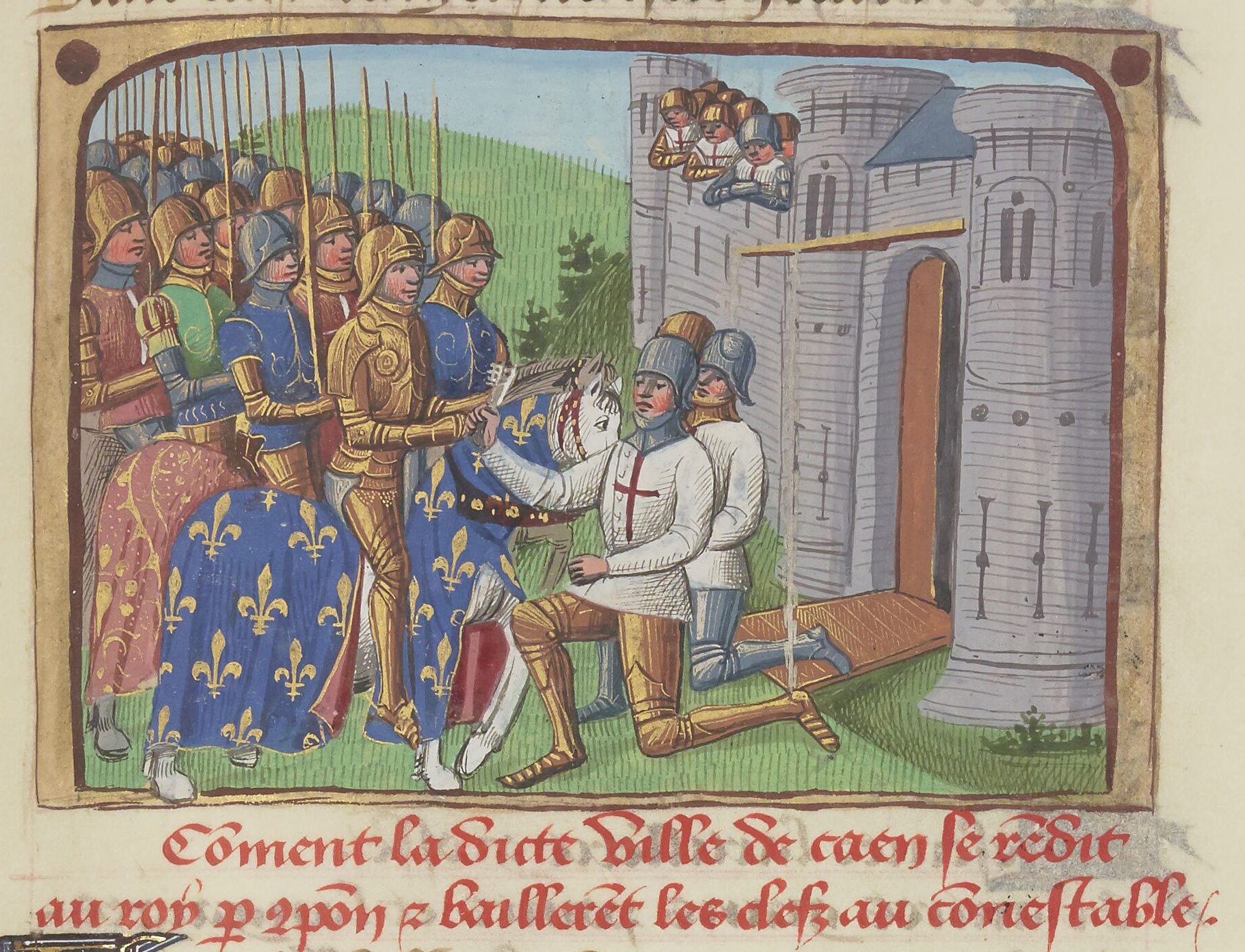
Surrender of Caen to Charles VII of France. Miniature from the Vigiles du roi Charles VII by Martial d'Auvergne, c. 1484.

Charles VII, wishing to preserve the public opinion of the bourgeois of Caen and, according to contemporary Norman historian Robert Blondel, to protect the city from destruction, refused to order an assault, preferring to await the English surrender. The effect of the bombardments and the undermining of Caen's walls assured Somerset of a French victory, and on 20 June, he requested to enter into negotiations. The treaty of surrender, signed on the 24th, stated that, if by midday on 1 July the English had received no help, they would have to surrender and hand over the city to the French; the English and their supporters would be free to leave for England or the places they still occupied on the continent. On the scheduled day, the Duke of Somerset handed Richemont the keys to Caen and, along with most of the English, was escorted to Ouistreham where they embarked for England over the following days.

== Aftermath ==
Even before the city's surrender, Charles VII guaranteed to the people of Caen the maintenance of their privileges and franchises. He made his solemn entry into the city on 6 July, surrounded by the captains who had besieged the city, with the exception of Richemont, who was in Ouistreham to oversee the English departure.

The loss of Caen sealed the fate of the English in Normandy, whose last position, Cherbourg, surrendered on 12 August 1450.

== See also ==
- Siege of Caen (1417)

== Sources ==
- Blondel, Robert (1893). "La Réduction de la Normandie". Oeuvres de Robert Blondel, historien normand du XVe siècle. Vol. 2. A. Lestringant.
- Hunger, Victor René (1912). Le siège et la prise de Caen par Charles VII en 1450. Paris: Impr. de Champon et Pailhé.
- Jaques, Tony (2007). Dictionary of Battles and Sieges: A-E. Greenwood Publishing Group.
- Neveux, François (2014). La bataille de Formigny dans la guerre de Cent Ans. L'Association normande et les assises de Caumont. p. 165. ISBN 978-2-9537313-3-0. ISSN 0755-2475.
- Sablon du Corail, Amable (2022). La Guerre de Cent Ans: Apprendre à vaincre. Paris: Passé composé. ISBN 9782379332166.
