= Matthew Gough =

Sir Matthew Gough (died 5 July 1450) was a Welsh soldier who served in the Hundred Years' War.

== Biography ==
Gough was a son of Owen Gough and Hawys Hanmer.

He is known to have taken part in the battles of Cravant (1423) and Verneuil (1424). He was subsequently in command of various towns and fortresses, including Laval, Saint Denis, Le Mans, Bellême, and Bayeux. In 1432 he was taken prisoner at Saint Denis.

Matthew as Captain of Bayeux, reinforced an English army in Normandy, under the command of Thomas Kyriell in 1450. A French army under the command of Jean de Bourbon, together with a force of Breton cavalry, under Arthur de Richemont, defeated the English army at the Battle of Formigny, with the remnants of Gough's force able to flee the battlefield.

Returning to England, Gough was placed in joint command of the Tower of London. Whilst defending the city against Jack Cade's rebels, he was killed upon London Bridge on 5 July 1450. He was buried in the choir of St. Mary's of the Carmelite Friars in London.

== Marriage and issue ==
He married Margaret, daughter of Rhys Moythe and Margaret Harley, they are known to have had the following known issue:

- Geoffrey Gough
- Mathew Gough
- David Gough
- Margaret Gough
