= John Norbury =

Lord High Treasurer of England

Arms of Norbury: Sable, a chevron between three bull's heads cabossed argent

John Norbury (died 1414) of Hoddesdon and Little Berkhamsted in Hertfordshire, was an English courtier, ambassador and Member of Parliament who served as Lord High Treasurer of England.

== Origins ==
He was a younger son of Thomas Norbury of Nantwich in Cheshire.

== Career ==
After serving as a soldier in France in the service of the Duke of Brittany in 1368 he was made deputy Captain of Brest (1382–1397) and Captain of Guînes (1399–1401) with responsibilities for maintaining the truce between England and France. He served as a Member of Parliament for Hertfordshire in 1391. During this time he allied himself with Henry Bolingbroke, the future King Henry IV.

When Bolingbroke ascended the throne Norbury was made Lord High Treasurer of England (1399–1401), Keeper of the Privy Wardrobe (1399–1405) and a member of the Privy Council. In 1406 he was acting as an ambassador to negotiate a further truce with the French.

== Marriages and children ==
He married twice:

- Firstly to a certain Petronilla, by whom he had issue including:
  - Joan Norbury, daughter;
  - Elizabeth Norbury, wife of John Hende, Lord Mayor of London, and of Ralph Boteler, 1st Baron Sudeley
- Secondly he married Elizabeth Butler, a daughter of Sir Thomas Butler, MP, and widow of Sir William Heron, jure uxoris Baron Saye, MP, of Eshott and East Duddoe, Northumberland, by whom he had issue including:
  - Sir Henry Norbury (d.1415), MP, who married Anne Croyser, widow of Ingelram Bruyn and daughter and heiress of William Croyser of Stoke d'Abernon in Surrey;
  - Sir John Norbury, MP.

== Death and burial ==
He died in 1414 and was buried at the Greyfriars, London.
