= Henry Norbury =

15th century English nobleman

Arms of Norbury: Sable, a chevron between three bull's heads cabossed argent

Henry Norbury (born 1415) of Hoddesdon and Little Berkhamsted in Hertfordshire, was an English soldier and nobleman who served as a Member of Parliament for Bedfordshire in 1454 and later again in 1454.

== Biography ==
Henry was eldest son and heir of John Norbury of Hoddesdon and Little Berkhamsted, by his wife Elizabeth Butler, a daughter of Sir Thomas Butler, MP, and widow of Sir William Heron, jure uxoris Baron Saye.

== Career ==
Henry left Portsmouth in Dec 1435 with a force of 1,000 men for France, as part of the relief force that relieved Rouen in 1436. In 1450 he was in command of a detachment at the siege of Valognes, and led a garrison force from Vire, Normandy and was taken prisoner at the Battle of Formigny.

He served as a Member of Parliament for Bedfordshire in 1454 and later again in 1454.

== Marriage and issue ==
He married Anne Croyser, widow of Ingelram Bruyn and daughter and heiress of William Croyser of Stoke d'Abernon in Surrey; By his wife he had issue including:

- Sir John Norbury , eldest son and heir, who married Jane/Joanna Gilbert, by whom he had a sole daughter and heiress Anne Norbury, who married Sir Richard Haleighwell of Halwell in Devon. Their daughter and sole heiress Jane Haleighwell married Edmund Braye, 1st Baron Braye.
- Ralph Norbury;
- Elizabeth Norbury, who married firstly William Sydney and secondly Thomas Uvedale.
- Cecily Norbury;
- Jane Norbury, who married Thomas Cruse;
- Rose Norbury, who married a member of the St John. family;
- Anne Norbury, who married Richard Hawkes.

== Death and burial ==
He was buried at the Greyfriars, London.
