= Oisseau =

- Commune
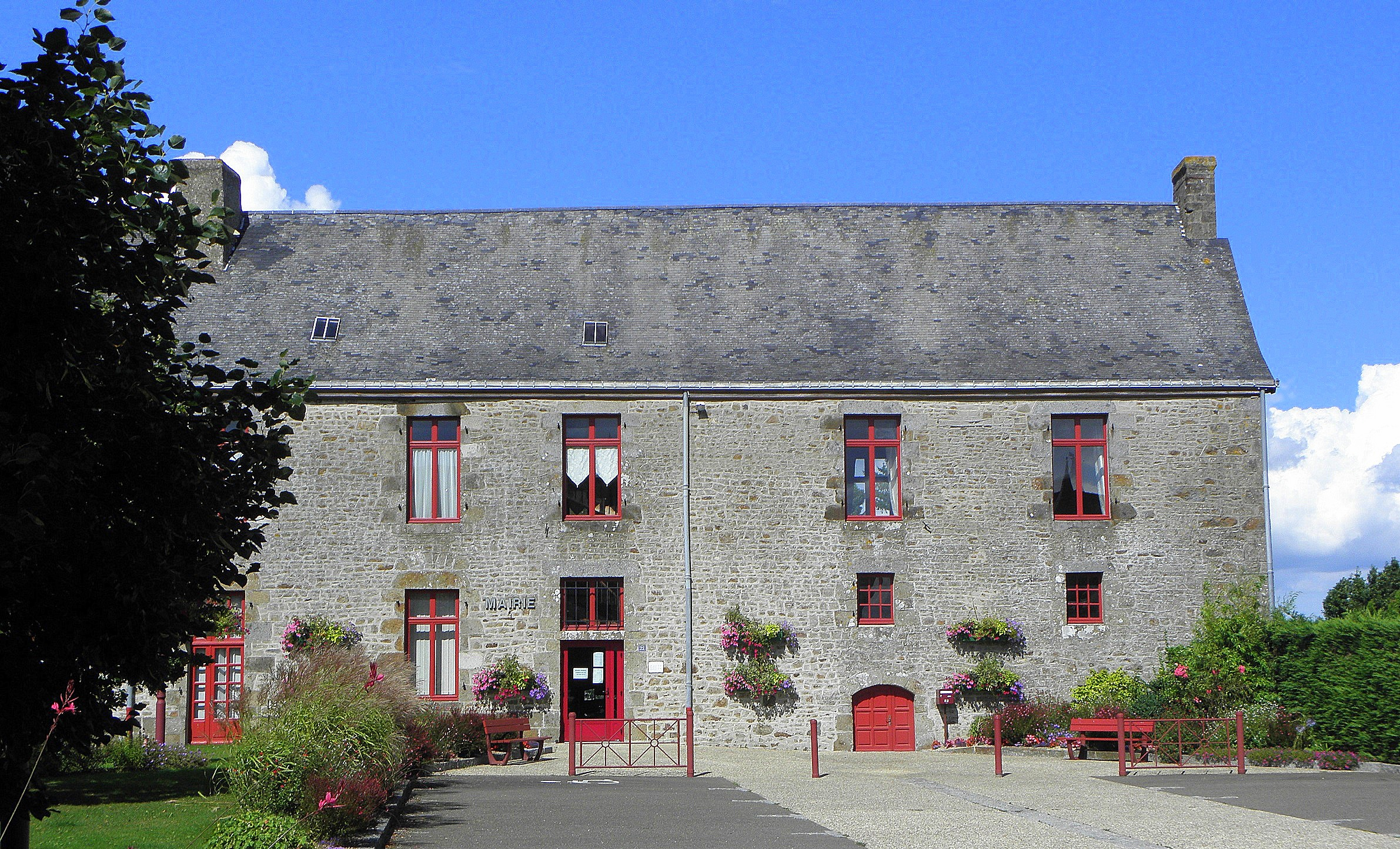
- The town hall in Oisseau

- Coat of arms
- Location of Oisseau
- Location within France Location within Pays de la Loire
- Coordinates: 48°21′27″N 0°40′10″W
- Country: France
- Region: Pays de la Loire
- Department: Mayenne
- Arrondissement: Mayenne
- Canton: Gorron

Government
  - Mayor (2020–2026): Stéphane Manceau
- Area^{1}: 30.75 km^{2} (11.87 sq mi)
- Elevation: 163 m (535 ft)
- Highest elevation: 190 m (620 ft)
- Lowest elevation: 98 m (322 ft)
- Population (2023): 1,136
  - Density: 36.94/km^{2} (95.68/sq mi)
- Time zone: UTC+01:00 (CET)
  - Summer (DST): UTC+02:00 (CEST)
- INSEE/Postal code: 53170 /53300
- ^{1} French Land Register data, which excludes lakes, ponds, glaciers > 1 km^{2} (0.386 sq mi or 247 acres) and river estuaries.

Oisseau (French pronunciation: [waso]) is a commune in the Mayenne department in north-western France.

== See also ==
- Communes of Mayenne
