= Siege of Caen (1417) =

English Hundred Years War victory

- Part of the Hundred Years' War
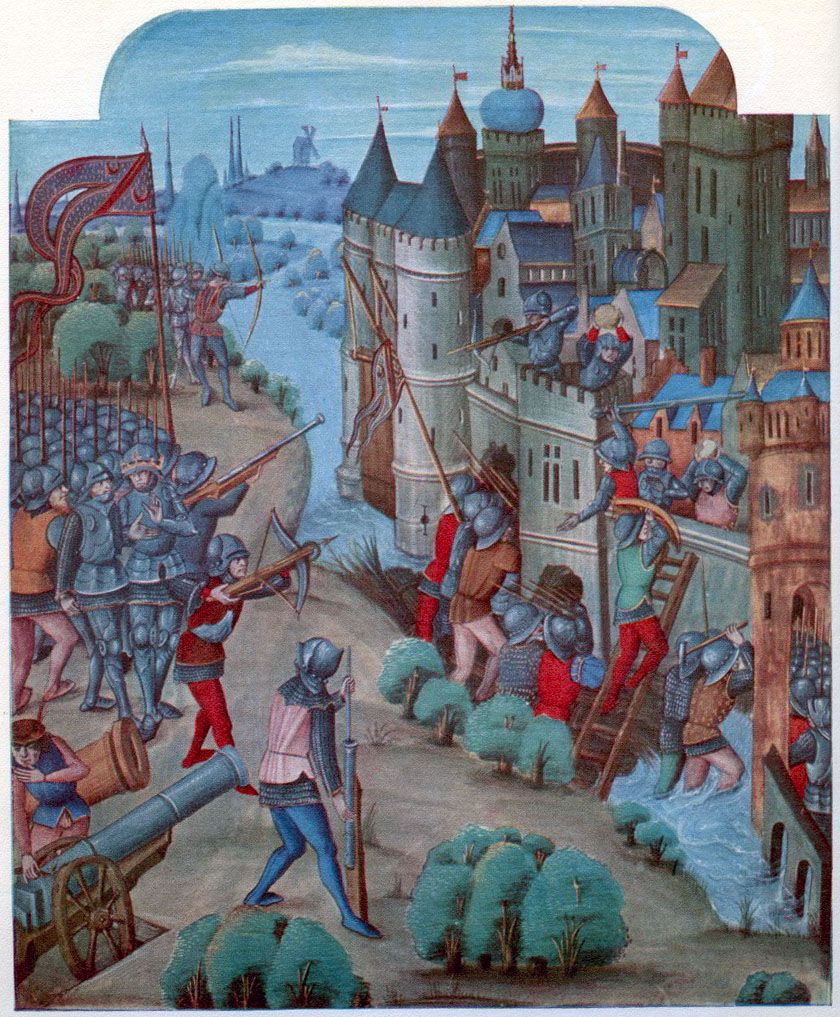
- English assault during an anonymous siege in the early 15th century. Note the use of cannons, fascines to cross the moat, and a climbing ladder.
| Date | 14 August – 20 September 1417 |
| Location | Caen, Normandy 49.18°N 0.37°W |
| Result | English victory. Caen surrenders |

Belligerents
| Kingdom of England | Kingdom of France |

Commanders and leaders
| Henry V Thomas, Duke of Clarence | Guillaume de Montenay |

The siege of Caen took place during the Hundred Years War when English forces under King Henry V laid siege to and captured Caen in Normandy from its French defenders.

== Background ==
Following his victory at Agincourt in 1415, Henry had returned to England. The battle, although ensuring that the French would not face the English in open battle again, had not furthered Henry's claim to the French throne, and he therefore set about raising another, even larger, army. In March 1417 at Southampton, Henry began to assemble a force of some 12,000 men at arms and archers, together with about 30,000 supporting men; gunners, engineers, miners, armourers and other auxiliaries. A huge quantity of stores included all kinds of siege engines, artillery and gunpowder. On 23 July, the whole force began to embark on a fleet estimated at 1,500 ships, finally setting sail for France on 30 July.

== The siege ==
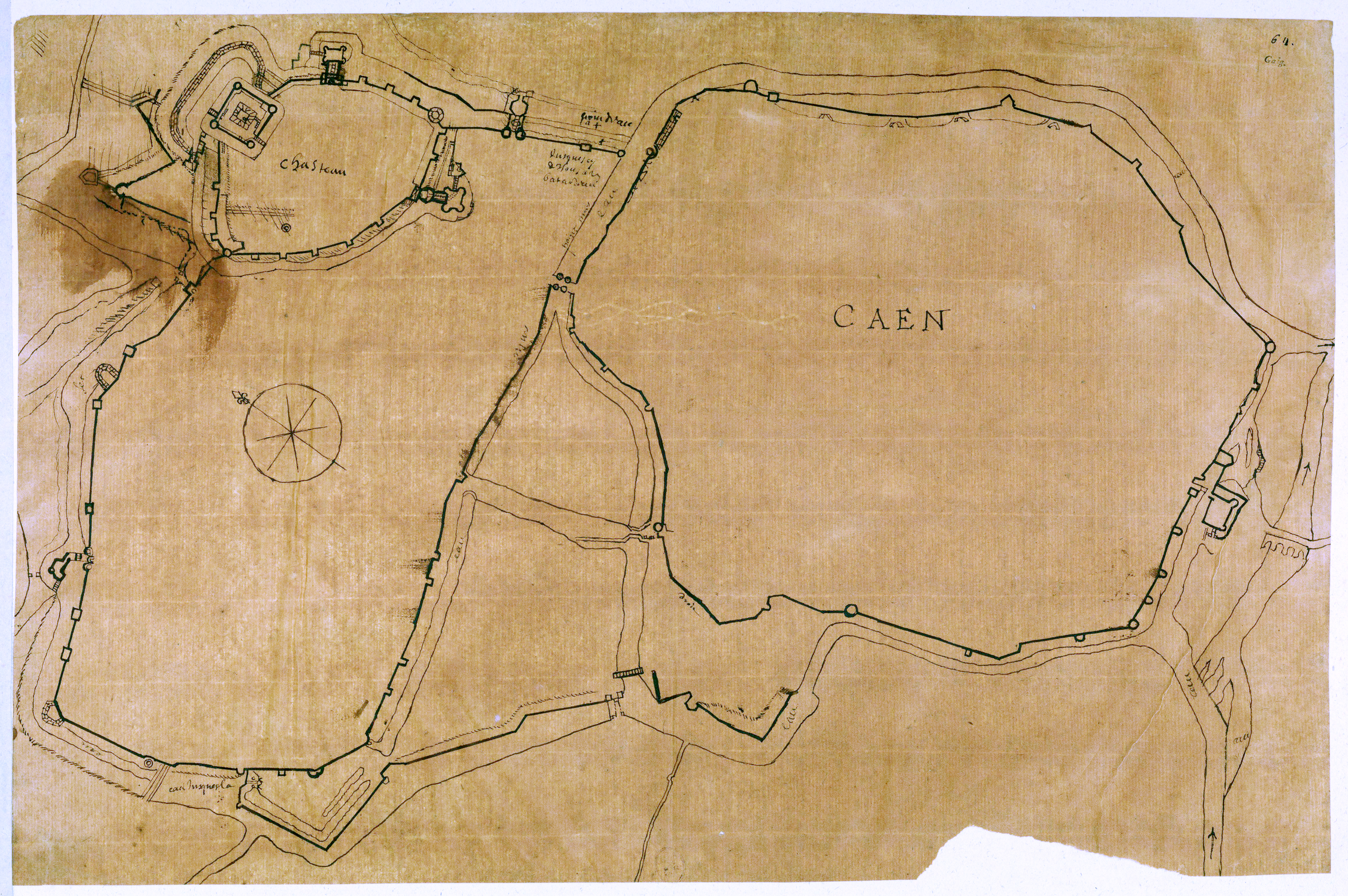
A 16th-century drawing of the fortifications of Caen, showing the upper town and castle on the left and the lower town, surrounded by a loop in the River Orne, on the right.

The English army landed on the coast of Normandy near Deauville. Henry's plan was to capture and garrison the major cities and towns of Lower Normandy, before moving on towards Paris. His first objective was the city of Caen, the second largest in Normandy with a population of up to 40,000. The recently improved defensive walls had a total of twelve gatehouses and thirty two towers. The upper or old town with its castle, the Chateau de Caen, stood on a hill, overlooking the lower or new town, which was almost completely surrounded by a loop in the River Orne. The French garrison began demolishing buildings outside of the walls to avoid giving cover to the attackers, however two large monasteries were still being prepared for demolition when the English vanguard, led by Thomas of Lancaster, Duke of Clarence, arrived. Clarence took over the Abbey of Sainte-Trinité as his headquarters. A story says that a monk from the other monastery, the Abbey of Saint-Étienne or Abbaye aux Hommes ("Men's Abbey"), came to Clarence at night, begged him not to allow the French troops to destroy the church and offered to show him a way over the abbey walls. The abbey, which had a commanding view over the town, was captured and Henry later installed guns on the roof.

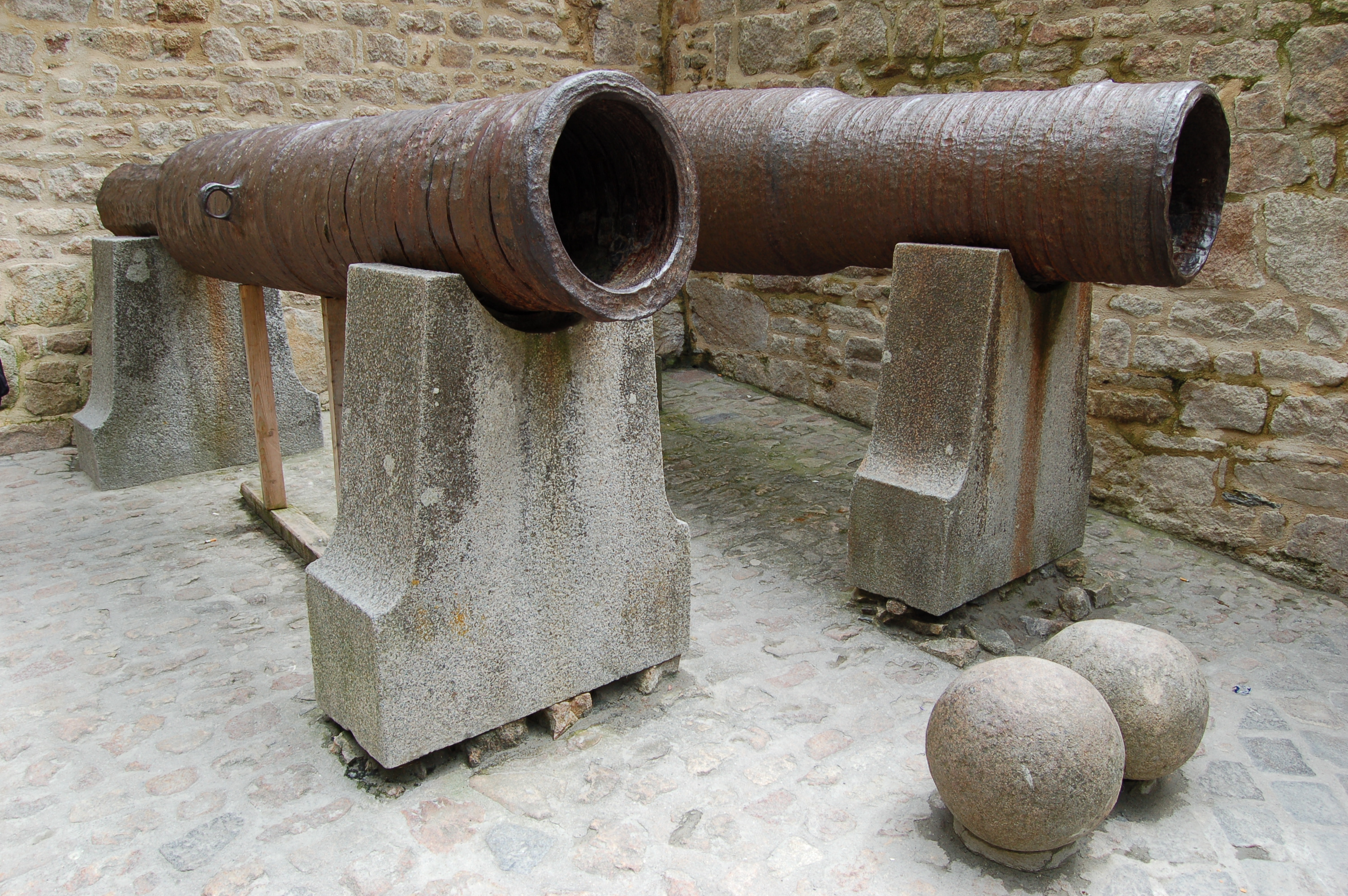
English cannon or bombards of the early 15th century, with their stone cannonballs.

Having installed a prefabricated bridge over the river, Henry began the siege on 18 August with an artillery barrage on the lower town. The English cannon were so large that the shock of firing broke the abbey windows. The larger guns fired solid stone balls or hollow iron shells filled with combustible material, while the smaller guns fired showers of lead shot. Henry also attempted to undermine the walls, but the defenders set up bowls of water on the ramparts so that by observing the ripples, they could detect the English digging and countermine, fighting the attackers underground.

The commander of the French garrison, Guillaume de Montenay, having refused to surrender, Henry planned an assault on 4 September. The attack was mounted on the lower town from two opposite directions, one led by the king and one by the Duke of Clarence. After crossing the moat by filling it with fascines, the English scaling ladders proved to be too short and the wall was only crossed with considerable difficulty, against the efforts of the defenders, who showered them with quicklime, rocks and boiling water. In the course of the siege, an English knight, Sir Edward Sprenghose, managed to scale the walls, but fell and was burned alive by the city's defenders, who threw burning straw down on him. Thomas Walsingham wrote that this was one of the factors in the violence with which the captured town was sacked by the English. Clarence's men broke through first, a soldier called Harry Ingles being the first over the wall. After fierce house to house fighting led by Richard Beauchamp, 13th Earl of Warwick shouting "A Clarence, a Clarence, a St George!", were able to clear the defenders from the ramparts and open the gates for the king's men to enter. The rules of war at that time meant that a garrison that refused to surrender was at the mercy of the successful attackers. English chroniclers are at pains to praise Henry, who ordered that no women or priest should be harmed or churches plundered; however, his men forced anyone they could find into the market place, where they massacred between 1,800 and 2,000 people. According to one account, Henry ordered a halt to the killing when he came across the headless body of a woman with a baby in her lap. His soldiers were then turned loose to pillage the town.

The castle, encumbered with by a thousand refugees from the earlier fighting, surrendered on 20 September without being either bombarded or assaulted. De Montenay handed over the keys to Henry, who gave generous terms to the defenders. The soldiers were allowed to leave with their horses, arms, equipment and up to 2,000 écus of coin each. Civilians were allowed to leave with only the clothes they were wearing, or they could stay and swear fealty to Henry. About 700 citizens are known to have left the city, and de Montenay and his soldiers went on to join the defenders of Falaise.

== Aftermath ==
While the siege was still in progress, Clarence had written to the Lord Mayor of London saying that English settlers would be required to populate the town and when they later arrived, they were allocated vacant houses to live in. In the following months, Henry went on to capture Argentan, Falaise and Cherbourg. Turning east, he then besieged Rouen, then considered to be France's second city. The desperate Siege of Rouen lasted from July until January 1419, but its capture secured the whole of Normandy as a base from which he could press on towards Paris. Henry finally died in 1422 at the Siege of Meaux. Caen remained in English hands until 1450 when it was besieged and taken back during the French reconquest of Normandy in the closing stages of the war.

== Bibliography ==
- Barker, Juliet (2012). Conquest: The English Kingdom of France, 1417-1450. Cambridge MA: Harvard University Press. ISBN 978-0674065604.
- Bradbury, Jim (1992). The Medieval Siege. Woodbridge, Suffolk: Boydell Press. ISBN 978-0851153575.
- Jaques, Tony (2007), Dictionary of Battles and Sieges: A-E. Greenwood Publishing Group.
- Matusiak, John (2012). Henry V. London: Routledge. ISBN 978-0415620277.
- Mortimer, Ian (2009). 1415: Henry V's Year of Glory. The Bodley Head. ISBN 978-0224079921.
- Sumption, Jonathan (2016). The Hundred Years War, Volume 4: Cursed Kings. London: Faber & Faber. ISBN 978-0571274567.
- Taylor, Craig (10 October 2013). Chivalry and the Ideals of Knighthood in France During the Hundred Years War. Cambridge University Press. p. 197. ISBN 978-1-107-04221-6.
- Wylie, James Hamilton (1929). The reign of Henry the Fifth: Volume II. Cambridge University Press.
