= Battle of Formigny =

1450 battle of the Hundred Years' War

Coordinates: 49°20′N 0°54′W

- Part of the Hundred Years' War
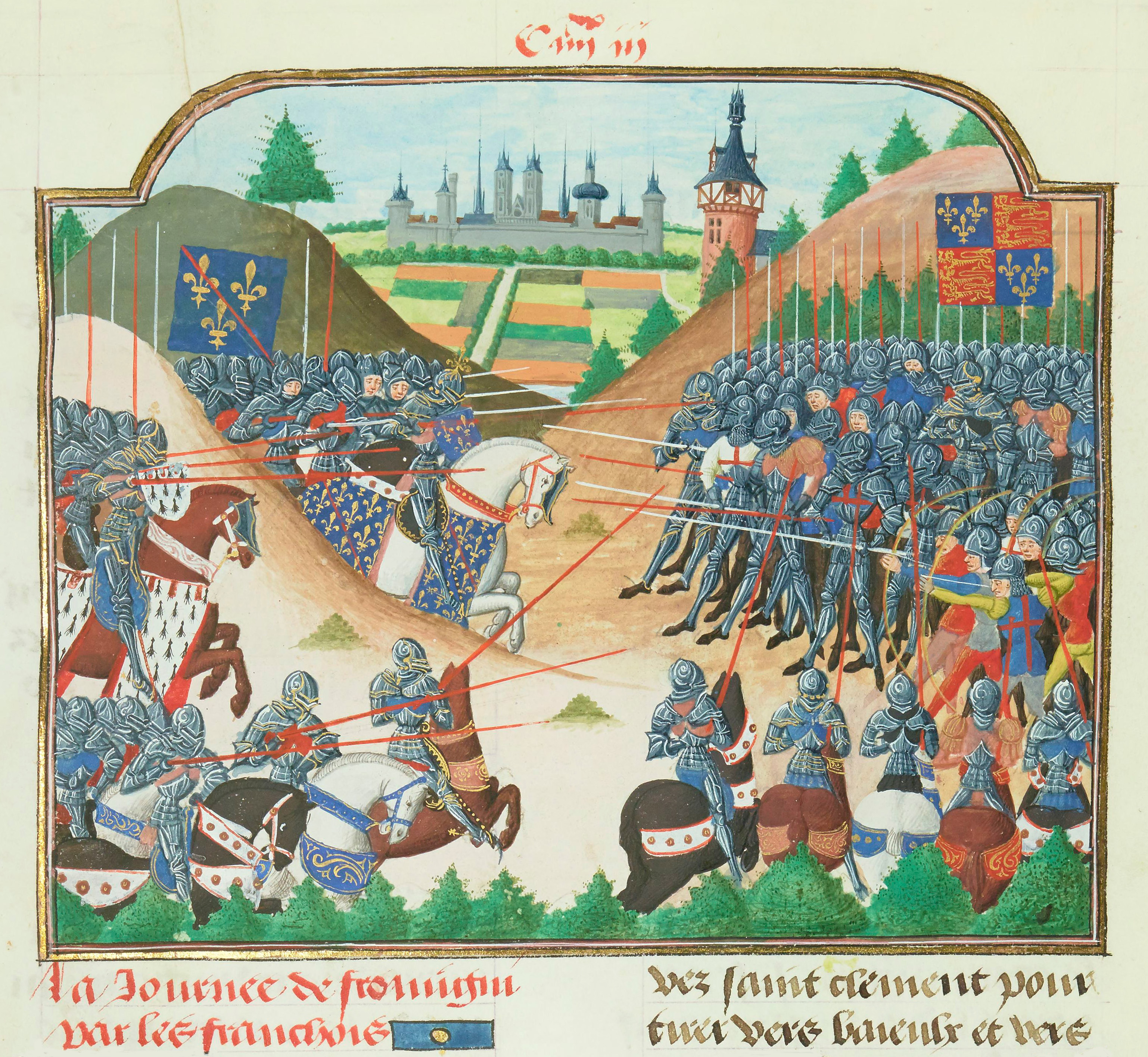
- Illumination adorning La Cronicque du temps de Tres Chrestien Roy Charles, septisme de ce nom, roy de France by Jean Chartier, c. 1470–1479
Date	15 April 1450
Location	Formigny, Normandy, France
Result	French and Breton victory

Belligerents
Kingdom of France; Duchy of Brittany	Kingdom of England

Commanders and leaders
Jean de Clermont; Arthur de Richemont; Pierre de Brézé	Thomas Kyriell (surrendered); Robert Vere; Matthew Gough; Henry Norbury (surrendered)

Strength
c. 4,200 (Note: 3,000 French, 1,200 Breton cavalry)	c. 4,000 to 4,300

Casualties and losses
500 to 1,000 killed or wounded (Note: Contemporary accounts claimed 8 dead)	Vast majority killed or captured

The Battle of Formigny, fought on 15 April 1450, took place towards the end of the Hundred Years' War between England and France. A decisive French victory that destroyed the last significant English field army in Normandy, it paved the way for the recapture of their remaining strongholds.

Although cannon had been employed in siege warfare since the early 14th century, Formigny is notable as one of the first recorded uses of field artillery on a European battlefield.

== Background ==
Charles VII of France used the time afforded by the 1444 Treaty of Tours to reorganise and reinvigorate his armies. In contrast, the English were divided by the internal struggle for power that would lead to the Wars of the Roses beginning in 1455. Inability to agree a coherent strategy left their forces in Normandy scattered and dangerously weak.

As a result, the French were in a much stronger position when they broke the truce in June 1449. By August, they had taken Pont-Audemer, Pont-L'Evêque and Lisieux, and by October had occupied much of Normandy. Cutting north and east, the Bureau brothers captured Rouen in October, Harfleur in December, then Honfleur and Fresnoy in January 1450, before investing Caen.

During the winter of 1449, the English assembled an expeditionary force in Portsmouth to relieve Caen. It was led by Sir Thomas Kyriell, a relatively unknown commander who would be comprehensively out manoeuvred by his French opponents. Lack of money and supplies hampered recruiting and lowered morale; in January 1450 the troops lynched an official sent to negotiate with them over pay.

On 15 March 1450, Kyriell and some 2,500 men landed in Cherbourg, where they were reinforced by another 1,800 collected by Edmund Beaufort, 2nd Duke of Somerset, English commander in Normandy. He did so by taking them from English garrisons in Bayeux, Caen, and Vire, under Sir Matthew Gough, Sir Robert Vere and Sir Henry Norbury respectively.

== Battle ==
Rather than immediately relieving Caen as originally planned, Kyriell attacked Valognes, whose possession allowed the French to isolate Cherbourg from the rest of the Cotentin Peninsula. It fell on 27 March after a short siege, and Kyriell continued onto French-held Carentan, which he reached on 12 April. Despite a number of small skirmishes, Clermont, the local French commander, refused to give battle, so Kyriell instead marched for Bayeux. He stopped near Formigny on 14 April, closely followed by 3,000 men from Carentan under Clermont. On the same day, the Constable of France, Arthur de Richemont, arrived in Saint-Lô with a Breton force of 2,000, split between 1,200 cavalry and 800 infantry. Having made contact, Clermont urged him to move on Formigny as soon as possible.

Key locations; Normandy campaign 1449 to 1450

On 15 April, the English sighted Clermont, and the armies took up positions facing each other on the Carentan-Bayeux road, near a small tributary of the Aure. Now totalling somewhat less than 4,000 men, of whom 2,900 were archers, the English assembled in two main "battles" across the road to Carentan, with their backs to the stream. Although they did not have time to construct the usual defence works of sharpened stakes, Kyriell was confident since he outnumbered Clermont, and was unaware of Richemont's proximity.

Pausing to assess the situation, in the early afternoon Clermont ordered his dismounted men at arms to attack the English position. These assaults were repulsed, as were two French cavalry probes of their flanks, and Clermont then instructed his two culverins to open fire. Since the guns were out of bowshot range, the English archers were unable to respond, and left their positions in an attempt to capture them. Around 7:00 pm, Richemont and his 1,200 cavalry arrived from the south, crossing the Aure and threatening the English flank. Encouraged by the presence of the French king's most influential advisor, Pierre de Brézé, Clermont's forces stood their ground.

With many of his men busy dragging the captured guns back to their lines, Kyriell shifted forces to the left to face the new threat, while Clermont responded by renewing his attack. The English were caught in the open by the Breton cavalry, then enveloped by French troops under Clermont and Brézé. Attacked from both sides, they were split into small groups and suffered heavy casualties. The vast majority were either killed or captured, including Kyriell, although Sir Matthew Gough and a small party escaped to Bayeux.

One contemporary French writer claimed that despite protests from their commanders, after the battle about 500 captured English archers were massacred. Their corpses were reportedly buried in a nearby field, later dubbed "The English Tomb".

== Aftermath ==
Kyriell's army was effectively destroyed, the vast majority either killed or taken prisoner. Contemporary French records claim 3,744 bodies were buried, although this seems to have included casualties from both sides. The same sources suggest another 1,200 to 1,400 were taken prisoner, while other historians suggest 2,500 killed and 900 captured. Estimates of French and Breton losses vary from "less than a thousand", to "about 500", or "a handful". The victors quickly recaptured the whole of Normandy, Caen falling on 12 June, and Cherbourg on 12 August.

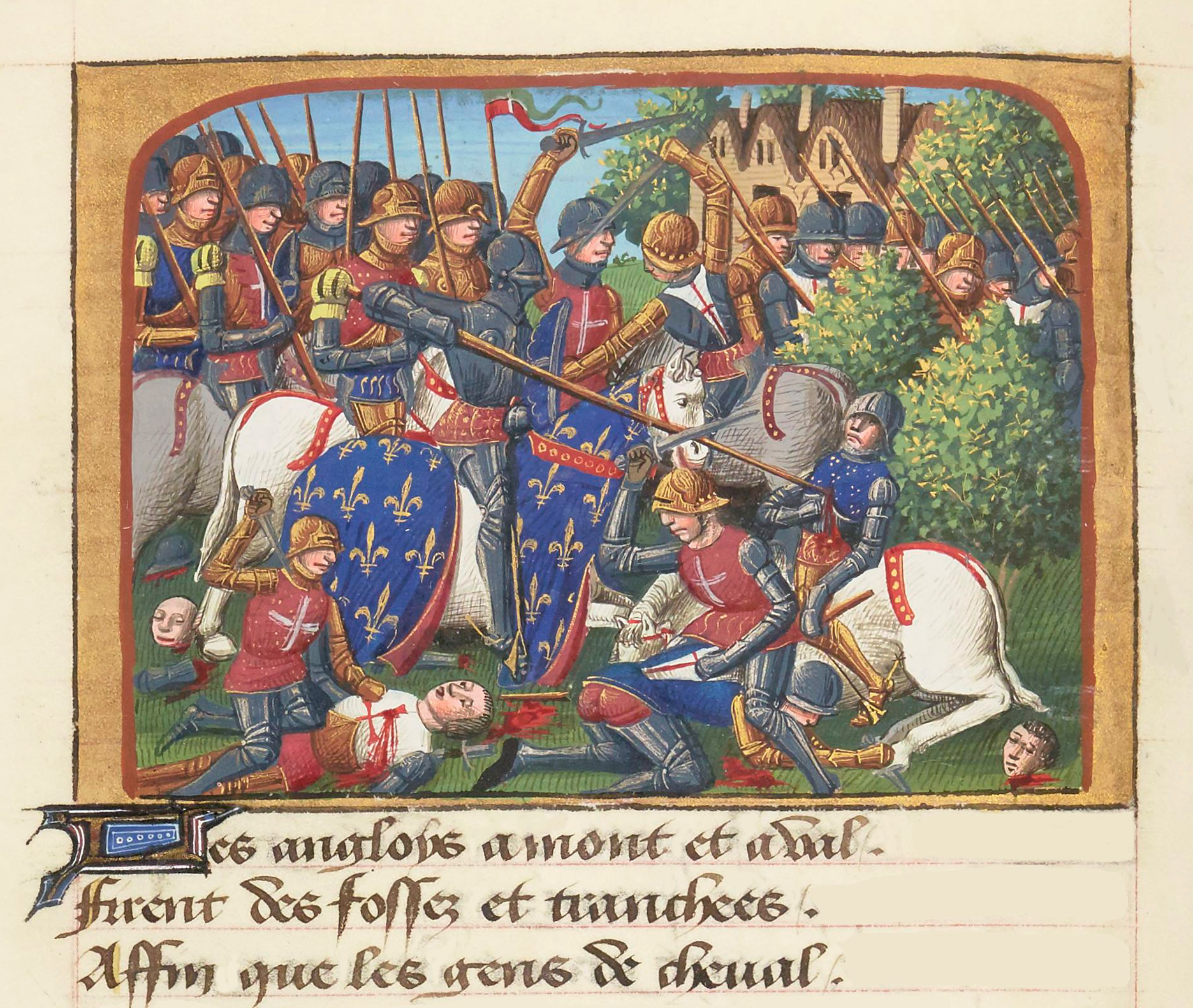
The Battle of Formigny from Les Vigiles de Charles VII by Martial d'Auvergne, 1484

Prior to 1450, artillery had largely been employed in siege warfare, with Formigny perhaps the first engagement when cannon are recorded as being used on the battlefield. Unlike the better known Battle of Castillon, contemporary accounts are unclear on how effective they were. The arrival of the Breton cavalry was arguably more decisive in forcing the English to leave their prepared defensive positions, although the French guns also played a role.

Most significantly, the noise of their firing alerted Richemont to the fact that a battle was taking place and its rough location, so causing his appearance on the field. One of Clermont's captains claimed that if Richemont had not arrived when he did, their army would have suffered "irreparable damage". (Note: Je crois que Dieu nous amena monsieur le connétable, car s'il ne fust venu à l'heure et par la manière qu'il y vint, je doubte que entre nous [...] n'en fusions jamais sortis sans dommage irréparable, car ils estoient de la moitié plus que nous n'estions)

== Images ==
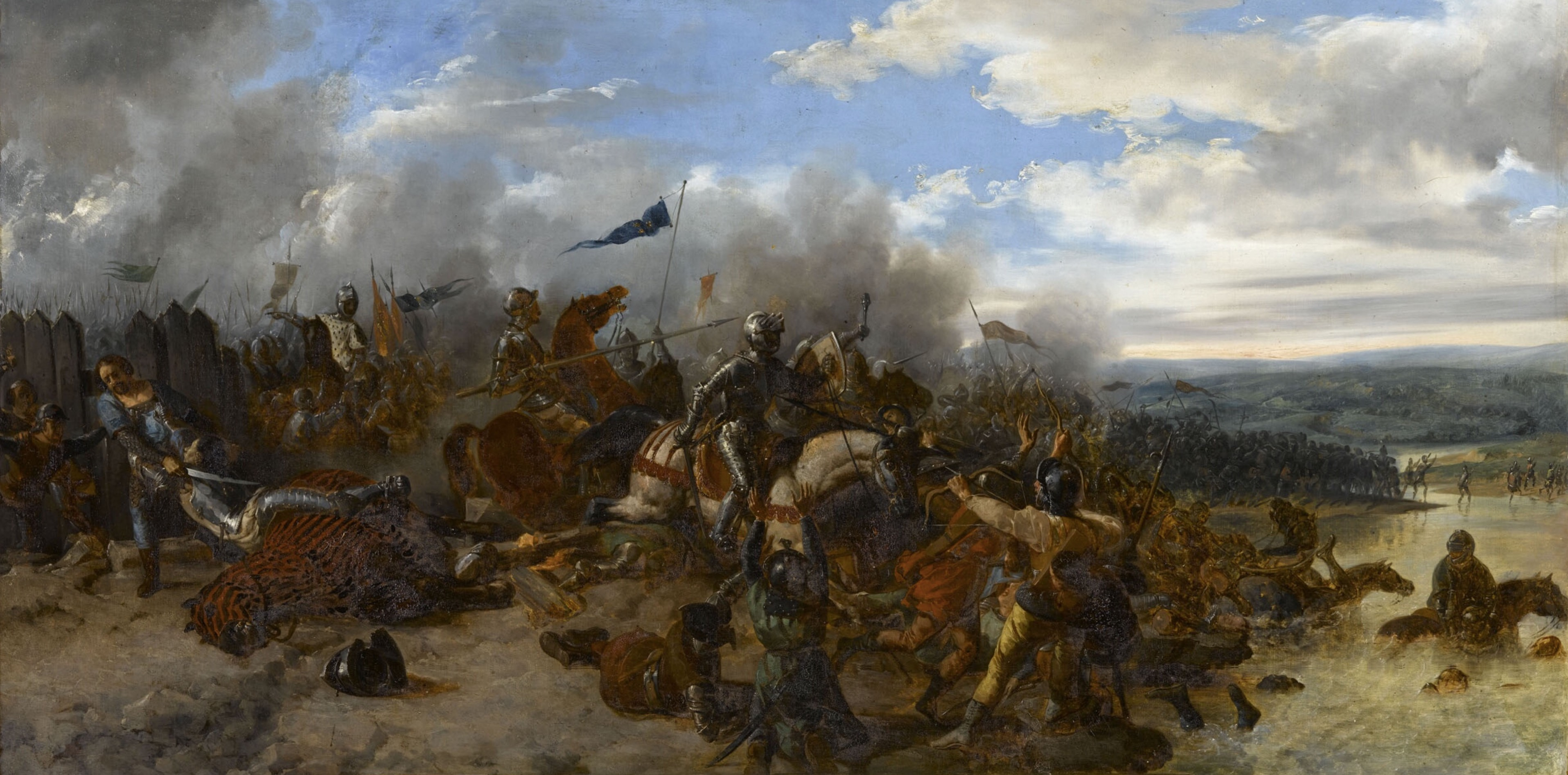
Bataille de Formigny, 18 avril 1450, oil on canvas by Prosper Lafaye, 1837, Palace of Versailles

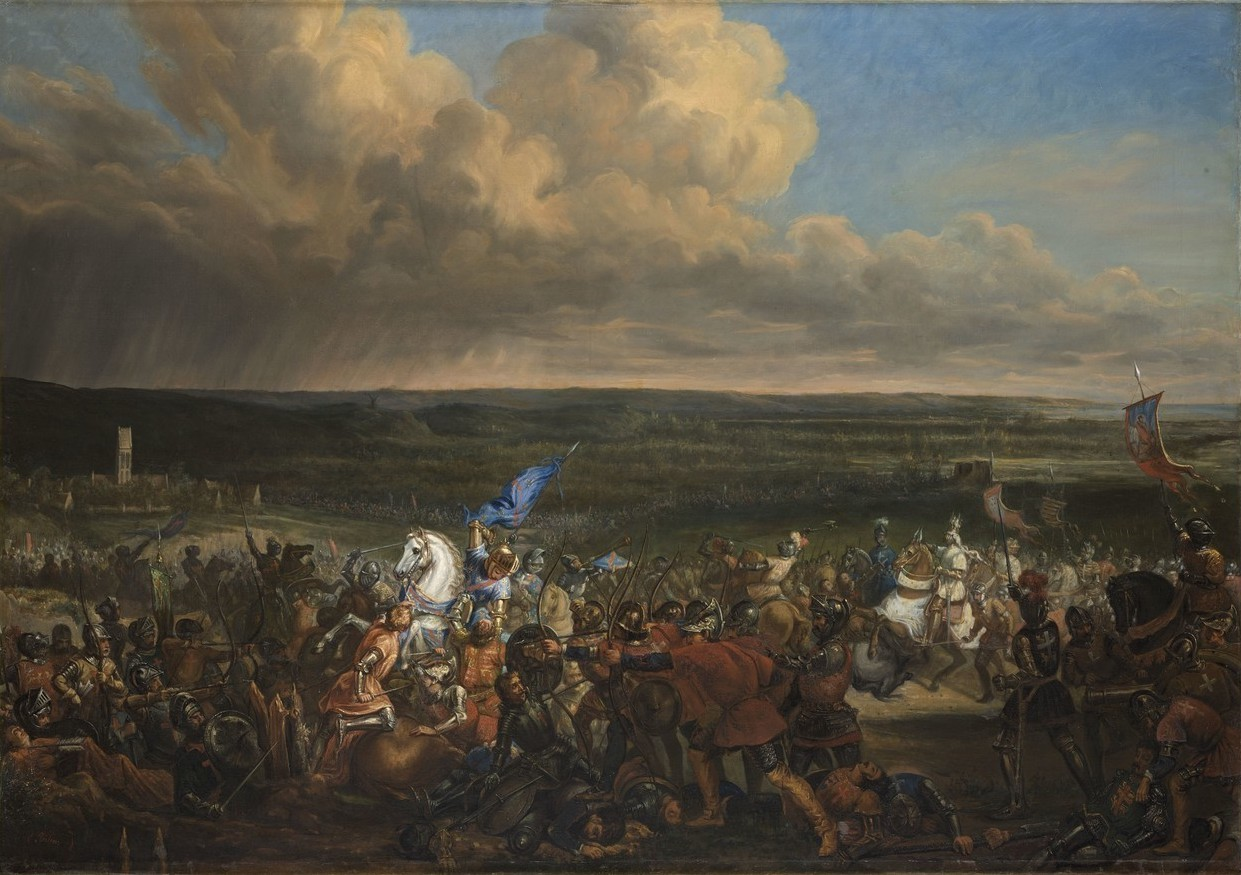
Bataille de Formigny, oil on canvas by Rémy-Eugène Julien

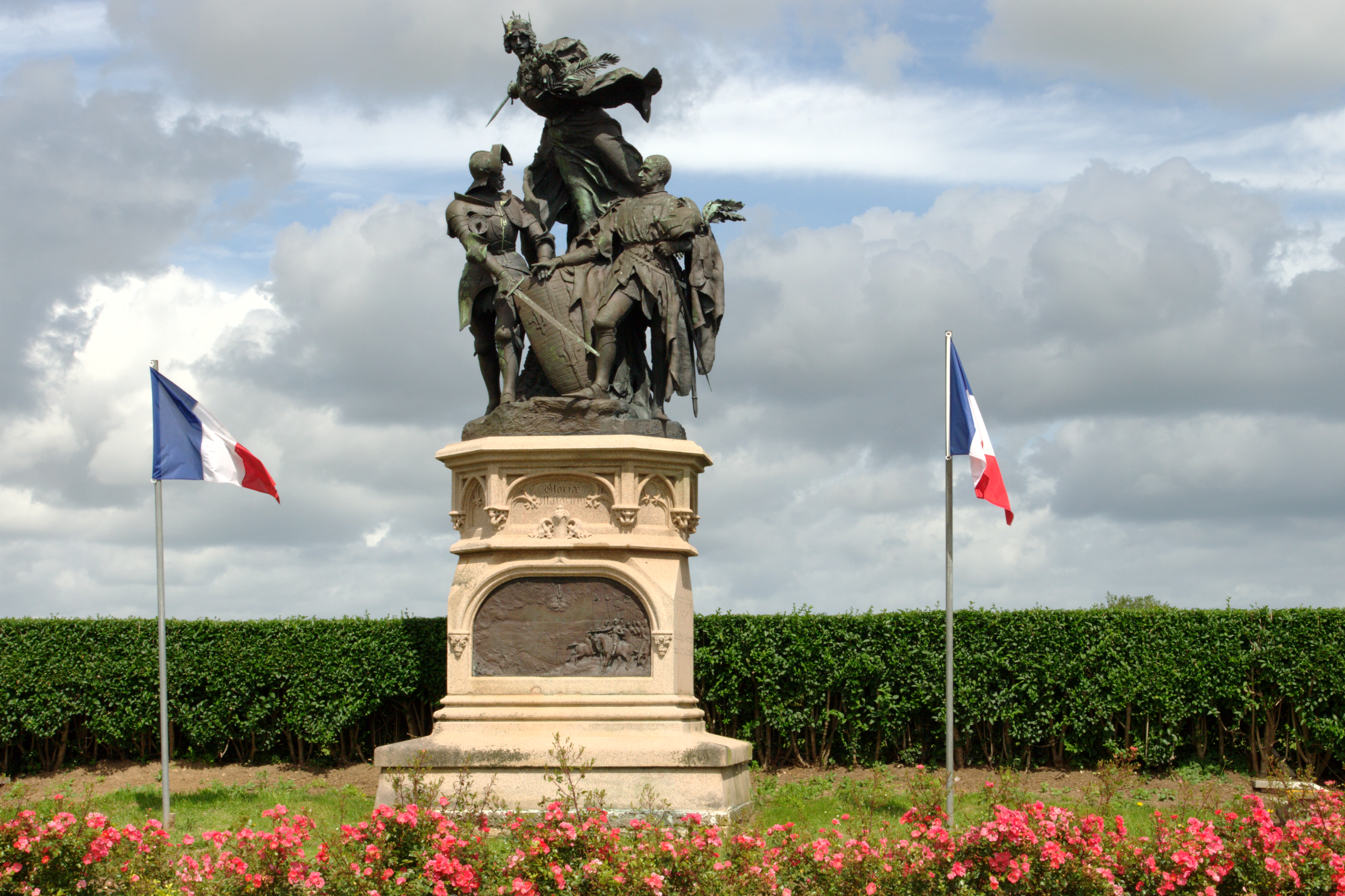
Monument to the Battle of Formigny

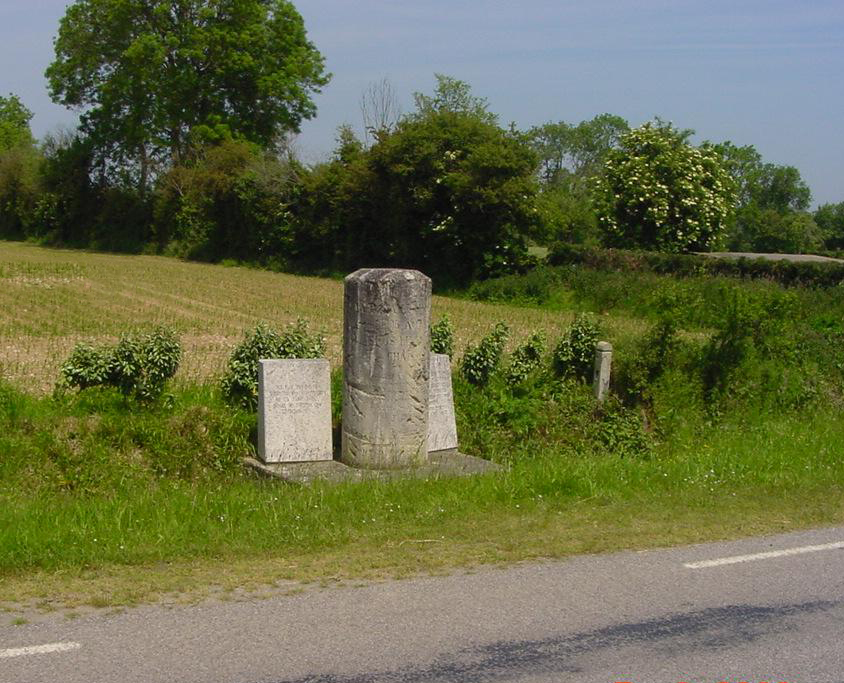
A Memorial marks the Battlefield

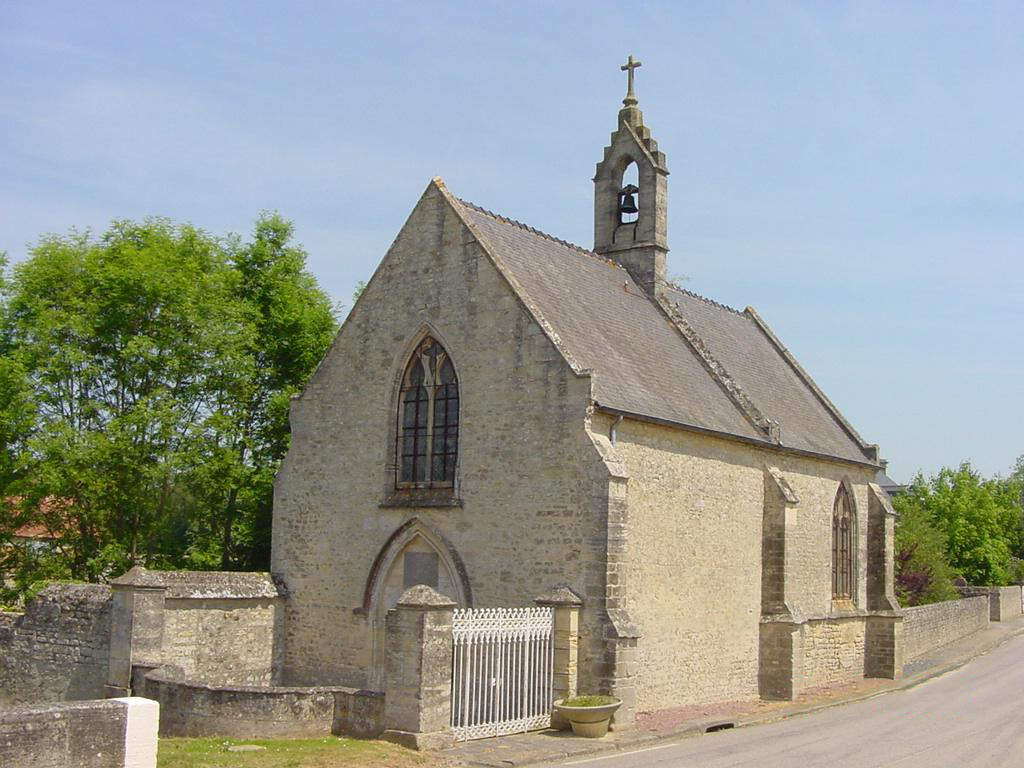
The chapel that Clermont had constructed in 1486 to commemorate the victory

== Sources ==
- Barker, Juliet R. V (2012). Conquest : the English kingdom of France, 1417–1450. Harvard Univ Pr. ISBN 978-0674065604.
- Bernage, George (2000). "15 Avril 1450, la bataille de Formigny". Moyen Âge (in French).
- Bradbury, Jim (1992). The Medieval Siege. Boydell & Brewer.
- Chiaventone, Fred (2019). "'Vile guns': how artillery ended the Hundred Years' War". The Past.
- Guy, Le Hallé (2015). Châteaux forts de Basse-Normandie (in French). Vol. II. Ysec Éditions. ISBN 978-284673-215-4.
- Joret, Charles (1903). La bataille de Formigny, d'après les documents contemporains, étude accompagnée d'une carte (in French). Paris: Émile Bouillon.
- Nicolle, David (2012). The Fall of English France 1449–53. Bloomsbury Publishing.
- Périni, Hardy de (1894). Batailles françaises 1ère série (in French). Flammarion.
- Roberts, William J. (2004). France: A Reference Guide from the Renaissance to the Present. Infobase Publishing.
- Rogers, Clifford (2010). The Oxford Encyclopedia of Medieval Warfare and Military Technology: Volume 1. Oxford University Press. ISBN 978-0195334036.
- Royle, Trevor (2010). The Wars Of The Roses: England's First Civil War. Abacus. ISBN 978-0349117904.
- Tucker, Spencer C., ed. (2010). The Global Chronology of Conflict: Volume One: ca. 3000 BCE – 1499 CE. ABC-CLIO.
- Wagner, John A. (2006). Encyclopedia of the Hundred Years War. Greenwood Publishing Group. ISBN 978-0313327360.
