= Thomas Kyriell =

Member of the Parliament of England

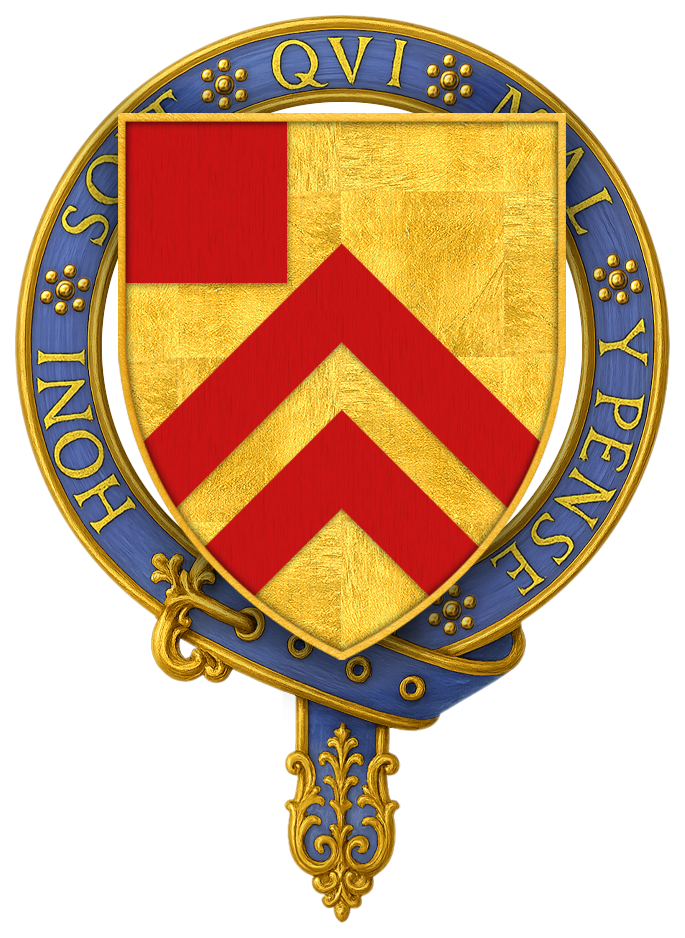
Coat of arms of Sir Thomas Kyriell

Sir Thomas Kyriell (1396 – 18 February 1461) was an English soldier of the Hundred Years' War and the opening of the Wars of the Roses. He was executed after the Second Battle of St. Albans.

== Background ==
The de Criol, Kyriel or Kyriell family built up a position in Kent, where they fortified Westenhanger Castle, from the middle of the 14th century.

== Military career ==
Kyriell served under Henry V of England in Normandy, and in 1436 held the fortress at Le Crotoy in Picardy. He served under John, Lord Talbot at this period, around Rouen, and was created knight-banneret by 1443. He led the English forces in the 1450 French victory, the Battle of Formigny.

Released after being captured at Formigny, Kyriell was a Member of Parliament, representing Kent in the Parliaments of 1455–56 and 1460–61. There he showed himself a Yorkist, by his opposition to Edmund Beaufort, 2nd Duke of Somerset. He was openly a Yorkist commander by 1460, as heavy fighting began in the Wars of the Roses. Warwick the Kingmaker had Kyriell elected to the Order of the Garter on 8 February 1461, with himself and two others.

At the Second Battle of St. Albans, eight days later, Kyriell was on the losing side captured while guarding the king, Henry VI of England, who was a Yorkist prisoner. Margaret of Anjou had Edward of Westminster, Prince of Wales pronounce the fate of the Yorkist guard, and they were beheaded.

== Family ==
Kyriel married Cicely, daughter of the Somerset Member of Parliament John Stourton, whose first husband was John Hill of Spaxton.

On his death without male issue, his two daughters became his co-heiresses. Elizabeth, married to John Bourchier, Esq., and Alice, married to John Fogge, Esq. of Repton, afterwards knighted. The manor of Westenhanger was allotted to the latter, while Elizabeth got Stockbury. Elizabeth survived her husband and was still living in 14th year of Henry VII, 1498/9.
