= 1462 =

Calendar year

1462 in various calendars
- Gregorian calendar: 1462; MCDLXII
- Ab urbe condita: 2215
- Armenian calendar: 911; ԹՎ ՋԺԱ
- Assyrian calendar: 6212
- Balinese saka calendar: 1383–1384
- Bengali calendar: 868–869
- Berber calendar: 2412
- English Regnal year: 1 Edw. 4 – 2 Edw. 4
- Buddhist calendar: 2006
- Burmese calendar: 824
- Byzantine calendar: 6970–6971
- Chinese calendar: 辛巳年 (Metal Snake); 4159 or 3952 — to — 壬午年 (Water Horse); 4160 or 3953
- Coptic calendar: 1178–1179
- Discordian calendar: 2628
- Ethiopian calendar: 1454–1455
- Hebrew calendar: 5222–5223
- Hindu calendars
- Vikram Samvat: 1518–1519
- Shaka Samvat: 1383–1384
- Kali Yuga: 4562–4563
- Holocene calendar: 11462
- Igbo calendar: 462–463
- Iranian calendar: 840–841
- Islamic calendar: 866–867
- Japanese calendar: Kanshō 3 (寛正３年)
- Javanese calendar: 1378–1379
- Julian calendar: 1462; MCDLXII
- Korean calendar: 3795
- Minguo calendar: 450 before ROC 民前450年
- Nanakshahi calendar: −6
- Thai solar calendar: 2004–2005
- Tibetan calendar: ལྕགས་མོ་སྦྲུལ་ལོ་ (female Iron-Snake); 1588 or 1207 or 435 — to — ཆུ་ཕོ་རྟ་ལོ་ (male Water-Horse); 1589 or 1208 or 436

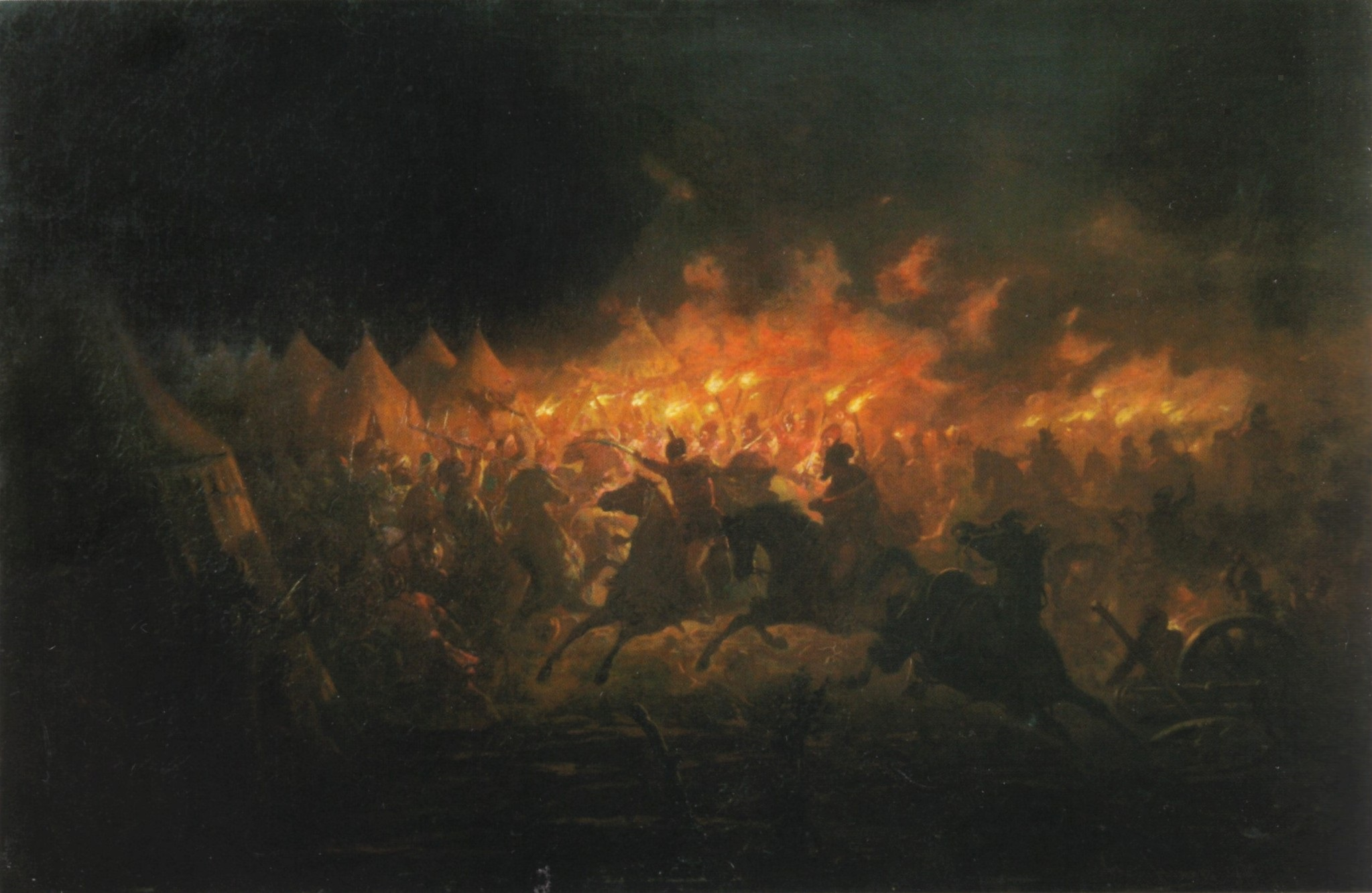
June 17: Vlad III Dracula stages "The Night Attack" on the encampent of the Ottoman Army in an attempt to assassinate the Sultan of the Ottoman Empire.(painting Atacul de Noapte by Theodor Aman, 1866)

Year 1462 (MCDLXII) was a common year starting on Friday of the Julian calendar.

== Events ==
=== January–March ===
- January 16 – The conflict in Poland over who should be the bishop of Krakow — Pope Pius II's appointee Jakub of Sienno or King Casimir IV's pick, Jan Gruszczynski — Pope Pius sends his legate, the Archbishop of Crete Hieronymus Landus, to negotiate a compromise that ultimately ends with Jakub being recognized by King Casimir as Bishop.<
- January 22 – On Saint Vincent's Day, Portuguese explorer Diogo Afonso and his men become the first Europeans to discover the island of São Vicente (now part of Cape Verde) off the coast of North Africa.
- February 13 – The Treaty of Westminster is agreed upon between King Edward IV of England and the Scotland noble John of Islay, Earl of Ross and Lord of the Isles. The parties sign the treaty on March 17.
- March 27 – Ivan III of Russia becomes the ruler of Russia, following the death of his father, Vasili.

=== April–June ===
- April 1 – Bishop Antony Kokkas becomes the new Ecumenical Patriarch of Constantinople, succeeding the late Patriarch Isidore II as leader of the Eastern Orthodox Christians in the Ottoman Empire. He takes the name Ioasaf I.
- April 3 – Matthias Corvinus, King of Hungary, and Frederick III, Holy Roman Emperor, come to an agreement to return the Crown of St. Stephen to Hungary in return for payment of 80,000 florins, and recognizing Matthias as King.
- April 28 – Pope Pius II issues the papal bull Cum almam nostram urbem prohibiting the destruction or removal of the ancient ruins in Rome and Campagna or the burning of ancient marble for lime, with violators subject to excommunication.
- May 23 – Catalan Civil War: In the Principality of Catalonia in Spain, the Siege of Hostalric, controlled by forces loyal to John II of Aragon, is started by Catalan General Pere de Bell-lloc and the Hostalric castle surrenders six days later.
- June 17 – In the "Night Attack at Târgoviște", Vlad the Impaler ("Dracula") attempts to assassinate Mehmed II, forcing him to retreat from Wallachia.
- June 30 – At the Battle of Seckenheim, Frederick I, as Elector of Palatine, is victorious over four other opponents.

=== July–September ===
- July 7 – In his campaign against the Ottomans in western Macedonia, at the Second Battle of Mokra, Skanderbeg surprises Ottoman troops near Mokra, orders his men to scare the enemy with drums and battlehorns, and then leads a successful attack, killing many of the Ottoman soldiers.
- July 22 – The first siege of Chilia by Stephen the Great fails, and he is seriously wounded.
- August 20 – On the Saint Bernard's Day, the Spanish army of the Kingdom of Castile, led by Enrique Pérez de Guzmán y Fonseca, captures Gibraltar, which has been under the rule of the Sultanate of Morocco for almost 130 years since its capture in 1333 AD. King Enrique IV declares himself "King of Gibraltar" in addition to his other titles.
- September 15 – The Ottoman Sultan Mehmed II conquers the Greek island of Lesbos after a 14-day attack by sea and by land with over 20,000 troops, capturing the last fortress in the siege of Mytilene.
- September 17 – Thirteen Years' War – Battle of Świecino (Battle of Żarnowiec): The Kingdom of Poland defeats the Teutonic Order.

=== October–December ===
- October 7 – Pope Pius II issues the declaration Apud Raynaldum, condemning the enslavement of Christians, although the prohibition is limited only to people recently baptized.
- October 28 – Adolph II of Nassau captures the town of Mainz and ends the Mainz Diocesan Feud, then carries a massacre of more than 400 citizens.
- November 2 – King Edward IV issues a charter guaranteeing the right of clergy to be tried in the ecclesiastical courts rather than by the royal judicial system set for most of the English inhabitants, despite the general limitation of ecclesiastical courts to church matters.
- December 22 – King Edward IV summons the members of the House of Lords and the House of Commons to assemble at the English Parliament for April 29, 1463.
- December – After Radu III the Fair takes over the throne in Wallachia, Vlad III Dracula seeks help in Transylvania, where he is captured by Mathias Corvinus, and imprisoned for the next 12 years, over false charges of treason.

=== Date unknown ===
- The Jews are expelled from Mainz, Germany.
- Portugal begins to settle the Cape Verde Islands, with slaves from the coast of Guinea.
- War of the Roses – Battle of Piltown: The Yorkists defeat the Lancastrians, in the Lordship of Ireland.

== Births ==
- January 2 – Piero di Cosimo, Italian artist (d. 1522)
- January 8 – Walraven II van Brederode, Dutch noble (d. 1531)
- February 1 – Johannes Trithemius, German scholar and cryptographer (d. 1516)
- February 21 – Joanna la Beltraneja, princess of Castile (d. 1530)
- May 19 – Baccio D'Agnolo, Italian woodcarver, sculptor and architect (d. 1543)
- May 31 – Philipp II, Count of Hanau-Lichtenberg (1489–1503) (d. 1504)
- June 27 – Louis XII, King of France (1498–1515), King of Naples (1501–1504) (d. 1515)
- July 21 – Queen Jeonghyeon, Korean royal consort (d. 1530)
- September 8 – Henry Medwall, first known English vernacular dramatist (d. 1501)
- September 16 – Pietro Pomponazzi, Italian philosopher (d. 1525)
- September 26 – Engelbert, Count of Nevers, younger son of John I (d. 1506)
- November 26 – Alexander, Count Palatine of Zweibrücken and Count of Veldenz (1489–1514) (d. 1514)
- date unknown
  - Jodocus Badius, Flemish printer (d. 1535)
- probable – Edmund Dudley, minister of Henry VII of England (d. 1510)

== Deaths ==
- February 23 – Thomas Tuddenham, English landowner (b. 1401)
- February 26 – John de Vere, 12th Earl of Oxford (b. 1408)
- February 27 – Władysław II of Płock, Polish noble (b. 1448)
- March 27 – Vasily II of Moscow, Grand Prince of Moscow (b. 1415)
- March 31 – Isidore II of Constantinople, Ecumenical Patriarch of Constantinople
- April 26 – William Percy, medieval Bishop of Carlisle (b. 1428)
- April 28 – Oldřich II of Rosenberg, Bohemian nobleman (b. 1403)
- August 26 – Catherine Zaccaria, Despotess of the Morea
- September 17 – Anna of Saxony, Landgravine of Hesse, German royalty (b. 1420)
- November 11 – Anne of Cyprus, Italian noble (b. 1418)
- November 13 – Anne of Austria, Landgravine of Thuringia, consort of William III, Landgrave of Thuringia (b. 1432)
- November 25 – John Stourton, 1st Baron Stourton, English baron (b. 1400)
- date unknown
  - King Esen Buqa II of Moghulistan
  - Niccolò Gattilusio, last Prince of Lesbos
  - Dài Jìn, Chinese painter (b. 1388)
