= Lahneck Castle =

Medieval fortress in Lahnstein, Germany

Coordinates: 50°18′23″N 7°36′45″E

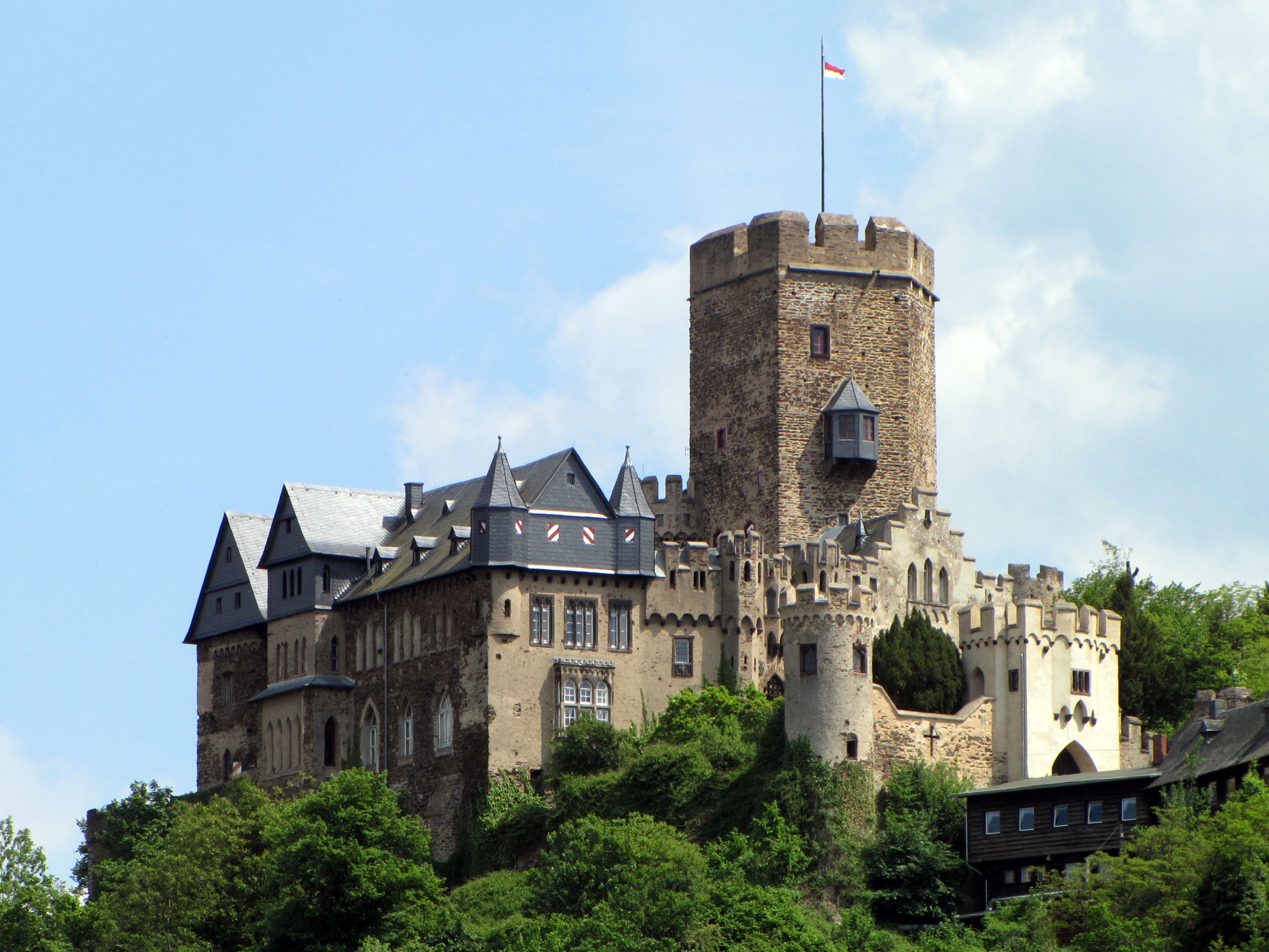
Lahneck Castle

Lahneck Castle (German: Burg Lahneck) is a medieval fortress located in the city of Lahnstein in Rhineland-Palatinate, Germany, south of Koblenz. The 13th-century castle stands on a steep rock salient above the confluence of the Lahn River with the Rhine, opposite Stolzenfels Castle, in the district of Oberlahnstein. Its symmetrical plan, an oblong rectangle, is typical of the later castles of the time of the Hohenstaufen. The pentagonal shape of the bergfried is rare for castle towers.

The castle became well known in Britain by the death of Idilia Dubb in June 1851. While on holiday with her family, the 17-year-old girl mounted the abandoned castle's high tower, when suddenly the wooden stairs collapsed behind her. Nobody heard her crying and calling from the tower, because it was surrounded by an insurmountable wall, 3 meters high. The last entry in her diary: “All I know is that there is no hope for me. My death is certain [...] 'Father in heaven, have mercy on my soul'.” She was only found years later in 1860, her diary hidden in the walls some weeks later.

== History ==
Lahneck Castle was built in 1226 by the Archbishop of Mainz Siegfried III of Eppstein to protect his territory at the mouth of the Lahn, where the town of Oberlahnstein and a silver mine had come into the possession of the Archbishopric in 1220.

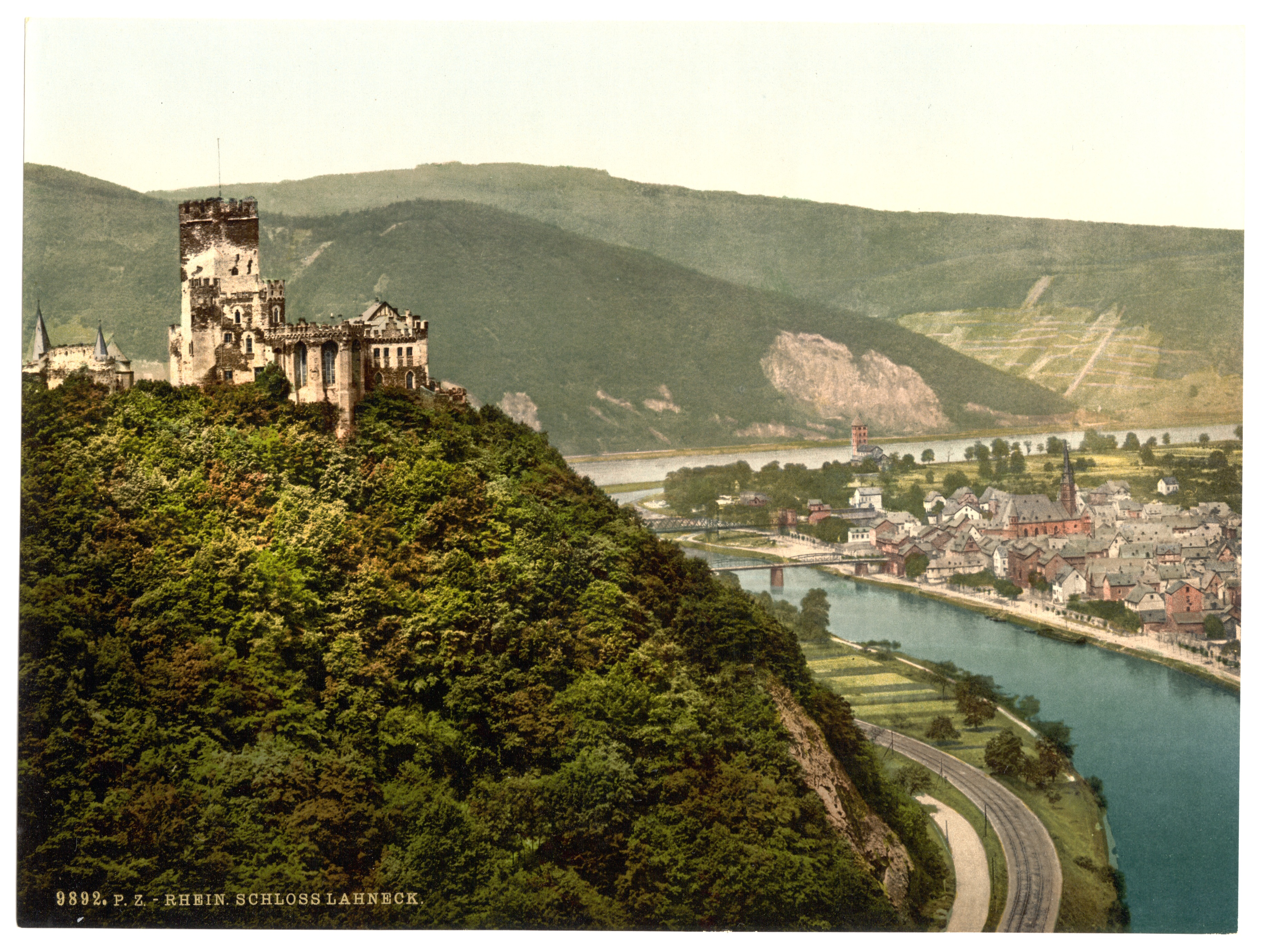
The castle in 1905, shown looming over the city of Lahnstein

The castle chapel, dedicated to Saint Ulrich of Augsburg, was built in 1245, in the same year the first burgrave took up residence in the castle.

In 1298, King Adolf of Nassau was a guest at the castle, shortly before his death in the Battle of Göllheim against King Albert I of Habsburg. In order to avenge him, the Burgrave of Lahneck, Friedrich Schilling of Lahnstein, participated in a conspiracy against Albert. The castle was stormed in 1309 and Friedrich Schilling was executed.

According to legend, when the Knights Templar were ordered by Pope Clement V to disband in 1312, the last 12 Templars took refuge in the castle, where they perished in a heroic fight to the death with forces of Mainz Archbishop Peter of Aspelt.

In 1332, Pope John XXII granted a 40-day indulgence to those attending services in the castle chapel.

On 4 June 1400, King Wenceslaus of Germany was deposed by the four Rhenish prince-electors in Oberlahnstein. Together with the Prince Elector of Mainz, Burgrave Frederick of Nuremberg hosted many of the delegates sent by the cities at the castle. In Athens, the following day, Rupert, Count Palatine of the Rhine, was elected the new "King of the Romans".

In 1475, the Archbishop of Mainz, Theodoric of Isenburg-Büdingen, had the castle strengthened with two outer walls following the Mainz Bishops Feud with his rival archbishop, Adolph II of Nassau.

In 1633, during the Thirty Years War, the castle was heavily damaged by Swedish and Imperial troops.

On 18 July 1774 Johann Wolfgang von Goethe wrote the poem Geistesgruß. It was inspired by the sight of Lahneck Castle during his travels along the river Lahn.

In the German Mediatisation of 1803, in which the Archbishopric of Mainz lost its secular territories, Lahneck Castle was granted to the Duchy of Nassau. In 1850 it was sold and has remained in private ownership since. Edward Moriarty, a Director of the Rhenish Railway Company, became one of its first owners. During the ownership of Earl Kleist-Tychow, a more than life-sized portrait of Queen Victoria was presented which can still be seen at the castle. Imperial Admiral Robert Mischke, later commander of the battlecruiser SMS Von der Tann, purchased the castle in 1907 and it has been owned by his family ever since.

== Literary references ==
In Fisher's Drawing Room Scrap Book (1838) is Letitia Elizabeth Landon's poetical illustration to an engraving of a painting by Samuel Prout entitled The Church of St. John, and the Ruins of Lahneck Castle.

The castle features in chapter 14 of Unless Victory Comes, Gene Garrison's memoir of the United States 3rd Army's crossing of the Rhine on the morning of 25 March 1945.
