= Bavarian War =

Bavarian War may refer to:

- Bavarian War (1420–1422), a conflict between Louis VII of Bavaria-Ingolstadt and Henry XVI of Bavaria-Landshut
- Bavarian War (1459–1463), a conflict between Albert Achilles of Brandenburg and Louis IX of Bavaria-Landshut
- Landshut War of Succession, (1503-1505), a conflict between Albert IV of Bavaria-Munich and George of Bavaria-Landshut
- War of the Bavarian Succession (1778–1779), a conflict between the Habsburg Monarchy and a Saxon–Prussian alliance
