= Patriarch Joasaph of Constantinople =

Patriarch Joasaph of Constantinople may refer to:

- Joasaph I of Constantinople, Ecumenical Patriarch in the 1460s
- Joasaph II of Constantinople, "the Magnificent", Ecumenical Patriarch in 1556–1565
