= Battle of Seckenheim =

Battle during the Mainz Feud, part of the larger Bavarian War

Coordinates: 49°29′20″N 8°28′9″E

- Part of Bavarian War (1459–63)
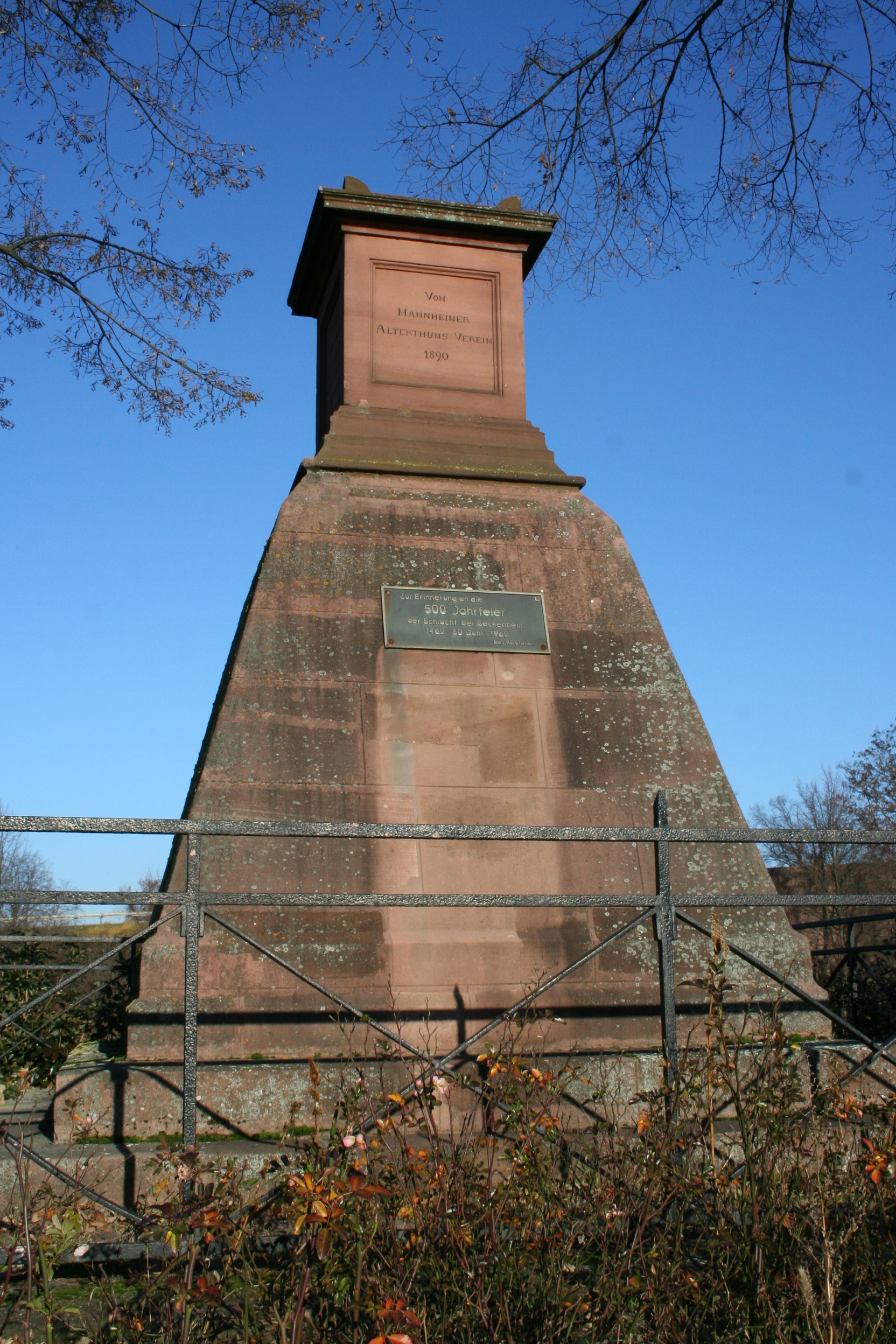
- Memorial to Battle of Seckenheim, 30 June 1462
Date	30 June 1462
Location	Mannheim, Germany
Result	Palatine victory

Belligerents
Electoral Palatinate; Electorate of Mainz	Margraviate of Baden; County of Württemberg; Palatinate-Zweibrücken; Bishopric of Metz

Commanders and leaders
Frederick of Palatine; Dieter von Isenburg	Charles I (POW); Count Ulrich (POW); Count Louis I Palatine; Bishop George (POW)

Strength
3,100+	6,000–8,000

Casualties and losses
12 knights killed many grooms killed	40+ knights killed 327 captured

The Battle of Seckenheim (June 1462) saw the army of the Electoral Palatinate led by Frederick I, Elector Palatine and his ally Dieter von Isenburg face an invading army led by Charles I, Margrave of Baden-Baden, Ulrich V, Count of Württemberg, Louis I, Count Palatine of Zweibrücken, and George of Baden, the Bishop of Metz. Without warning, Frederick suddenly struck at the invaders, trapping them in the fork of two major rivers. Though about 300 knights cut their way out, causing many non-combatant casualties, the Palatine forces were victorious. Frederick captured three of the enemy leaders and wrung ransoms and territorial concessions from them. Seckenheim is now part of the city of Mannheim in the state of Baden-Württemberg, Germany. The combat occurred during the Mainz Feud (Mainzer Stiftsfehde), part of the larger Bavarian War (1459–63).

== Background ==
On 4 July 1460, Frederick I, Elector Palatine defeated Dieter von Isenburg in the Battle of Pfeddersheim. But in the fall of 1461, Pope Pius II replaced Dieter as archbishop of Mainz with Adolph II of Nassau. In his desire to reclaim his former position, Dieter sought Frederick's assistance and handed over substantial territories to the Palatinate as payment. Irritated by this defiance, the pope excommunicated both Dieter and Frederick in early 1462. At the same time, the pope's ally Frederick III, Holy Roman Emperor declared war on the two. Ulrich V, Count of Württemberg, Louis I, Count Palatine of Zweibrücken, Charles I, Margrave of Baden-Baden and his brother George of Baden, Bishop of Metz formed a coalition against Frederick and in favor of Adolph II.

In June 1462, the army of the anti-Frederick alliance invaded the Electoral Palatinate with a force between 6,000 and 8,000 soldiers; they pillaged and burned property extensively. Their sources said that Frederick was not in his capital at Heidelberg, so the allied princes directed their army toward that place. Frederick was indeed at Heidelberg and he may have had spread reports to his absence in order to fool his enemies. Frederick rapidly massed 800 men-at-arms and 2,000 foot soldiers including Swiss mercenaries. Dieter arrived at the muster with 300 men-at-arms. In addition, many peasants also joined Frederick's army.

== Battle ==
On 30 June 1462, Frederick sallied out of Heidelberg and caught a significant part of the allied host near Seckenheim, 12 miles (19 km) away from their fortified camp. The allies were trapped in the wedge between the Rhine and Neckar Rivers. Backed up against the rivers, the allied army prepared for battle. For recognition, they wore a badge of oat straws while the Palatine warriors wore hazel leaves on their helmets. Frederick marshaled his army in an echelon formation with his vanguard and men-at-arms in the center. On either side of the central mass was a double line of mounted crossbowmen. Frederick kept his infantry out of sight in a nearby forest.

After some skirmishing, the heavy cavalry of both armies charged into each other. Frederick's men-at-arms barely prevented the allied horsemen from smashing through. As the cavalrymen hacked away at each other, Frederick's infantry emerged from its hiding place and closed around the allies. A body of 300 allied horsemen cut their way out and then fell upon the Palatine grooms as they waited on their men-at-arms. The hapless grooms were slaughtered, but the Palatine army won a decisive victory, killing over 40 knights for a loss of about 12 knights killed. Frederick's army gathered up 124 noblemen and 204 squires as prisoners. Among the captured were three enemy leaders, Charles of Baden-Baden, Ulrich of Württemberg, and Bishop George of Metz. Only Louis of Zweibrücken avoided being made a prisoner. By the following year the princes had been ransomed for large sums and significant territories.
