= Patriarch Sophronius of Constantinople =

Patriarch Sophronius of Constantinople may refer to:

- Sophronius I of Constantinople, ruled in 1463–1464
- Sophronius II of Constantinople, Ecumenical Patriarch in 1775–1780
- Sophronius III of Constantinople, ruled in 1863–1866
