= Free City of Mainz =

German Middle age city-state (1244-1462)

Free City of Mainz Freie Stadt Mainz
- 1244–1462
- Status: Free imperial city
- Capital: Mainz
- Historical era: Middle Ages
  - City charter granted by Siegfried III: 1244
  - Rival archbishops: 1461
  - Charter revoked by Adolph II: 1462
Preceded by	Succeeded by
Archbishopric of Mainz	Archbishopric of Mainz

The Free City of Mainz was a city-state in the Holy Roman Empire that existed from 1244 to 1462 in the late Middle Ages, which played a crucial role in the Christianization of the Germanic and Slavic communities during the Middle Ages.

The first archbishop of Mainz, Boniface, was assassinated in 754 while attempting to convert the Frisians to Christianity, and his remains are interred in Fulda. Mainz became a regular archbishopric in 781, when Boniface's successor, Lullus, was granted the pallium by Pope Adrian I. Harald Klak, king of Jutland, and his followers were baptized at Mainz in 826, in the abbey of St. Alban's. Rabanus Maurus, a scholar and writer, and Willigis, who initiated the construction of the current building of the Mainz Cathedral and established the Monastery of St. Stephan, were among the early archbishops of Mainz.

From Willigis until the dissolution of the Holy Roman Empire in 1806, the Archbishops of Mainz served as the archchancellors of the Empire and were the highest-ranking of the seven Electors of the Holy Roman Emperor. The Roman Catholic Diocese of Mainz is the only diocese in the world with an episcopal see known as a Holy See, in addition to Rome. The Archbishops of Mainz were traditionally primas germaniae. In 1244, Archbishop Siegfried III granted Mainz a city charter, which gave the citizens the right to establish and elect a city council.

In 1461, a conflict erupted between two archbishops: Diether von Isenburg, who had been elected Archbishop by the cathedral chapter and was backed by the citizens, and Adolf II von Nassau, who had been named archbishop of Mainz by the pope.

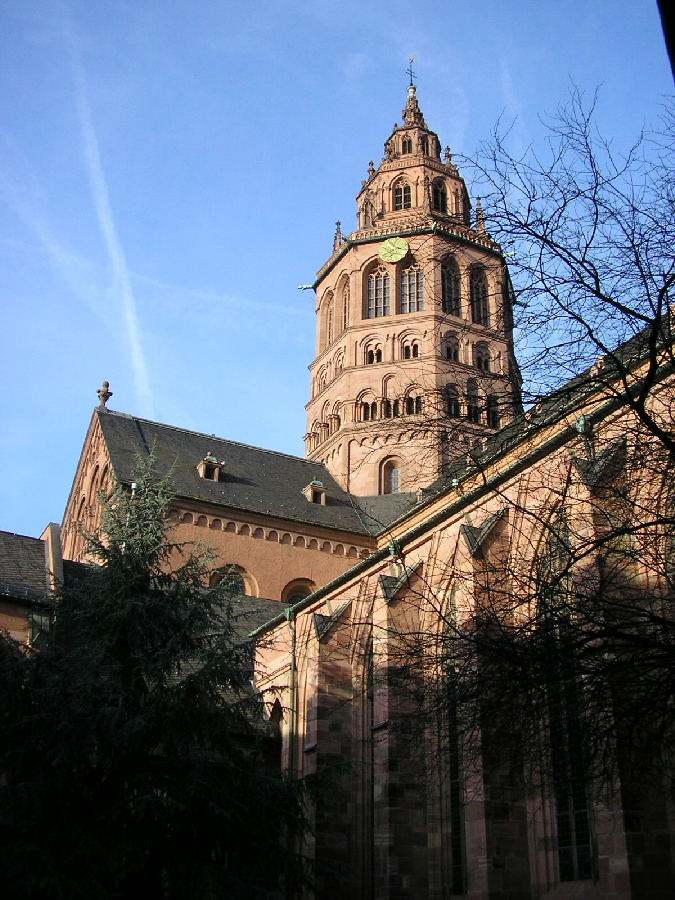
Mainz Cathedral, western main tower

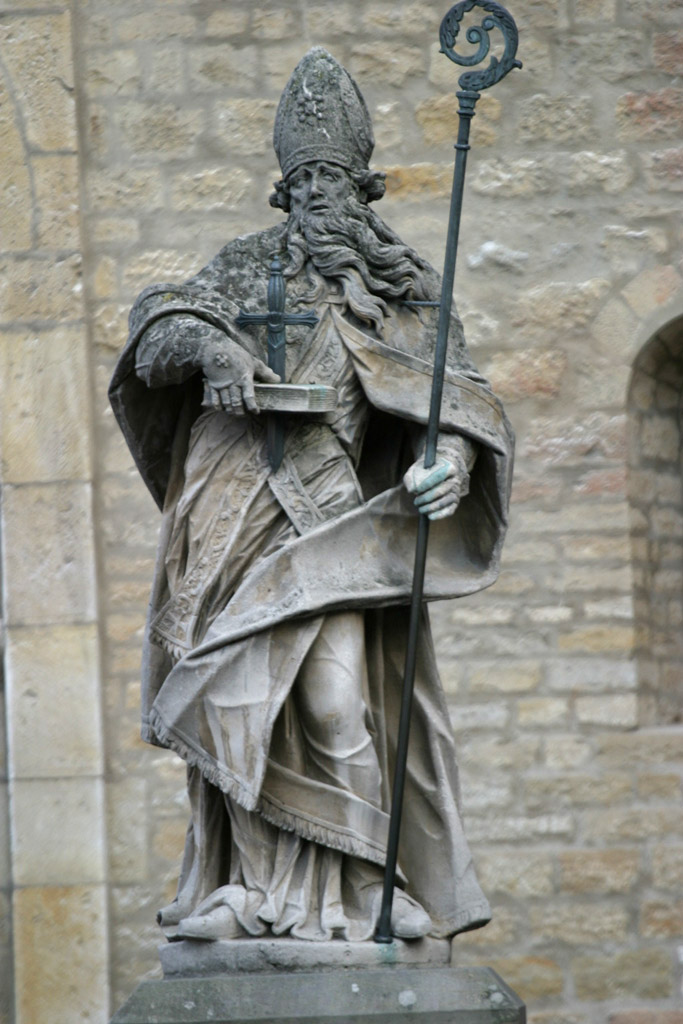
Monument to St. Boniface before Mainz Cathedral

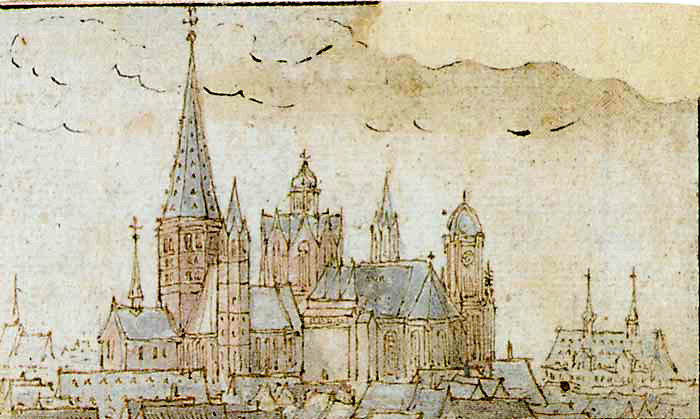
St. Martin's Cathedral in Mainz, by Wenzel Hollar; pen-and-ink drawing 1632

== See also ==
- Electorate of Mainz
- Mainz
