= Patriarch Isidore of Constantinople =

Patriarch Isidore of Constantinople may refer to:

- Isidore I of Constantinople, Ecumenical Patriarch in 1347–1350
- Isidore II of Constantinople, Ecumenical Patriarch in 1456–1462
