= Sophronius I of Constantinople =

Ecumenical Patriarch of Constantinople from 1463 to 1464

- Ecumenical Patriarch of Constantinople
- Church: Church of Constantinople
- In office: June 1463 – August 1464
- Predecessor: Gennadius II of Constantinople
- Successor: Gennadius II of Constantinople

Personal details
- Died: After 1464
- Denomination: Eastern Orthodoxy

Sophronius I of Constantinople (Greek: Σωφρόνιος; died after 1464) was Ecumenical Patriarch of Constantinople from June 1463 to August 1464. The dates of his reign are disputed by scholars in a range from 1462 to 1464.

== Life ==
Almost nothing is known about the life and the patriarchate of Sophronius I. It is known an act with his name dated August 1464 which certified a cross belonged to Emperor David of Trebizond, the document is probably a forgery, but it confirms us that Sophronius I was actually the patriarch. According to Blanchet, who places the reign of Sophronius after Joasaph I's, he was Metropolitan of Heraclea before being elected patriarch.

One primary source designates Sophronius I with the name Syropoulos. Thus it was conjectured, but not proven, that Sophronius was indeed Sylvester Syropoulos, the Orthodox cleric who participated at the Council of Florence and who wrote a chronicle of it. Sylvester Syropoulos belonged to the faction which was in favor of the East-West Union of Churches, and he signed the documents of the council. This fact works against the possible identification of Sophronius with Sylvester Syropoulos; if however he is indeed the same person, it could justify the virtual damnatio memoriae displayed in the primary sources against him.

== Disputed chronology ==
The chronology of the reign of Sophronius I is disputed among scholars. Recent scholarship, such as Kiminas (2009), Podskalsky (1988), Laurent (1968) and Runciman (1985), places the reign of Sophronius I after Joasaph I of Constantinople, dating it between June 1463 and August 1464.

Other scholars, following Bishop Gemanos of Sardeis (1933–1938) and Grumel (1958), as well as the official website of the Ecumenical Patriarchate, propose that Sophronius I reigned before Joasaph I of Constantinople, however the dates they provide differ only by a few months from the ones mentioned above due to a different suggested length of the second term of Gennadius II of Constantinople. Blanchet (2001) places Sophronius I's reign from 1 April 1462 to summer 1464, directly after Isidore II of Constantinople and immediately before Joasaph I.

Furthermore, there is no consensus among scholars on the length and chronology of the second and third terms of Gennadius II, which supposedly alternated the patriarchates of Joasaph I and Sophronius I. For a comparison of the main scholar suggestions, see the List of Patriarchs of Constantinople.

== Bibliography ==
- Kiminas, Demetrius (2009). The Ecumenical Patriarchate - A History of Its Metropolitanates with Annotated Hierarch Catalogs. Wildside Press. ISBN 9781434458766.
- Laurent, Vitalien (1968). "Les premiers patriarches de Constantinople sous la domination turque (1454–1476) - Succession et chronologie d'après un catalogue inédit". Revue des études byzantines. 26: 229–263. doi:10.3406/rebyz.1968.1407.
- Runciman, Steven (1985) [1968]. The Great Church in Captivity - A Study of the Patriarchate of Constantinople from the Eve of the Turkish Conquest to the Greek War of Independence (2nd ed.). Cambridge University Press. ISBN 9780521313100.

Eastern Orthodox Church titles
Preceded by Gennadius II	Ecumenical Patriarch of Constantinople; 1463 – 1464	Succeeded by Gennadius II
