= The Diary of Miss Idilia =

2002 book

The diary of Miss Idilia
- The front cover
- Author: Idilia Dubb
- Original title: Das verschwundene Mädchen : die Aufzeichnungen der Idilia Dubb
- Publisher: Bertelsmann, Short
- Publication date: 2002
- English publication date: 2010
- ISBN: 1906021813

The Diary of Miss Idilia: A Tragic Tale of Young Love Lost is a book edited by Genevieve Hill. It presents itself to be the original diary of a young girl who disappeared whilst on holiday with her parents in the German Rhineland in 1851.

First published under the title Das verschwundene Mädchen : die Aufzeichnungen der Idilia Dubb (The missing girl: the records of Idilia Dubb) by Bertelsmann in Munich in 2002, the diary was later translated into Dutch by Mistral in 2009, and published in English by Short Books in 2010.

The authenticity of the diary and the historicity of the events described in it have been challenged.

== Synopsis ==
Idilia Dubb is a 17-year-old Scottish girl who disappears during a holiday, while on a family trip to Germany in 1851. After a lengthy search fails to find her, her parents return home. In 1860, workmen at Lahneck Castle discover her remains at the top of a tower. Lying next to her skeleton is a diary in which she has recorded the horrors of her final days, after a wooden staircase collapses, leaving her trapped at the top of the tower without food or water.

== Authenticity ==
Questions have been raised about the authenticity of the diary. English publishers Short Books published the diary as non-fiction, but stated that its ‘authenticity can never be entirely verified’.

In a review of the English edition for The Spectator, Andrew Taylor wrote 'even the most credulous reader wouldn't get too far here without smelling several large rats', citing the use of foreshadowing devices, anachronistic language, and the action-packed narrative.

German historians have pointed out that there are many historical mistakes in the book. For example, a nearby church is described having two towers, but one of them had already collapsed in 1844; Dubb mentions hearing the noise of a train, although the railroad through the Rhine-Valley was not built until 1859.

== Bibliography ==
- Eddy, Beverly D., Abbeys, Ghosts, and Castles – A Guide to the Folk History of the Middle Rhine. Carlton Press, Inc. ISBN 0-8062-1205-5.
