= Mainz Diocesan Feud =

War in 1461-1462

The Mainz Diocesan Feud (German: Mainzer Erzstiftsfehde), also known as the Baden-Palatine War (Badisch-Pfälzischer Krieg), took place in 1461–1462 and was a small-scale war for the throne of the Electorate of Mainz.

== Background ==
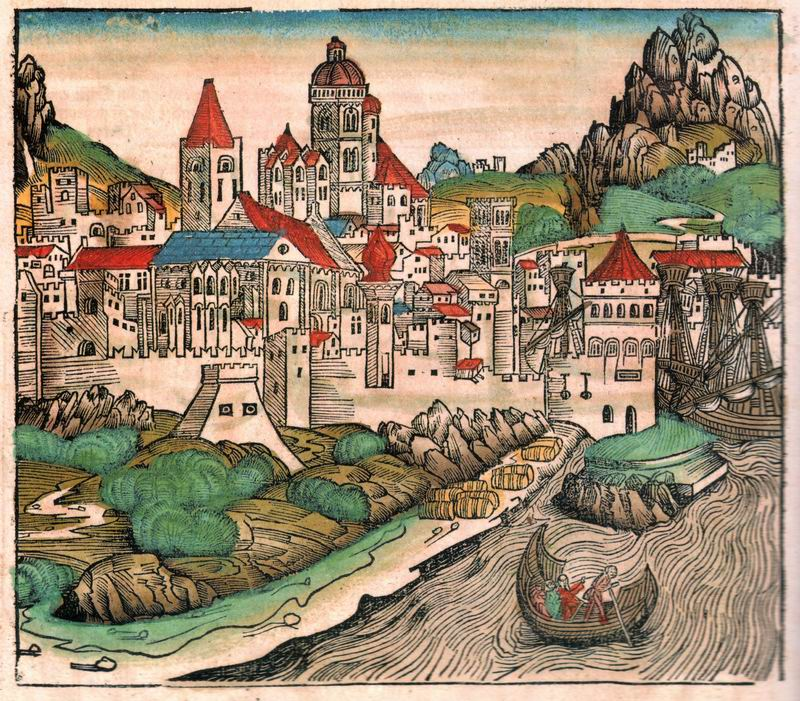
Mainz at the end of the 15th century

In 1459 the Domkustos, Diether of Isenburg, was elected with a small majority, beating Adolph of Nassau to become the new Archbishop of Mainz. Diether immediately had to join the so-called anti-Palatinate alliance which had fallen into a dispute in 1458 with the Count Palatine, Frederick I. Diether forged an alliance and marched to war against the Count Palatine, but lost the decisive battle of Pfeddersheim in July 1460.

Because Diether was able to achieve his papal confirmation only with some difficulty and by paying a large amount of money (Servitiengeld, 20,000 guilders), he opposed the political, legal, and financial demands of both Emperor and Pope. Pope Pius II thus sought his replacement by Adolph of Nassau who had been defeated in the 1459 election. He banished Diether on 21 August 1461 and declared him deposed, citing Diether's oppositional attitude towards the Church and Emperor Frederick III, Diether's reform efforts, and his demands for abolition of papal annates. Adolph of Nassau was appointed by the Pope as the new Archbishop of Mainz and enthroned on 1 October 1461. The city of Mainz, however, continued to support Diether, who refused to vacate the archbishop's throne.

== Course ==
Adolph allied himself with the Archbishop of Trier, John II of Baden; the Bishop of Metz, George of Baden; the Bishop of Speyer, Johann II Nix of Hoheneck; and Count Ulrich V of Württemberg. Margrave Charles I of Baden at first tried to mediate between the warring factions, then took the side of his brother, Bishop George of Metz, who was in Adolph's camp, thus precipitating the Baden-Palatinate war, an attempt to seize the disputed bishopric by force.

On Diether's side were the city council of Mainz, his brother Louis, and Prince-Elector Frederick I of the Palatinate, originally an enemy of Diether's. For his assistance, Frederick was given the towns of Lorsch, Heppenheim, and Bensheim.

Initially the Baden troops devastated the Palatine estates left of the Rhine, then advanced alongside those from Speyer and Württemberg up the eastern side of the Rhine and rampaged through the Palatine lands there too.

In summer 1462, those on the side of the alliance under Adolph of Nassau believed rumours that Count Palatine Frederick and his troops were holding on in Bavaria in order to stand by the Duke in a feud against the Margrave of Ansbach. Under the assumption that the Palatinate was therefore undefended, Baden and Württemberg troops marched from Bretten with 8,000 men and invaded the state. They advanced, burning and plundering, from Speyer over the Rhine to Seckenheim. Because Frederick I had, however, not stayed in Bavaria, Adolph's forces were surprised and heavily defeated in the forest near Seckenheim by Frederick I and the counts of Leiningen and Katzenelnbogen, because the mounted vanguard of the alliance had felt so unthreatened that they had strayed too far ahead of their foot soldiers. Margrave Charles I and his brother, Bishop George of Metz, were wounded and taken prisoner. With the capture of Count Ulrich V of Württemberg soon afterwards by Hans von Gemmingen this phase of the war came to an end. His victory in the Battle of Seckenheim earned Frederick the nickname "the Victorious" (der Siegreiche). The name of the settlement of Friedrichsfeld ("Frederick's field"), built on the site and now a district of Mannheim, commemorates that event.

Frederick I had the prisoners taken to his castle at Heidelberg and put in chains until the ransoms demanded by him were paid. Margrave Charles had to pay 25,000 guilders, hand over Sponheim as a pledge and agree Pforzheim as a fief of the Electorate of the Palatinate. The Bishop of Metz had to pay 45,000 guilders for his release. Most importantly for Frederick, though, the victory had sealed the long-term security of his position as prince-elector.

But the diocesan feud did not end there. Further battles cost many lives and resulted in the devastation of all the settlements, and the town of Mainz itself suffered severe damage. In the night of 28 October 1462, as a result of the betrayal of some of Mainz's citizens, Adolph of Nassau broke into the town through the gate called the Gautor with 500 men and, after 12 hours of street fighting took possession of the town. 400 men lost their lives and Adolph's people plundered and sacked parts of the town including the former Dominican monastery. As a punishment for its support of Diether, Adolph removed the town's privileges of freedom and thus its status as a free town; the town came under the rule of a vicedominus appointed by the Archbishop. The following day the citizens were summoned to the Dietmarkt market place. All 800 citizens who appeared were driven out of the town; about 400 of them were released again some time later and allowed to remain in Mainz.

== Conclusion ==
The diocesan feud itself ended only after several attempts at mediation in October 1463. Diether of Isenburg stood down and recognised Adolph as his successor in the Treaty of Zeilsheim. He himself was paid off with a considerable sum of money and a small principality, created from the Mainz estate, consisting of the towns of Höchst, Steinheim, and Dieburg.

The alliances of both contenders for the archbishop's throne had been bought at considerable cost to both their personal and the archiepiscopal estate. A number of castles and towns were transferred to the Palatinate, Hesse and, briefly, even Saxony. The settlement of that debt remained a dominant issue in the Archbishopric in the coming years.

After the death of Adolph in 1475, Diether of Isenburg was once more elected as archbishop by the Mainz cathedral chapter and confirmed by Pope Sixtus IV. Diether reigned without further conflict until his death in 1482.

== See also ==
- Diether von Isenburg
- Adolph II of Nassau
- Bavarian War (1459–63)

== Literature ==
- Friedrich Wilhelm Bautz (1975). "Dietherr Graf von Isenburg". In Bautz, Friedrich Wilhelm (ed.). Biographisch-Bibliographisches Kirchenlexikon (BBKL) (in German). Vol. 1. Hamm: Bautz. cols. 1297–1298. ISBN 3-88309-013-1.
- Karl Menzel: Die Verträge zwischen den Grafen Adolf von Nassau und Diether von Isenburg-Büdingen zur Beilegung des Streits um das Erzstift Mainz. In Annalen des Vereins für Nassauische Altertumskunde und Geschichtsforschung. Vol. 10, 1870, pp. 1–41, digitalised.
- Konrad Repgen: Antimanifest und Kriegsmanifest. Die Benutzung der neuen Drucktechnik bei der Mainzer Stiftsfehde 1461/63 durch die Erzbischöfe Adolf von Nassau und Diether von Isenburg. In: Johannes Helmrath, Heribert Müller (eds.): Studien zum 15. Jahrhundert. Festschrift für Erich Meuthen. Vol. 2. Oldenbourg, Munich, 1994, ISBN 3-486-56078-6, pp. 781–803.
- Kai-Michael Sprenger: Die Mainzer Stiftsfehde 1459–1463. In Franz Dumont, Ferdinand Scherf, Friedrich Schütz (eds.): Mainz. Die Geschichte der Stadt. 2nd edition by Zabern, Mainz, 1999, ISBN 3-8053-2000-0, pp. 205–227.
- Aloys Schmidt: Zur Mainzer Stiftsfehde 1462. In Jahrbuch für das Bistum Mainz. Vol. 3, 1948, ISSN 0720-2113, pp. 89–99.
