= Gennadius Scholarius =

Byzantine Greek theologian (c. 1400–c. 1472)

Saint Gennadius II of Constantinople
- Ecumenical Patriarch of Constantinople
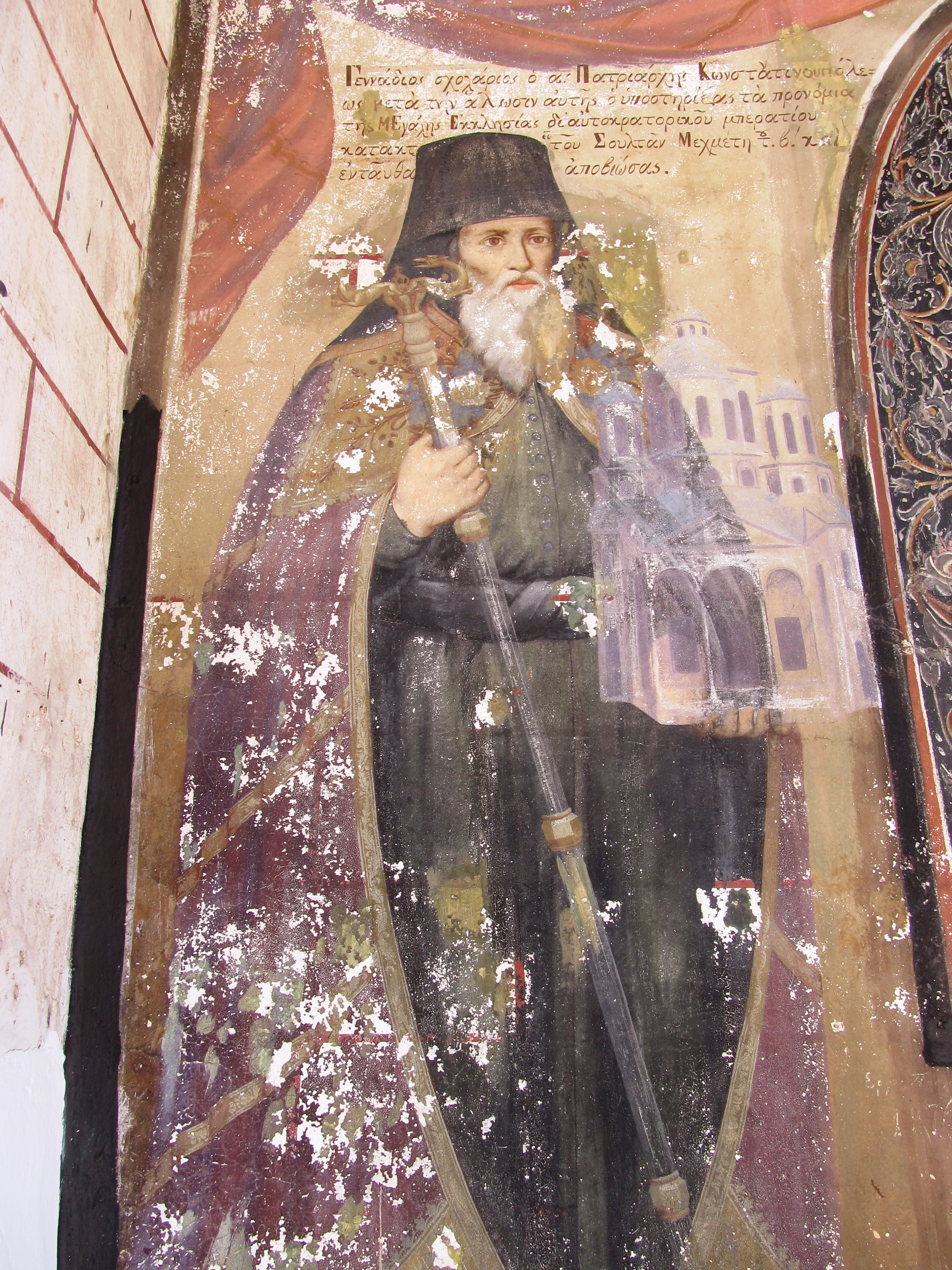
- Gennadius II of Constantinople on a wall fresco in a monastery in Serres
- Church: Church of Constantinople
- In office: 6 January 1454 – 6 January 1456; April 1463 – June 1463; Autumn 1464 – autumn 1465
- Predecessor: Athanasius II of Constantinople; Joasaph I of Constantinople; Sophronius I of Constantinople
- Successor: Isidore II of Constantinople; Sophronius I of Constantinople; Mark II of Constantinople

Personal details
- Born: Georgios Kourtesios c. 1400 Constantinople
- Died: c. 1472 Saint John Prodromos Monastery near Siroz, Rumelia Eyalet, Ottoman Empire

Sainthood
- Feast day: 31st August and 25th August (according to the tradition of the Monastery of Saint John Prodromos)
- Venerated in: Eastern Orthodox Church

Gennadius II of Constantinople (Greek: Γεννάδιος; lay name: Γεώργιος Κουρτέσιος Σχολάριος, Georgios Kourtesios; c. 1400 – c. 1472) was a Byzantine philosopher and theologian, and Ecumenical Patriarch of Constantinople from 1454 to 1465. He was a strong advocate for the use of Aristotelian philosophy in the Orthodox Church. Following the Fall of Constantinople, Gennadius II was appointed Patriarch of Constantinople by the Ottoman Sultan. His opposition to the Union with the Catholic Church contributed to his selection, as it corresponded with the Ottoman interest in preserving the division between the Orthodox and Catholic Churches. During his tenure, Gennadius remained loyal to the Sultan and opposed initiatives aimed at reconciliation with Rome.

Gennadius II was, together with his mentor, Mark of Ephesus, involved in the Council of Florence which aimed to end the schism between the Orthodox and Catholic churches. Gennadius II had studied and written extensively on Catholic theology. After the failure of the union of Florence and the Fall of Constantinople, Gennadius II became the first Ecumenical Patriarch of Constantinople under Ottoman rule. Just before the fall of Constantinople, and after Cardinal Isidore of Kiev had celebrated a Latin Mass in Hagia Sophia to celebrate the ratification of the Council of Florence, its citizens consulted Gennadius II. Gibbon has him say: "O miserable Romans, why will ye abandon the truth? and why, instead of confiding in God, will ye put your trust in the Italians? In losing your faith you will lose your city. Have mercy on me, O Lord! I protest in thy presence that I am innocent of the crime. O miserable Romans, consider, pause, and repent. At the same moment that you renounce the religion of your fathers, by embracing impiety, you submit to a foreign servitude".

A polemicist, Gennadius II left in writing several treatises on the differences between Catholic and Orthodox theology, the Filioque, a defence of Aristotelianism and excerpts from an exposition (entitled Confession) of the Eastern Orthodox faith addressed to Mehmed II.

== Biography ==
He was born Georgios Kourtesios in Constantinople c. 1400 and he belonged to an ethnic Greek family originally from the island of Chios; the name Scholarios (which was also a title) is thought to derive from a family member's position in the Byzantine Navy or the imperial palace. His abecedary was Mark of Ephesus (d. 1444). Following his tutelage under the famous John Chortasmenos ("didaskalos" of the Patriarchal School), Manuel-Mark might have then recommended him to study under his own previous master, Gemistos Plethon (d. 1452–1454), c. 1428. However, his studies under Plethon are a matter of speculation and, at any rate, would have been more likely attendance at Plethon's lectures at Mystras. Gennadius had been a teacher of philosophy before entering the service of the emperor John VIII Palaiologos as a theological advisor. In fact, in 1437 – in anticipation of the Council of Florence – the emperor formally studied Neilos Kabasilas's works along with Mark of Ephesus and Gennadius II. Curiously, the trio also formally studied the works of Duns Scotus (d. 1308) because of his rejection of the Filioque in Thomistic metaphysics, as well as Scotus' doctrine of a "formal distinction" between the persons and essence of God, as well as God's attributes (or "energies"). It was for this reason that Gennadius II wrote an academic refutation of the first eighteen of Mark of Ephesus' "Syllogistic Chapters against the Latins". From this, the Catholic Encyclopedia speculates that Gennadius II was likely writing an academic exercise to inform his former master that Thomas Aquinas' opinions did not constitute a universally Latin approach to questions on the Trinity.

=== Council of Florence ===
Gennadius became historically important when, as judge in the civil courts under John VIII Palaiologos (1425–1448), he accompanied his emperor to the Council of Florence, held in 1438–1439 in Ferrara and Florence. The object of this endeavor was bringing a union between the Greek and Latin Churches, which he supported at that time. He made four speeches at the council – all exceedingly conciliatory.

At the same council appeared the celebrated Platonist, Gemistos Plethon, the most powerful opponent of the then dominant Aristotelianism, and consequently an antagonist of Gennadius. In church matters, as in philosophy, the two were opposed – Plethon advocated a partial return to Greek paganism in the form of a syncretic union between Christianity and Zoroastrianism; while Gennadius, more cautious, pressed the necessity for ecclesiastical union with Rome on doctrinal grounds, and was instrumental in drawing up a form which from its vagueness and ambiguity might be accepted by both parties. Gennadius was at a serious disadvantage because, being a layman, he could not directly take part in the discussions of the council.

=== Return to Constantinople ===
Despite his initial advocacy of the union (and berating many of the Orthodox bishops for their lack of theological learnedness), Gennadius soured on union during the council and left it early in June 1440. At the behest of his mentor Mark of Ephesus, who converted him completely to anti-Latin Orthodoxy, until his death, Gennadius was known (with Mark of Ephesus) as the most uncompromising enemy of the union. It was at just about this time (1444) that he began to draw attention to the putative heterodoxy of Aquinas' "distinction of reason" between the attributes (viz., energies) and essence of God. First, as contained in Martin Jugie's edition of his opera omnia, Gennadius interrupts chapters 94–96 of his discourse "On Being and Essence" of Thomas Aquinas and replaces the Thomistic explanation with that of Scotism in order to agree better with Gregory Palamas. However, he initially mitigates total condemnation of Aquinas, noting that later Scholastics (like Hervaeus Natalis) interpret Aquinas in a more Orthodox light. This point marks Gennadius' increasing theological distance from Aquinas, where he begins to be more theologically condemnatory of him in later works (e.g., his treatises on the Holy Spirit and his Preface to the Greek "Summa Theologiae"). However, this distance can be overstated. Marcus Plested observes that Gennadius' "love and esteem for Thomas was to continue undimmed throughout his career although he would often accentuate the note of caution in later works". Despite his cautions, Gennadius writes of Thomas "We love this divinely-inspired and wise man". He wrote many works to defend his new convictions, which differ so much from the earlier conciliatory ones that Leo Allatius thought there must be two people of the same name; to whom Edward Gibbon: "Eusèbe Renaudot has restored the identity of his person, and the duplicity of his character".

After the death of John VIII in 1448, Gennadius entered the Pantokrator monastery in Constantinople under Emperor Constantine XI Palaiologos (1448–1453) and took, according to the invariable custom, a new name: Gennadius. Before the fall of the city he was already well known as a bitter opponent of the union. He and Mark of Ephesus were the leaders of the anti-Latin party. In 1444, Mark of Ephesus on his deathbed praised Gennadius's irreconcilable attitude towards the Latins and the union. It was to Gennadius that the angry people went after seeing the Uniate services in the great church of Hagia Sophia. It is said that he hid himself, but left a notice on the door of his cell: "O unhappy Romans, why have you forsaken the truth? Why do you not trust in God, instead of in the Italians? In losing your faith you will lose your city".

=== Ottoman period ===
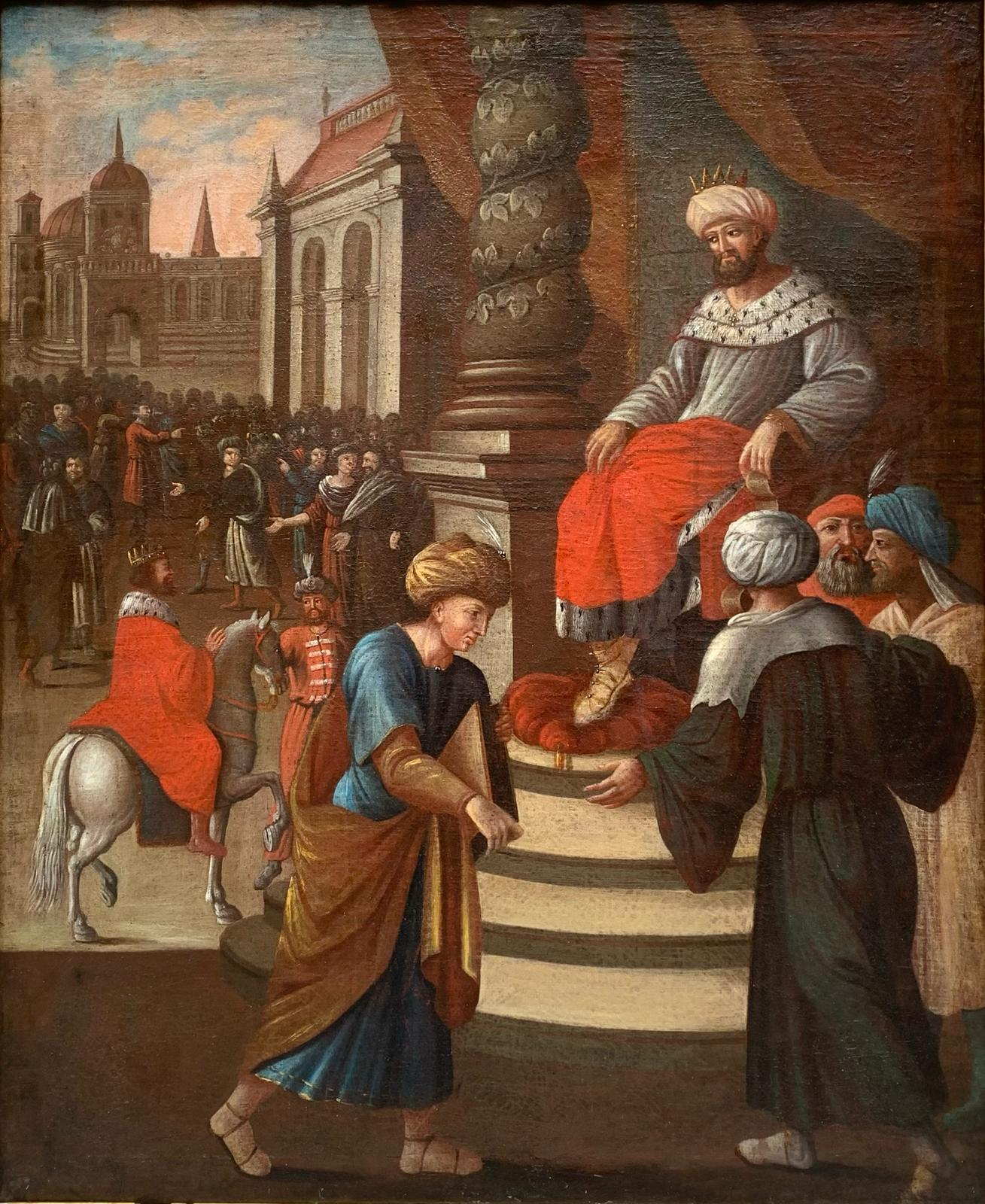
Patriarch Gennadius II with Mehmet II depicted on an 18th-century painting

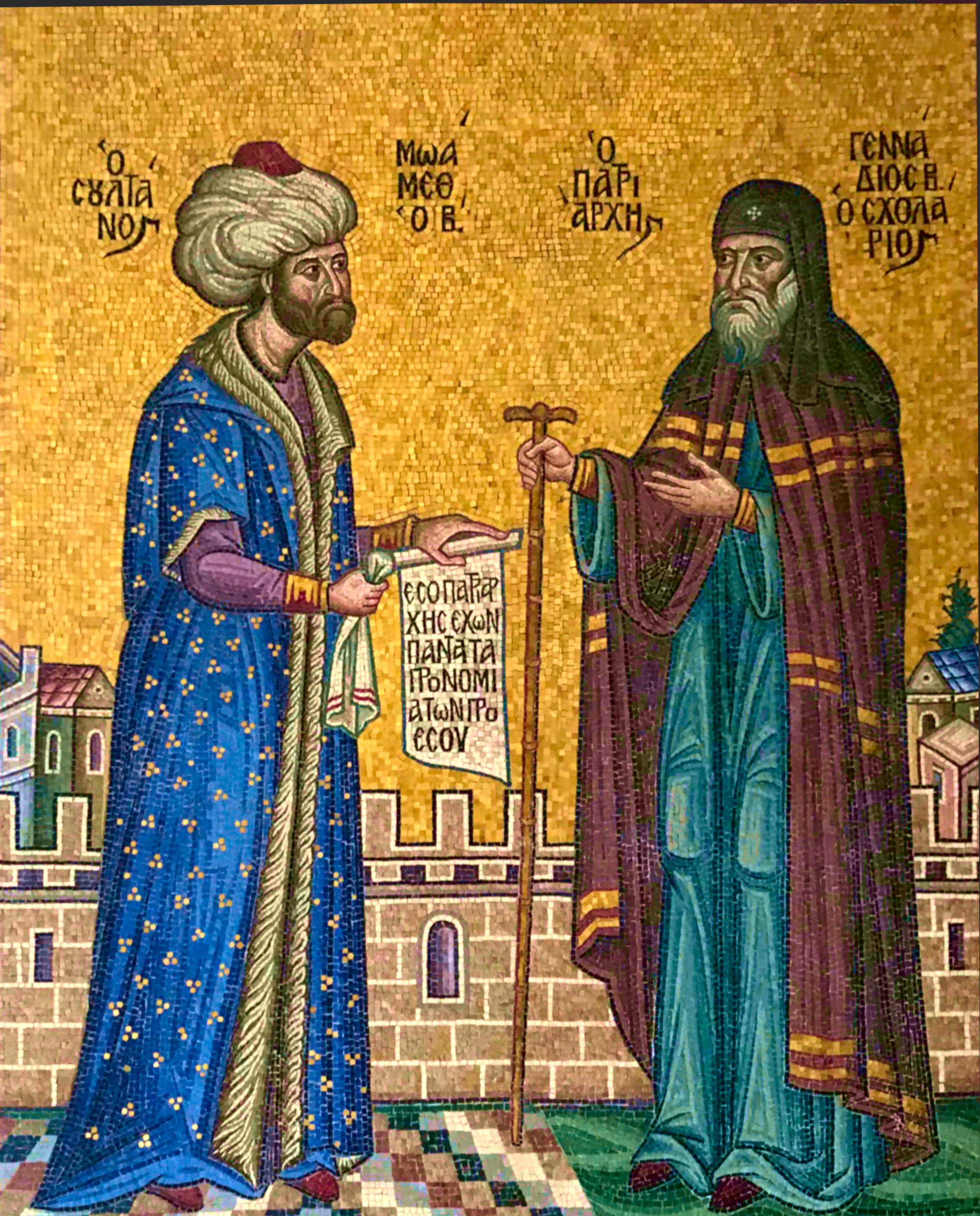
Patriarch Gennadius II with Mehmed II depicted on a 20th-century mosaic

After the fall of Constantinople, Gennadius was taken prisoner by the Turks. In administering his new conquest, 21-year-old conquering Sultan Mehmed II wished to assure the loyalty of the Greek population and above all avoid them appealing to the Latins for liberation, potentially sparking a new round of Crusades. Mehmed II therefore sought the most anti-Latin cleric he could find as a figure of unity for the Greeks under Turkish rule – and Gennadius as leading anti-Union figure was a natural choice. On 1 June 1453, just three days after the fall of the city, the new Patriarch's procession passed through the streets where Mehmed II received Gennadius II graciously and himself invested him with the signs of his office – the crosier (dikanikion) and mantle. This ceremonial investiture would be repeated by all sultans and patriarchs thereafter.

Before the conquest of Constantinople, the rivalry between the Orthodox and Catholic Churches had significantly weakened the power of the Ecumenical Patriarchate of Constantinople, leading to internal divisions among its clergy. This tumultuous period resulted in the inability to appoint a new patriarch following the resignation of Athanasius II of Constantinople. After the city's conquest, Mehmed II ordered the selection and traditional consecration of a new patriarch according to the wishes of the Greeks, appointing Gennadius as the Patriarch of the Orthodox Church of Constantinople.

Mehmed II conferred upon the new Patriarch the title of millet Başkanı' (Head of the Nation), thereby authorising him to oversee all matters concerning his co-religionists. In a gesture reminiscent of the practices of Byzantine emperors, Mehmed II personally presented the Patriarch with the crosier and crown, symbols of his ecclesiastical authority. This act of investiture, accompanied by Janissary guards, safely paraded the new Patriarch through the city, introducing him to the populace and marking a seamless continuation of the ceremonial traditions of the Byzantine Empire into the Ottoman era.

The city's famous patriarchal basilica, the Hagia Sophia, had already been converted into a mosque by the conquerors, so Gennadius II established his seat at the Church of the Holy Apostles. Three years later the edifice, which was in a dilapidated state (in 1461 it was demolished by the Ottomans to make way for the Fatih Mosque), was abandoned by the Patriarch, who moved again to the Church of the Pammakaristos.

The Ottomans divided their Empire into millets or subject nations, of which the Greeks were the largest, known as the Rum Millet. The Patriarch was appointed the official head or Ethnarch of the Greek millet, which was used as the Ottomans as a source for imperial administrators. Gennadius II became a political authority as well as a religious one, as were all his successors under the Ottomans.

As was normal when a monk or lay scholar was appointed patriarch, Gennadius was consecutively ordained, first as a deacon, then as a priest, then finally as a bishop before being appointed patriarch.

=== Patriarch ===
In the spring of 1454 he was consecrated by the metropolitan of Heraclea Perinthus, but, since both the Church of Hagia Sophia and the palace of the patriarch were now in the hands of the Ottomans, he took up his residence successively in two monasteries of the city. While holding the episcopal office Gennadius II drew up, apparently for the use of Mehmed, a confession or exposition of the Christian faith, which was translated into Turkish by Ahmed, Qadi of Berrhoea (and first printed in Greek and Latin by A. Brassicanus at Vienna in 1530).

Gennadius II was unhappy as patriarch, and tried to abdicate his position at least twice; in 1456 he resigned. The full reason for this step commonly attributed to his disappointment at the sultan's treatment of Christians, though Mehmed II seems to have kept the fairly tolerant conditions he had allowed to them; various writers hint at other motives. Eventually, he found the tensions between the Greeks and the Ottomans overwhelming.

He was later called two times to guide the Christian community as Patriarch during the turbulent period that followed the patriarchate of Isidore II of Constantinople. There is no consensus among scholars about the exact dates of his last two patriarchates: according to Kiminas (2009), he reigned again from April 1463 to June 1463 and from autumn 1464 to autumn 1465. Blanchet objects to the existence itself of these two additional terms.

Gennadius II then, like so many of his successors, ended his days as an ex-patriarch and a monk. He lived in the monastery of John the Baptist near Serrae in Macedonia, where he wrote books until he died in about 1472.

Gennadius II fills an important place in Byzantine history. He was the last of the old school of polemical writers and one of the greatest. Unlike most of his fellows he had an intimate acquaintance with Latin theological literature, especially with St. Thomas Aquinas and other Scholastics. He was as skillful an opponent of Catholic theology as Mark of Ephesus, and a more learned one. However, his opposition to Aquinas can be overstated. Marcus Plested observes that Gennadius II's "love and esteem for Thomas was to continued undimmed throughout his career although he would often accentuate the note of caution in later works". Despite his cautions Gennadius writes of Thomas "We love this divinely-inspired and wise man".

His writings show him to be a student not only of Western philosophy but of controversy with Jews and Muslims, of the great Hesychast question (he attacked Barlaam of Seminara and defended the monks; naturally, the Barlaamites were "latinophrones"), in short, of all the questions that were important in his time. He has another kind of importance as the first Patriarch of Constantinople under the Ottomans. From this point of view, he stands at the head of a new period in the history of his Church; the principles that regulated the condition of Orthodox Christians in the Ottoman Empire are the result of Mehmed II's arrangement with him.

== Writings ==
About 100 to 120 of his alleged writings exist, some of which have never been published, and some of which are of doubtful authenticity. As far as is known, his writings may be classified into philosophical (interpretations of Aristotle, Porphyry and others), translations of Peter of Spain and Thomas Aquinas, defenses of Aristotelianism against the recrudescence of Neoplatonism and theological and ecclesiastical (partly concerning the union and partly defending Christianity against Muslims, Jews, and pagans), in addition to numerous homilies, hymns, and letters.

Gennadius II was a prolific writer during all the periods of his life. The complete works of Gennadius II were published in eight volumes by Jugie, Petit & Siderides, 1928–1936. (Note: this edition supersedes the references made below.)

=== First Period (pro-Union) ===
The chief works of this time are the "speeches" made at the Council of Florence, also a number of letters addressed to various friends, bishops, and statesmen, mostly unedited. An Apology for five chapters of the Council of Florence is doubtful. A History of the Council of Florence under his name (in manuscript only) is really identical with that of Syropulos.

=== Second Period (anti-Union) ===
A great number of polemical works against Latins were written in this time. Two books about the Procession of the Holy Ghost; another one "against the insertion of the Filioque in the Creed"; two books and a letter about "Purgatory"; various sermons and speeches; a Panegyric of Mark of Ephesus (in 1447), etc. Some translations of works of Saint Thomas Aquinas, and polemical treatises against his theology by Gennadius II are still unedited, as is also his work against the Barlaamites. However, his hostility toward Aquinas can be overstated. Marcus Plested observes that Gennadius II's "love and esteem for Thomas was to continue undimmed throughout his career although he would often accentuate the note of caution in later works". Despite his cautions, Gennadius writes of Thomas "We love this divinely-inspired and wise man".

There are also various philosophical treatises of which the chief is a Defence of Aristotle (antilepseis hyper Aristotelous) against the Neoplatonist, Gemistos Plethon.

His most important work is easily his "Confession" (Ekthesis tes pisteos ton orthodoxon christianon, generally known as Homologia tou Gennadiou) addressed to Mehmed II. It contains twenty articles, of which however only the first twelve are authentic. It was written in Greek; Achmed, Qadi of Berrhoea, translated it into Turkish. This is the first (in date) of the Orthodox Symbolic books. It was published first (in Greek and Latin) by Brassicanus (Vienna, 1530), and again by Chytræus (Frankfurt, 1582). Martin Crusius printed it in Greek, Latin, and Turkish (in Greek and Latin script) in his Turco-Græcia (Basle, 1584 reprinted in Patrologia Graeca, CLX 333, sqq.). Rimmel reprinted it (Greek and Latin) (in his Monumenta fidei Eccl. Orient., (Jena, 1850), I, 1–10.); and Michalcescu in Greek only. There exists an arrangement of this Confession in the form of a dialogue in which Mehmed asks questions ("What is God?" – "Why is he called theos?" – "And how many Gods are there?" and so on) and Gennadius II gives suitable answers. This is called variously Gennadius II's Dialogue (dialexis, διάλεξις), or Confessio prior, or De Via salutis humanæ (Peri tes hodou tes soterias anthropon). Rimmel prints it first, in Latin only, and thinks it was the source of the Confession. It is more probably a later compilation made from the Confession by someone else. It should be noticed that Gennadius II's (quasi-Platonic) philosophy is in evidence in his Confession (God cannot be interpreted, theos from theein, etc.; cf. Rimmel). Either for the same reason or to spare Muslim susceptibility he avoids the word Prosopa in explaining the Trinity, speaking of the three Persons as idiomata "which we call Hypostases".

=== Third Period (post-resignation) ===
During the third period, from his resignation to his death (1459–1468), he continued writing theological and polemical works. An encyclical letter to all Christians In defence of his resignation is unedited, as are also a Dialogue with two Turks about the divinity of Christ, and a work about the Adoration of God, Jahn (Anecdota græca) has published a Dialogue between a Christian and a Jew and a collection of Prophecies about Christ gathered from the Old Testament. A treatise, About our God, one in three, against Atheists and Polytheists, is chiefly directed against the theory that the world may have been formed by chance. Five books, About the Foreknowledge and Providence of God and a Treatise on the manhood of Christ, are also in Patrologia Graeca, CLX. Lastly, there are many homilies by Gennadius II, most of which exist only in manuscript at Mount Athos.

== In popular culture ==
- In the 2012 film Fetih 1453, Gennadius II is played by Adnan Kürtçü.
- Gennadius II is a significant character in Peter Sandham’s historical novel Porphyry and Ash which covers the final year of the Byzantine Empire and the controversy of the act of union.
- Appears in novel The Dark Angel by Mika Waltari.
- In the Turkish TV series Mehmed: Fetihler Sultanı, Ulvi Alacakaptan portrays the role of Gennadius.

== See also ==
- Greek scholars in the Renaissance

== Bibliography ==
- Blanchet, Marie-Hélène (2001). "Georges Gennadios Scholarios a-t-il été trois fois patriarche de constantinople?". Byzantion: Revue Internationale des Études Byzantines (in French). 71 (1). Bruxelles: 60–72.
- Kappes, Christiaan W. (2013a). "Idolizing paganism – demonizing Christianity à propos N. Siniossoglou: radical Platonism in Byzantium: illumination and utopia in Gemistos Plethon". Archiv für Mittelalterliche Philosophie und Kultur. 19: 210–243.
- Kappes, Christiaan W. (2013b). "The Latin sources of the Palamite theology of George-Gennadius Scholarius". Nicolaus. 40 (1): 71–113.
- Kiminas, Demetrius (2009). The Ecumenical Patriarchate - A History of Its Metropolitanates with Annotated Hierarch Catalogs. Wildside Press. ISBN 9781434458766.
- Michalcescu, Jon (1904). Die Bekenntnisse und die wichtigsten Glaubenszeugnisse der griechisch-orientalischen Kirche.
- Monfasani, J. (2011). "The pro-Latin apologetics of the Greek émigrés to quattrocento Italy". Byzantine Theology and its Philosophical Background. Studies in Byzantine History and Civilization. Vol. 4. A. Rigo.

Eastern Orthodox Church titles
Preceded by Athanasius II	Ecumenical Patriarch of Constantinople; 1454 – 1456	Succeeded by Isidore II
Preceded by Joasaph I	Ecumenical Patriarch of Constantinople; 1463	Succeeded by Sophronius I
Preceded by Sophronius I	Ecumenical Patriarch of Constantinople; 1464 – 1465	Succeeded by Mark II
