= George of Baden =

Roman Catholic bishop

George of Baden (1433 – February 11, 1484) was Bishop of Metz.

Coat-of-arms of Baden.

He was the fourth son of Jacob, Margrave of Baden-Baden and Catherine de Lorraine (1407–1439).
He entered the church in 1445 and studied in Erfurt, Pavia and Cologne. In 1456, he became Coadjutor bishop to the Bishop of Mainz, Conrad II Bayer of Boppard. When Boppard died in 1459, Georg of Baden became the new bishop. He entered Metz only in 1461, in the company of 700 cavalry. In the meantime he had become involved in the Bavarian War (1459–63), where he was defeated and taken prisoner in the Battle of Seckenheim. He was released after paying a large ransom.

He then tried to reconquer the cities lost in 1444 to the Duchy Lorraine under René of Anjou, but had to cede the city of Épinal in 1466. In 1473 he forged an alliance with Charles the Bold and helped to arrange the marriage between Maximilian of Austria and Mary of Burgundy. He died in Moyenvic.
