= Bavarian War (1459–1463) =

Military conflict

The Bavarian War from 1459 to 1463, also known as the Princes' War, was a result of the expansionist ambitions of the two warring Principalities, pitting Margrave, later Elector, Albert Achilles from the House of Hohenzollern, which by this time had already annexed the principalities of Brandenburg-Kulmbach and Brandenburg-Ansbach, against Duke Louis "the Rich" of Bavaria-Landshut from the House of Wittelsbach.

== Background ==
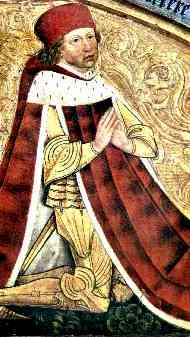
Elector Albrecht Achilles, Predella from St. Gumbertus, Ansbach (1484)

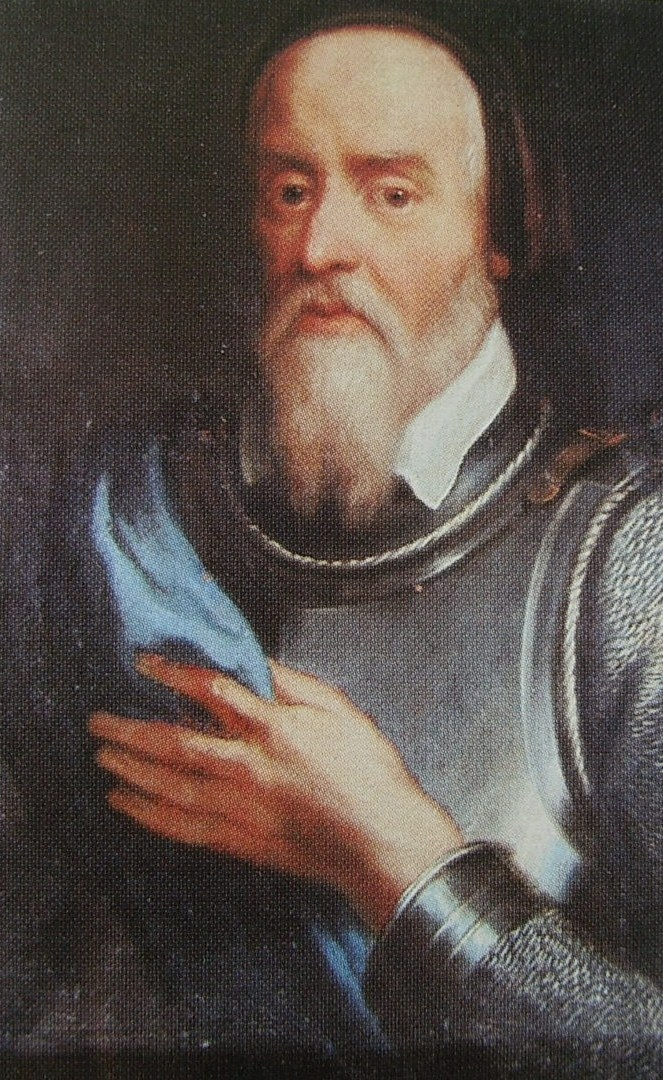
Duke Louis the Rich, representation from the 16th century

Albert Achilles tried to expand the jurisdiction of his courts, as part of his attempt to extend his influence over neighbouring areas. For this purpose, he tried to raise his Burgraviate Court at Nuremberg to an Imperial Court. This would have given him jurisdiction over the neighbouring principalities and the possibility to override decisions of subordinate courts. He also had in mind a plan to re-establish the Duchy of Franconia, with himself as Duke. The Prince-Bishopric of Würzburg had similar plans; neither party managed to implement them.

The territory of Duke Louis the Rich of Bavaria-Landshut had recently grown considerably by the incorporation of Bavaria-Ingolstadt.

== Alliances ==
Albert Achilles managed to make a credible case to Emperor Frederick that the Hohenzollern interests in Bavaria happened to coincide with the Imperial interests. After Louis the Rich had created a casus belli by taking the Free Imperial City of Donauwörth, the Emperor outlawed Louis and tasked Albert Achilles with implementing this verdict.

Both sides drew in allies with different interests and the conflict spread through southern and central Germany and even the Bohemian King George of Poděbrady participated.

Among Albert Achilles's allies were Margrave Charles of Baden-Baden, Count Ulrich V of Württemberg, his brother Elector Frederick II of Brandenburg, the Electorate of Mainz, Duke William III of Saxony, and Landgrave Louis II of Hesse. Among Louis's allies were Elector Palatine Frederick "the Victorious", also of the House of Wittelsbach, Count Palatine Otto I of Mosbach, and the Prince-Bishops Rudolf von Scherenberg of Würzburg and Philip of Henneberg of Bamberg, and later also the Bohemian King George of Poděbrady.

== Course of the war ==
In 1460, it looked like Louis had won: his army had penetrated deep into Albert Achilles's land and forced him to accept the transfer of territory known as the Judgement of Roth. Louis the Rich also attacked the Bishopric of Eichstätt under Prince-Bishop John III of Eych,

However, in 1461, Albert Achilles had enough allies on his side to be able to reject this judgement. Louis the Rich was still stronger militarily and occupied more land in the Margraviate. The emperor then intervened and tasked the King of Bohemia with negotiating a cease-fire in Prague. Meanwhile, Louis continued to attack neutral cities. He completely destroyed some of them.

Two important battles were fought in 1462: the Battle of Seckenheim in June 1462, where Louis's ally Frederick "the Victorious" managed to take the Imperial captains Charles of Baden-Baden and Ulrich V of Württemberg captive, and the Battle of Geingen, which was won by Louis.

== Aftermath ==
A compromise was reached: Albert Achilles dropped his claims of imperial jurisdiction and Louis returned the territories he had occupied. Further negotiations in Prague led to a peace treaty.

The alliances and results of this war are intertwined with other conflicts fought simultaneously in other parts of Germany, such as the Mainz feud.

== Situation in the Sechsämterland in 1462 ==
An army from Bohemia and Cheb invaded the Sechsämterland in 1462 and caused significant damage by looting and pillaging. The Amtmann, Frederick of Dobeneck, at Thierstein Castle set fire to the village of Thierstein to prevent the enemy troops from entrenching in it. Because he had allowed the villagers of Theirstein to seek refuge in the castle, he was unable to resiste a lengthy siege and had to surrender. The Bohemians went on to capture Hohenberg Castle and burned down the city of Weißenstadt.

According to legend, Frederick of Sparneck vowed that he would found a monastery if he would be spared the ravages of war. As he was spared, he founded Sparneck Abbey.

At the Katharinenberg bei Wunsiedel, Jobst of Schirnding managed to drive the Bohemians back, after a six-week unsuccessful siege of the city. The church on the Katharinenberg was destroyed during the siege and has been a ruin ever since. His success was, however, not the result of military strength — the invading armies were far stronger — but due to internal conflicts between the Bohemians and the troops from Eger (Eger region being German speaking and Catholic, while Czech-speaking Bohemians were mostly Hussitic). Several villages in the Eger area were destroyed by the retreating Bohemian army. Local sources distinguish between a "longer" and a "closer" Hussite raid, thus linking the event to the Hussite Wars.
