= Joasaph I of Constantinople =

Ecumenical Patriarch of Constantinople from 1462 to 1463

- Ecumenical Patriarch of Constantinople
- Church: Church of Constantinople
- In office: 1 April 1462 – 10 April 1463
- Predecessor: Isidore II of Constantinople
- Successor: Gennadius II of Constantinople

Personal details
- Born: Antony Kokkas
- Died: After 1463
- Denomination: Eastern Orthodoxy

Joasaph I of Constantinople (Greek: Ἰωάσαφ Κόκκας (Ioasaf Kokkas); died after 1463) was Ecumenical Patriarch of Constantinople in the 1460s. The exact dates of his reign are disputed by scholars at various times ranging from 1462 to 1465.

== Life ==
Antony Kokkas was born probably to Western parents and he became a monk. According to Laurent and Kiminas he was elected as Patriarch with the name of Joasaph I on 1 April 1462, in a rush the day after the death of Patriarch Isidore II of Constantinople. During his patriarchate, he had to face troubles caused by clashes with monks and intrigues of the Greek nobility.

The intrigue that led to the tragic end of Joasaph's patriarchate involved the scholar and politician George Amiroutzes, renowned for having persuaded Emperor David of Trebizond to surrender to the Ottomans, and who, along with all the nobility of the former Empire of Trebizond, had moved to Constantinople. George Amiroutzes had become an intimate of Sultan Mehmed II and wanted to marry the beautiful Mouchliotissa, widow of last Duke of Athens Francesco II Acciaioli, notwithstanding that he was already married and his wife was still alive. Patriarch Joasaph I refused to grant his permission because it was a case of bigamy under canon law. George Amiroutzes pressed forward and turned to his cousin, the Grand vizier Mahmud Pasha Angelović, who tried to influence the Holy Synod to depose Joasaph I. Some scholars propose different details for these events.

Irritated by the refusal of Joasaph I to allow the new marriage of Amiroutzes, Sultan Mehmed II ordered the Patriarch's humiliation by cutting his beard and punished also the Megas Ekklesiarches (i.e. Head Sacristan) Manuel, the future Patriarch Maximus III of Constantinople, by cutting his nose. These events led Joasaph I to a state of depression which culminated in his attempted suicide: the day of Easter 1463 (10 April) he deliberately threw himself in the cistern beneath the Pammakaristos Church.

Joasaph I was rescued, deposed and exiled to Anchialos, opening the way for George Amiroutzes to marry his new wife.

== Disputed chronology ==
The chronology of the reign of Joasaph I is disputed among scholars. Recent scholarship, such as Kiminas (2009), Podskalsky (1988), Laurent (1968) and Runciman (1985) place the reign of Joasaph I after Isidore II of Constantinople and before Sophronius I of Constantinople, dating it between 1 April 1462 and Easter (10 April) 1463.

Other scholars, following Bishop Gemanos of Sardeis (1933–1938) and Grumel (1958), as well as the official website of the Ecumenical Patriarchate, propose that Joasaph I reigned after Sophronius I and before Mark II of Constantinople, suggesting that his reign begun in early 1465 (or July 1465) and ended in first months of 1466. Blanchet (2001) places the beginning of the reign of Joasaph I in summer 1464 directly after Sophronius I.

Furthermore, there is no consensus among scholars on the length and chronology of the second and third terms of Gennadius II of Constantinople which supposedly alternated the patriarchates of Joasaph I and Sophronius I. For a comparison of the main scholar suggestions, see the Ecumenical Patriarch of Constantinople.

== Bibliography ==
- Kiminas, Demetrius (2009). The Ecumenical Patriarchate - A History of Its Metropolitanates with Annotated Hierarch Catalogs. Wildside Press. ISBN 9781434458766.
- Laurent, Vitalien (1968). "Les premiers patriarches de Constantinople sous la domination turque (1454–1476) - Succession et chronologie d'après un catalogue inédit". Revue des études byzantines. 26: 229–263. doi:10.3406/rebyz.1968.1407.
- Runciman, Steven (1985) [1968]. The Great Church in Captivity - A Study of the Patriarchate of Constantinople from the Eve of the Turkish Conquest to the Greek War of Independence (2nd ed.). Cambridge University Press. ISBN 9780521313100.

Eastern Orthodox Church titles
Preceded by Isidore II	Ecumenical Patriarch of Constantinople; 1462 – 1463	Succeeded by Gennadius II
