= Isidore II of Constantinople =

Ecumenical Patriarch of Constantinople from 1456 to 1462

- Ecumenical Patriarch of Constantinople
- Church: Church of Constantinople
- In office: January 1456 – 31 March 1462
- Predecessor: Gennadius II of Constantinople
- Successor: Joasaph I of Constantinople

Personal details
- Died: 31 March 1462
- Denomination: Eastern Orthodoxy

Isidore II of Constantinople (Greek: Ἰσίδωρος Ξανθόπουλος; died 31 March 1462) was Ecumenical Patriarch of Constantinople from 1456 to 1462.

== Life ==
Little is known about the life and the patriarchate of Isidore except that he was an ethnic Greek and member of Greek community in Constantinople. His surname derives from the Xanthopoulon monastery in Constantinople which he entered, becoming a hieromonk and later rising to be its abbot. Isidore worked alongside Gennadius II of Constantinople during the Council of Florence and was one of the signatories of a 1445 document against the East-West Union of Churches. In this period, Isidore was deemed the spiritual father of the Greek community in Constantinople. Immediately prior to his election, he was serving as the Metropolitan bishop of Heraclea.

After the resignation of Gennadius II of Constantinople as Patriarch in January 1456, Isidore was elected to succeed him. He obtained the confirmation from Sultan Mehmed II, and he was consecrated bishop in the Pammakaristos Church.

His reign lasted up to his death on 31 March 1462, and he was succeeded by Patriarch Joasaph I of Constantinople.

== Bibliography ==
- Kiminas, Demetrius (2009). The Ecumenical Patriarchate - A History of Its Metropolitanates with Annotated Hierarch Catalogs. Wildside Press.
- Laurent, Vitalien (1968). "Les premiers patriarches de Constantinople sous la domination turque (1454–1476) - Succession et chronologie d'après un catalogue inédit". Revue des études byzantines. 26: 229–263. doi:10.3406/rebyz.1968.1407.
- Runciman, Steven (1985) [1968]. The Great Church in Captivity - A Study of the Patriarchate of Constantinople from the Eve of the Turkish Conquest to the Greek War of Independence (2nd ed.). Cambridge University Press.

Eastern Orthodox Church titles
Preceded by Gennadius II	Ecumenical Patriarch of Constantinople; 1456 – 1462	Succeeded by Joasaph I
