= Diether von Isenburg =

- Archbishop and Elector of Mainz
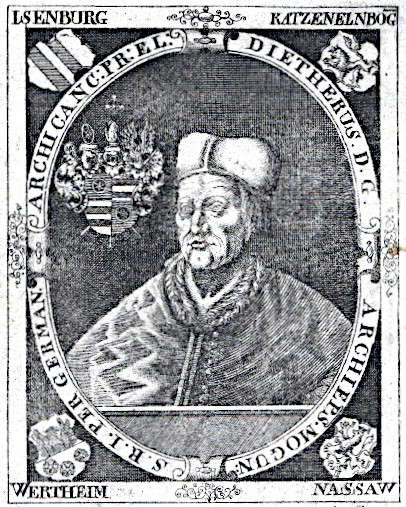
- Church: Catholic Church
- Archdiocese: Mainz
- In office: 1459–1461 and 1475–1482

Personal details
- Born: c. 1412 Büdingen
- Died: May 7, 1482 Aschaffenburg
- Buried: Mainz Cathedral; 49°59′56″N 8°16′26″E
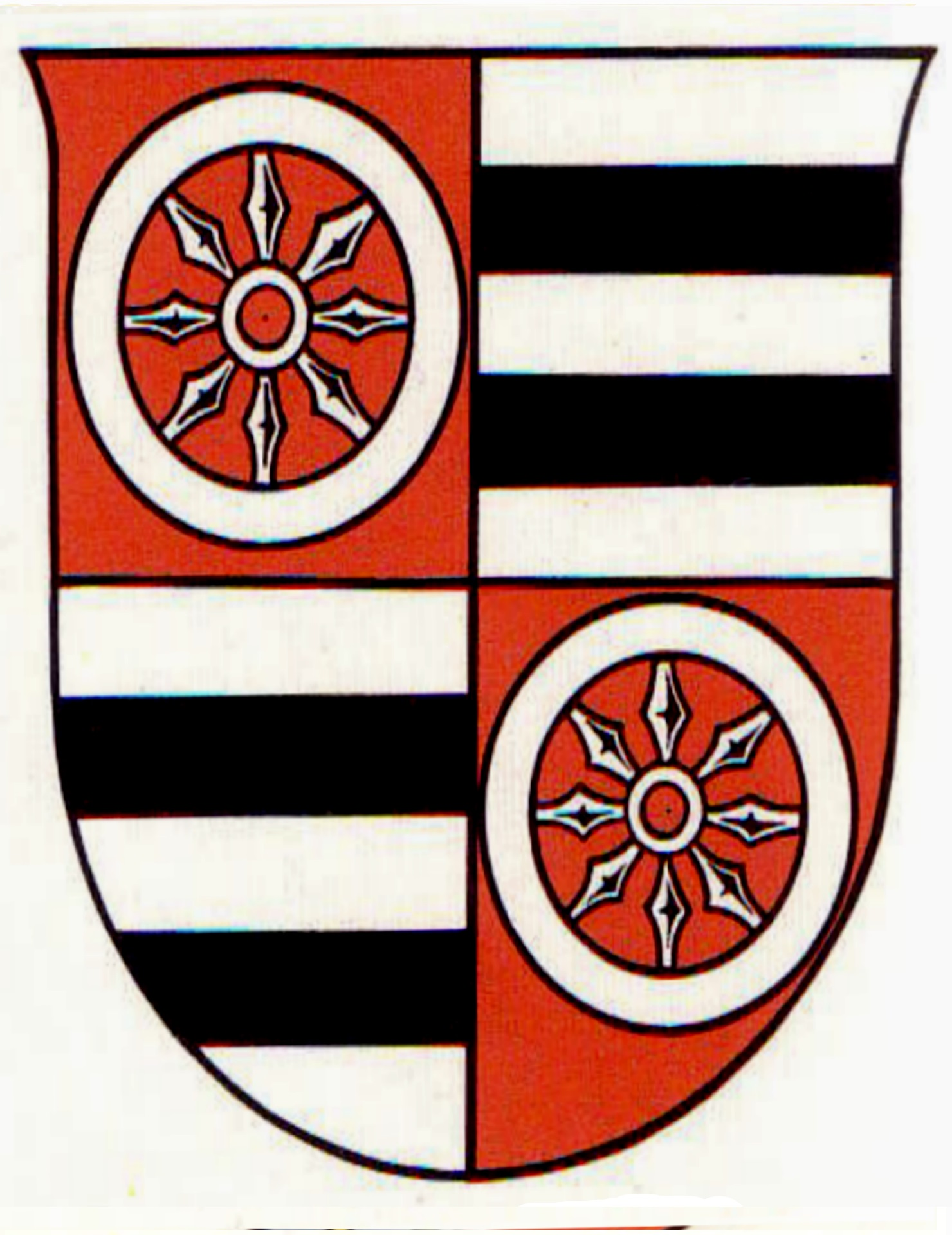
- Coat of arms

Diether von Isenburg (c. 1412 – 7 May 1482) was twice Archbishop (1459–1461 and 1475–1482) and founder of the University of Mainz. As Archbishop of Mainz, he was ex officio Elector and Lord Chancellor of Germany.

== Biography ==
Diether was a son of Diether I, count of Isenburg-Büdingen. Early in childhood he was sent into a religious life. He was educated in Cologne and later Erfurt.

In 1427 he became a member of Mainz Cathedral, in 1434 a rector in Erfurt, and in 1453 a cathedral vicar. In 1456 the cathedral chapter of Trier elected John II of Baden against Diether. On 18 June 1459 he was elected the Archbishop of Mainz with a clear majority over Adolph of Nassau-Wiesbaden-Idstein, although never confirmed by the Pope.

In 1461 he went to Nuremberg for Imperial and Papal reform, and its recommendations earned him the wrath of both the Emperor Frederick III and Pope Pius II.

Diether refused to cease reforms in the church, and thus Pius II declared Adolph of Nassau the Archbishop of Mainz, beginning the Mainz Feud. The archdiocese was wracked by violent warfare. On the night of 28 October 1462 Adolph captured the city of Mainz, killed 400 citizens and had another 400 including Johannes Gutenberg exiled, and revoked its town charter and status as an Imperial City. However Diether did not leave the city until 1463. When Adolph died in 1475 he recommended Diether be his successor, and on 9 November that year he was again elected. The reformist Pope Sixtus IV confirmed him. In 1477 Diether donated the University of Mainz to the city.

He died in Aschaffenburg in 1482 and was buried in Mainz Cathedral.

Preceded by Theodoric Schenk	Archbishop of Mainz; 1460-1461	Succeeded by Adolf III
Preceded by Adolf III	Archbishop of Mainz; 1475-1482	Succeeded by Adalbert III
