= Adolf II (archbishop of Mainz) =

German Christian leader

Adolph II
- Archbishop of Mainz
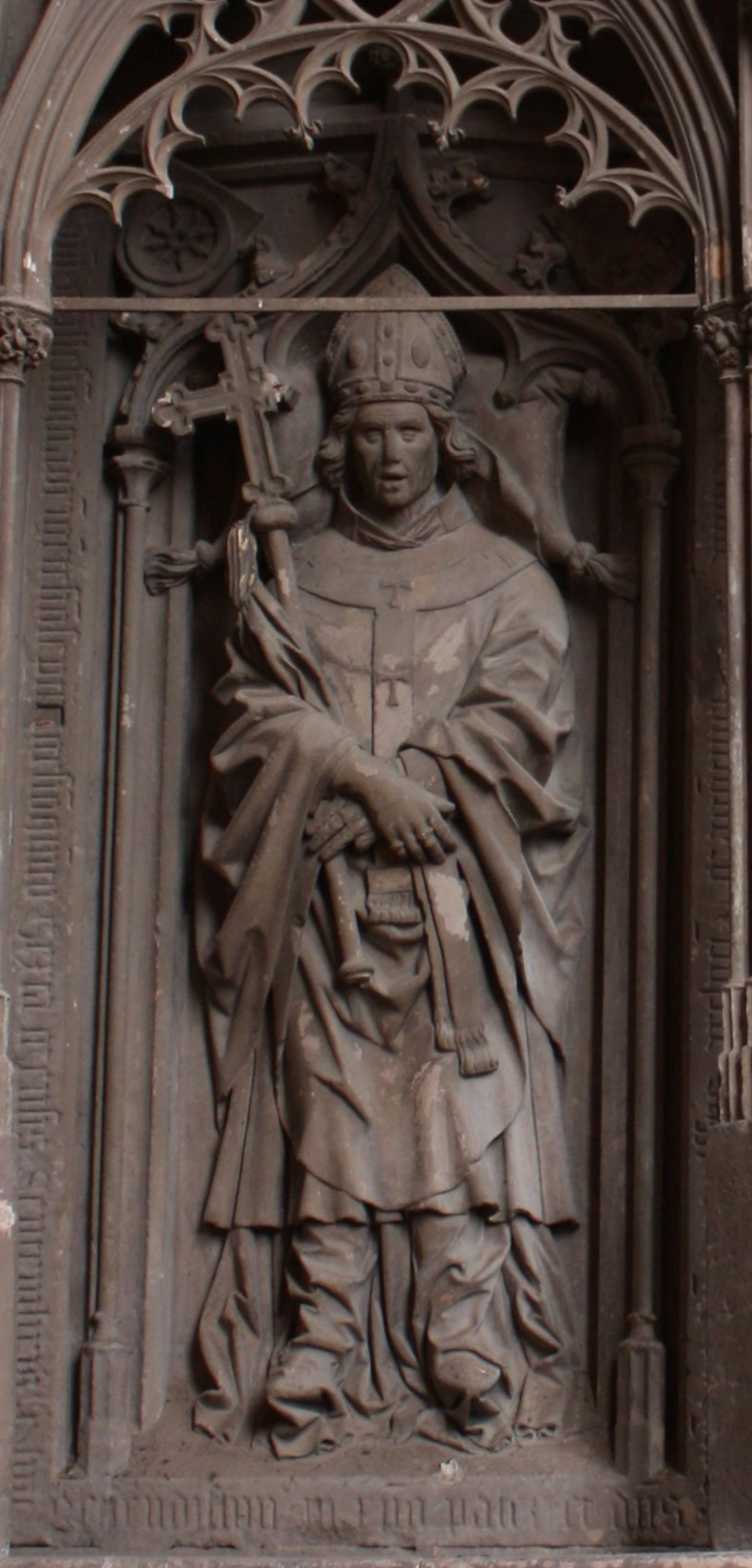
- Church: Catholic Church
- Diocese: Electorate of Mainz
- In office: 1461–1475

Personal details
- Born: c. 1423
- Died: 6 September 1475

Adolf von Nassau-Wiesbaden-Idstein (c. 1423 – 6 September 1475) was the archbishop of Mainz as Adolf II (or Adolph II) from 1461 until 1475.

Adolph was a son of Count Adolph II of Nassau-Wiesbaden-Idstein.

In 1459 he was defeated in the election to the Archbishopric of Mainz by Theodoric of Isenburg-Büdingen. In 1461 Pope Pius II declared Adolph the archbishop of Mainz following the confrontational reforms of Theodoric. Since the city of Mainz and its cathedral chapter remained loyal to Theodoric, Adolph declared war. The devastating Mainz Diocesan Feud continued for a year until, on 28 October 1462, Adolph captured the town. Some 400 citizens he had killed, and another 400 fled abroad. Adolph also revoked Mainz's privileges and its status as a Free City.

Adolph died in Eltville in 1475 and was buried in the Eberbach Abbey.

== Literature ==
- Aloys Schmidt: Zur Mainzer Stiftsfehde 1462, in: JbBistumMainz 3, 1948, pg. 89–99
- Karl Menzel: Die Verträge zwischen den Grafen Adolf von Nassau und Diether von Isenburg-Büdingen zur Beilegung des Streits um das Erzstift Mainz, in: Nassauische Annalen 10 (1870), pg 1

Preceded by Theodoric of Isenburg-Büdingen	Archbishop of Mainz; 1461–1475	Succeeded by Theodoric of Isenburg-Büdingen
