= 1510s =

Decade

The 1510s decade ran from January 1, 1510, to December 31, 1519.

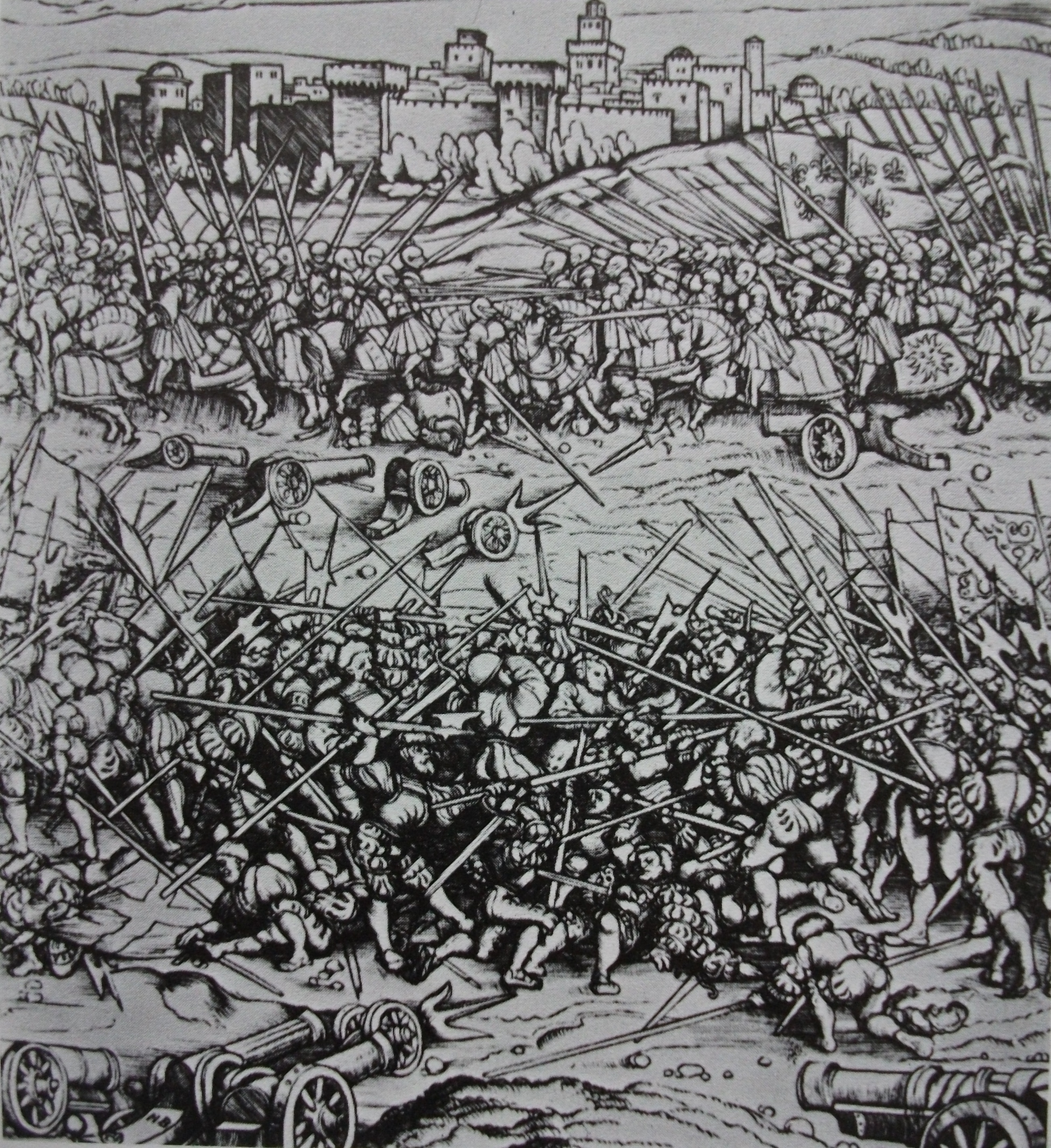
April 11, 1512: Battle of Ravenna

== Events ==
=== 1510 ===
==== January–March ====
- January 23 – An 18-year-old Henry VIII of England jousts anonymously at Richmond, Surrey and draws applause, before revealing his identity.
- January 29 – The Mary Rose ship is laid out. The next year the ship is launched on July 29, 1511, and is afterwards towed to London to be fitted, and is finally completed in 1512. In 1545, during the Battle of the Solent, she sank. The reason for her sinking is disputed with contemporary accounts claiming the ship was heeled over or sank by French ships with gunfire, although modern historians believe it was sunk due to being unstable.
- January 31 – Catherine of Aragon gives birth to her first child, and the first known child of King Henry VIII, a stillborn daughter.
- February 27– Portuguese conquest of Goa: Afonso de Albuquerque of Portugal begins a nine month battle to conquer Goa off the coast of India.
- March 1 – Battle of Salt River: Indigenous ǃUriǁʼaekua decisively defeat sailors of the Portuguese Empire in South Africa.
- March 12 – Mihnea cel Rău, the ruling Prince of Wallachia (now in Romania), is assassinated in Sibiu while attending Mass at the Roman Catholic church there.

==== April–June ====
- April 4 – The "Disturbance of the Three Ports", an uprising by Japanese merchants against the Korean government, begins in what is now South Korea in the cities of Dongnae, Changwon and Ulsan.
- April 13 – Park Won-jong resigns as Chief State Councillor of the Korean Empire and is succeeded by Kim Su-dong.
- April 19 – The simultaneous Japanese uprising in Korea is suppressed by the Korean Emperor Jungjong, and all trade between Korea and Japan is halted for the next two years.
- April 27 – (4th waning of Kason 872 ME In what is now Myanmar, Min Raza, King of Burma as ruler of the Kingdom of Arakan, leaves the capital city of Mrauk-U permanently and relocates to the old capital at Waithali, where he shows little interest in governing his kingdom.
- May 12 – The Prince of Anhua rebellion begins when Zhu Zhifan, Prince of Anhua, kills all the officials invited to a banquet, and declares his intent on ousting the powerful Ming dynasty eunuch Liu Jin, during the reign of the Zhengde Emperor in China.
- May 30 – Rebel leader Zhu Zhifan is defeated and captured by commander Qiu Yue, ending the Prince of Anhua rebellion.
- June 5 – The Sultan Abu Abdallah V of Tlemcen (now part of Algeria) agrees to pay a demand for tribute to the Ferdinand II, King of Aragon (now part of Spain), prompting Ferdinand to plot an invasion of the neighboring kingdom Ifriqiya and its capital, Tripoli.

==== July–September ====
- July 25 – Spanish troops capture Tripoli at the direction of King Ferdinand II of Aragon and under the command of Pedro Navarro.
- July – The Holy League, formed to defend the Italian States, attacks French-occupied Genoa. The 1510 influenza pandemic reaches Sicily, where it is nicknamed coccolucio, before spreading to the Italian states and the rest of Europe.
- August 10 – The Royal Dano-Norwegian Navy is founded when Henrich Krummedige is appointed chief captain of all those who are at sea.
- September 3 – Sir Thomas More becomes undersheriff of the City of London.
- September 10 – (Eishō 7, 18th day of the 8th month) An estimated 6.7 magnitude earthquake in the Seto Inland Sea (Setonaikai) strikes oof the coast of Japan near what is now Nanko-Higashi.

==== October–December ====
- October 10 – (Eishō 7, 8th day of the 9th month) An earthquake in the Enshunada Sea off of the coast of Hamamatsu in what is now the Shizuoka Prefecture in Japan produces a devastating tsunami.
- October 16 – Mingyi Nyo declares independence from the Ava Kingdom in upper Burma, by establishing the Toungoo dynasty.
- November 25 – Afonso de Albuquerque succeeds in conquering Goa and establishes the colony of Portuguese India.
- December 2 – Battle of Marv: Shah Ismail I's defeats the Uzbek forces of Shaybani Khan, in Khorasan. Shaybani flees the battle only to be captured and killed by Ismail I troops, his head is turned into a skull cup used as a drinking goblet.

==== Date unknown ====
- The Grand Prince of Moscow Vasili III conquers Pskov.
- Paolo Cortese publishes De Cardinalatu, a manual for cardinals, including advice on palatial architecture – which inspires Thomas Wolsey in his construction work at Hampton Court Palace.
- Sunflowers are brought to Europe by Spaniards.

=== 1511 ===
==== January–March ====
- January 19 – The Siege of Mirandola by the Papal States, with help from the Duchy of Urbino and Spanish and Venetian troops, ends with the capture of Mirandola after 18 days of fighting. The Pope personally leads the troops and, after the outnumbered defenders surrender, works at preventing his troops from pillaging the city or harming the residents.
- February 12 – King Henry VIII of England opens the two-day Westminster Tournament to celebrate the birth (on January 1) of his son Prince Henry. Sadly, the infant prince dies on February 22, nine days after the tournament's end. The festivities are later memorialized in the 1511 Westminster Tournament Roll, a series of 36 separately painted pictures stitched together to form a roll almost 60 feet (18 m) long and 14 3/4 inches (37.5 cm) wide.
- February 14 – The League of Cambrai, formed in 1508 by the Papal States, the Kingdom of France and the Holy Roman Empire is dissolved as Spain and the Holy Roman Empire withdraw and ally against France.
- February 22 – (9th waning of Tabaung 872 ME In what is now Myanmar, King Shwenankyawshin Narapati II of Ava dedicates his "exquisite golden palace".
- February 27 – In Italy, on "Fat Thursday", a Christian celebration marking the last days of feasting before the period of fasting during the Roman Catholic Lent, discontented citizens of Friuli stage a revolt against their Venetian occupiers and attack the city of Udine and invade the palaces of several members of nobility, murdering the wealthy families and plundering the palace contents. Special troops arrive from Gradisca d'Isonzo on March 1 and suppress the rebellion.
- March 11 – On the island of Puerto Rico, Spanish conquistador Juan Ponce de León leads an incursion at Yahuecas against the local Taino warriors, commanded by Chief Urayoán.
- March 26 – A 6.9 magnitude earthquake strikes Slovenia and Italy and kills more than 10,000 people, striking with a maximum Mercalli intensity of X (Extreme). The epicenter is around the town of Idrija in present-day Slovenia, although some place it some 15-20 kilometers to the west, between Gemona and Pulfero in Friulian Slovenia. The earthquake affects a large territory between Carinthia, Friuli, present-day Slovenia and Croatia.

==== April–June ====
- April 9
  - St John's College, Cambridge, England, founded by Lady Margaret Beaufort, receives its charter.
  - The Şahkulu Rebellion breaks out in Anatolia.
- May 16 – Five Roman Catholic cardinals, including Federico di Sanseverino, sign a document calling upon Pope Julius II to convene a council in Pisa to discuss reform of the Roman Catholic Church, to take place on September 1. After the Pope threatens him with excommunication, Sanseverino elects not to attend.
- May 23 – French troops capture the Italian city of Bologna after a two-day battle.
- June 21 – in Spain, Queen Queen Joanna of Castile creates the Consulate of the Sea for the port of Bilbao.

==== July–September ====
- July 2 – The Şahkulu rebellion, which had started in Anatolia by Sakhulu Baba, against the Ottoman Empire on April 9, is suppressed in southeastern Turkey by the Ottoman Grand Vizier, Hadım Ali Pasha and Prince Şehzade Ahmed, son of the Sultan Bayezid II. Sakhulu is subsequently beheaded.
- July 11 – Pope Julius II summons Catholic clerics to meet at the Fifth Council of the Lateran, directing them to meet on April 19.
- July 25 – Afonso de Albuquerque of Portugal, Governor of Portuguese India, begins an assault on the strategic city of Malacca (now part of Malaysia) and captures it by August 15.
- July 29 – Henry VIII of England's flagship, the Mary Rose, is launched from Portsmouth.
- August 14 – In Rome, the completed first half of Michelangelo's painting of Biblical scenes on the Sistine Chapel ceiling is unveiled for a select group of patrons and church officials. The viewing is open to the public the next day.
- August 15 – (21 Jumada I 917 AH) Capture of Malacca: Afonso de Albuquerque of Portugal conquers Malacca, the capital of the Sultanate of Malacca, giving Portugal control over the Strait of Malacca, through which all sea-going trade between China and India is concentrated. The Sultanate then establishes rule from Johor, starting decades of skirmishes against the Portuguese to regain the fallen city. While taking the city, the Portuguese slaughter a large community of Chinese merchants living there. Malacca is the first city in Southeast Asia to be taken by a Western nation, gaining home rule only in 1957, when it becomes part of Malaysia.
- September 13 – In Japan, Tokudaiji Saneatsu retires from his position as Chancellor of the Realm (Daijō-daijin) after two years of leading the Council of State.

==== October–December ====
- October 1 – During the War of the League of Cambrai Pope Julius II proclaims a Holy League against French dominance in Italy. It is an alliance between the Papal States, the Swiss Confederation, Venice (which had been the opponent of the League of Cambrai) and Aragon. Emperor Maximilian and the English king Henry VIII join the League soon after.
- October 12 – James IV of Scotland's great ship, the Michael, is launched at Newhaven, Edinburgh; she is the largest ship afloat at this date.
- November 17 – The Treaty of Westminster creates an alliance between Henry VIII of England and Ferdinand II of Aragon against France. Mallett and Shaw, The Italian Wars, 103; Hutchinson, Young Henry, 159.
- November 20 – The vessel Frol de la Mar, transporting Afonso de Albuquerque and the valuable treasure of the conquest of Malacca, sinks en route to Goa.
- November 23 – In India, Mahmud Shah Begada, Sultan of Gujarat since 1458, dies at the age of 66 after a reign of more than 50 years. He is succeeded by his eldest son, Prince Shams-ud-Din Muzaffar, who takes the name Muzaffar Shah II.
- December 21 – In an impassioned sermon on the fourth Sunday of Advent at Santo Domingo, Dominican friar Antonio de Montesinos openly denounces the Spanish conquistadors' cruelty and abuse of the Taino people practice of Encomienda (forcible enslavement of non-Christian peoples) on the island of Hispanola. and adds that neither he nor any of his missionaries will allow slaveholders to partake in confession.

==== Date unknown ====
- Diego Velázquez and Hernán Cortés conquer Cuba; Velázquez is appointed Governor.
- Duarte Barbosa arrives in India for the second time. He works as clerk in the factory of Cananor, and as the liaison with the Indian rajah.
- After the fall of Malacca, Afonso de Albuquerque sends Duarte Fernandes on a diplomatic mission to Burma and Siam, becoming the first European to visit these countries diplomatically.
- Ferdinand II of Aragon observes that "one black can do the work of four Indians".
- Juan de Agramonte, a sailor from Spain, is thought possibly to have travelled to Newfoundland.
- The indigenous Taíno people revolt against the Spanish in southwestern Puerto Rico near Guánica.
- The first black slaves arrive in Colombia.
- The Spanish conquest of Yucatán begins.
- Erasmus publishes his most famous work, The Praise of Folly (Laus stultitiae).

=== 1512 ===
==== January–March ====
- January 2 – Svante Nilsson, regent of Sweden since 1504, dies at the age of 51. Eric Trolle is subsequently elected as the new Regent, but will be ousted after only six months.
- January 23 – Neagoe Basarab becomes the new Prince of Wallachia at the capital, Târgoviște, after Prince Prince Vlad V is captured at battle in Bucharest and then decapitated.
- February 18 – War of the League of Cambrai: The French carry out the Sack of Brescia.
- March 12 – Pope Julius II issues the papal bull Dilecte fili, declaring King Louis XII deposed and directing that the French throne be given to King Henry VIII of England.
- March 23 – Donyo Dorje, ruler of the Kingdom of Ü-Tsang and most of Tibet, dies after a reign of more than 30 years and is succeeded by his brother, Ngawang Namgyal.

==== April–June ====
- April 11 – War of the League of Cambrai – Battle of Ravenna: French troops under Gaston of Foix, Duke of Nemours, assisted by the Duchy of Ferrara, defeat the Spanish and Papal States troops led by Ramón de Cardona. Gaston is killed in the pursuit as the Spanish retreat, and at least 3,000 of his troops are killed. More than 9,000 Spanish and Papal troops are killed, and 17,000 civilians in and around the city of Ravenna are massacred.
- May 3 – The Fifth Council of the Lateran begins.
- May 12 – Thomas Howard, 2nd Duke of Norfolk, leads an English expedition into France and burns the port city of Brest.
- May 26 – Selim I succeeds Bayezid II, as Sultan of the Ottoman Empire.
- June 15 – Al-Ashraf Qansuh al-Ghuri, ruler of the Mamluk Sultanate that controls Egypt and what is now Egypt, Israel, Lebanon and parts of Syria, receives an envoy from King George II of Kakheti (now located in the Republic of Georgia) and decides to reopen the Church of the Holy Sepulchre in Jerusalem.
- June 16 – Massimiliano Sforza is installed as the new Duke of Milan by the Holy League, to force out King Louis XII of France.
- June 24 – Captain-Major Simão de Miranda de Azevedo took office as the new Portuguese Governor of Mozambique after being replaced by King Manuel I to replace António de Saldanha.
- June 29 – Giano II di Campofregoso was elected as the Doge of the Republic of Genoa in Italy after the withdrawal of French occupation troops, filling a vacancy that had existed since 1507.

==== July–September ====
- July 10 – King Ferdinand II of Aragon sends Don Fadrique de Toledo, to complete the Spanish conquest of Iberian Navarre.
- July 12 – The Treaty of Blois is signed in France between representatives of the Spanish Kingdom of Navarre and of the Kingdom of France guaranteeing French intervention to keep Navarre neutral and to prevent an attack by the "Holy League" alliance of Pope Julius II and Spain's King Ferdinand II of Aragon and Castile.
- July 23 – Sten Sture the Younger is elected new Regent of Sweden, replacing Eric Trolle.
- August 10 – War of the League of Cambrai – Battle of Saint-Mathieu: The English navy defeats the French-Breton fleet. Both navies use ships firing cannons through ports, and each loses its principal ship — Regent and Marie-la-Cordelière — through a large explosion aboard the latter.
- September 1 – After being dispatched by Pope Julius II with command of a Spanish Army, General Giovanni di Lorenzo de' Medici recaptures the city of Florence (Firenze), capital of the Florentine Republic in Italy and ousts Piero Soderini as the ruling Gonfaloniere. The success at Florence spares the city of Rome from a French invasion. Within a year, Medici becomes leader of the Roman Catholic Church and the Papal States as Pope Leo X.
- September 10 – Portuguese Admiral Afonso de Albuquerque departs from the Indian city of Cochin with 14 ships and 1,700 troops to retake the fortress of Goa, capital of Portuguese India, from Bijapur's General Rasul Khan. A day before a planned Portuguese attack on Bihar's army, Rasul Khan and his occupying forces depart from Goa.

==== October–December ====
- October 19 – Martin Luther becomes a doctor of theology (Doctor in Biblia).
- October 21 – Martin Luther joins the theological faculty of the University of Wittenberg.
- November 1 – The ceiling of the Sistine Chapel, painted by Michelangelo Buonarroti, is exhibited to the public for the first time.
- December 27 – The Spanish Crown issues the Laws of Burgos, governing the conduct of settlers with regard to native Indians in the New World.

==== Date unknown ====
- António de Abreu discovers Timor Island, and reaches the Banda Islands, Ambon Island and Seram.
- Francisco Serrão reaches the Moluccas.
- Francisco Serrao and other shipwreck sailors with permission from the Ternate Sultanate build Fort Tolukko. It is one of the earliest, if not the first European style fortress in southeast Asia.
- Juan Ponce de León discovers the Turks and Caicos Islands.
- Pedro Mascarenhas discovers Diego Garcia, and reaches Mauritius in the Mascarene Islands.
- Moldavia becomes a vassal of the Ottoman Empire, on the same conditions as Wallachia: the voivode will be designated by the Turks, but will be Eastern Orthodox Christians. Also, the Turks are not allowed to build mosques, to be buried, to own land or to settle in the country.
- The Florentine Republic begins to be dismantled, and the Medici Family comes back into power.
- The word masque is first used to denote a poetic drama.
- Nicolaus Copernicus begins to write Commentariolus, an abstract of what will eventually become his heliocentric astronomy De revolutionibus orbium coelestium; he sends it to other scientists interested in the matter by 1514.

=== 1513 ===
==== January–March ====
- January 20 – Spanish conquistador Vasco Núñez de Balboa writes a letter to King Ferdinand II of Aragon advocating genocide against the native peoples of on the Caribbean islands, and begins the killing of hundreds of residents of Caribbean villages.
- February 18 – In a papal bull three days before his death, Pope Julius II declares Queen Catherine of Navarre and King John II of Aragon to be heretics for their refusal to participate with other Roman Catholic nations in the War of the League of Cambrai.
- February 20 – King Hans of Denmark dies at the age of 58 from injuries sustained in being thrown from a horse. He is succeeded by his 32-year-old son Christian II as ruler of Denmark and Norway.
- February 21 – Pope Julius II dies three days after issuing his final papal bull.
- March 4 – The conclave of the Roman Catholic Cardinals begins at the Niccoline Chapel in the Apostolic Palace in Rome, with 25 of the 31 Cardinals participating. In the first round of balloting, none of the Cardinals receives the required 17 votes necessary for a three-fourth's majority, though Cardinal Jaime Serra I Cau of Spain, Bishop of Albano, receives 13.
- March 9 – Cardinal Giovanni di Lorenzo de' Medici, the Apostolic Administrator of Amalfi but not ordained as a priest, is selected to succeed the late Pope Julius II, as the 217th Pope of the Roman Catholic Church. After two days, the selection is announced to the public and Medici, takes the name of Pope Leo X , despite a strong challenge by Italian cardinal Raffaele Riario and his group of seniors, or cardinals that were elected by Sixtus IV and Innocent VIII, who were opposed to the relatively newer juniors that included Medici.
- March 15 – In the Taino Rebellion on the island of Puerto Rico, Spanish conquistador Diego Guilarte de Salazar attacks the Taino towns of Yauco and Coxiguex.
- March 26 – On Easter Sunday, Afonso de Albuquerque, Governor of Portuguese India, makes an unsuccessful attempt to capture the port city of Aden, on the Arabian Peninsula, from the Mamluk Sultanate, using 20 ships and 2,500 soldiers. The 1,700 Portuguese, along with 800 mercenaries from Malabar, lose at least 100 killed during the attack and retreat.
- March 27 – Juan Ponce de León becomes the first European definitely known to sight Florida, mistaking it for another island.

==== April–June ====
- April 2
  - Juan Ponce de León and his expedition become the first Europeans known to visit Florida, landing somewhere on the east coast.
  - Juan Garrido (as part of Juan Ponce de León's expedition) becomes the first African known to visit North America, landing somewhere on the east coast of Florida.
- May 25 – Giano II di Campofregoso resigns as Doge of the Republic of Genoa as plots by two opposing families restore the influence of France. Campogregoso leaves the city on a ship to serve the Republic of Venice in its war against the Duchy of Milan.
- May – Portuguese explorer Jorge Álvares and his crew land on Lintin Island, in the Pearl River estuary, near Guangzhou, becoming the first Europeans to arrive in China.
- June 6 – Italian Wars – Battle of Novara: Swiss mercenaries defeat the French under Louis II de la Trémoille, forcing the French to abandon Milan and Italy.
- June 20 – Ottaviano Fregoso becomes the new Doge of the Republic of Genoa, replacing Giano II di Campofregoso.
- June 28 – Pope Leo X sends a letter to Scotland's King James IV, threatening him with ecclesiastical censure or excommunication for breaking his peace treaties with England.

==== July–September ====
- July 22 – Christian II becomes King of Denmark and Norway.
- July 25 – Scotland's Earl of Arran departs from the Firth of Forth with 22 ships on a plan to join France in cutting off England's communications with the rest of Europe.
- August 16
  - Battle of Dubica (part of the Hundred Years' Croatian–Ottoman War): Croatian troops under Petar Berislavić, Ban (Viceroy) of Croatia, defeat an Ottoman army under Sanjak-bey Junuz-aga
  - Battle of the Spurs (or Battle of Guinegate, part of the War of the League of Cambrai): English and allied troops under Henry VIII defeat French cavalry under Marshal La Palice.
- August 5 – A force of 7,000 Scottish border troops, commanded by Lord Home, invades England and begins the destruction and pillaging of villages in Northumberland.
- August 23 – Thérouanne is given to Henry VIII of England after a treaty is concluded in the aftermath of the Battle of the Spurs.
- September 9
  - Battle of Flodden: King James IV of Scotland is defeated and killed by an English army under Thomas Howard, Earl of Surrey. James's son, the Duke of Rothesay, becomes James V, King of Scots. At least 5,000 Scots and 1,500 English troops are killed.
  - Johann Reuchlin is summoned for an inquisition trial, which was initiated by Jacob van Hoogstraaten. The verdict of the trial was never revealed, as when it was going to be announced on October 12, the archbishop of Mainz ordered the court to go into recess on threat of resigning the court, and the trial never went on. Eventually, in March 1514, an ecclesiastical court presided over by George, Bishop of Speyer cleared Reuchlin of any charges and ordered Hoogstraten to pay the cost of 111 guldens, although this was overturned by Leo X in a papal decision in 1520.
- September 19 – Upon confirming that King James IV of Scotland was killed in battle, the 35 Lords of Council of the Realm meet at Stirling Castle and agree to rule Scotland in the name of James's widow, Margaret Tudor, and his son, the infant James V.
- September 25 – Vasco Núñez de Balboa, first sees what will become known as the Pacific Ocean from the Isthimus of Darién. This moment is later referenced in a poem by John Keats called "On First Looking into Chapman's Homer" with the line "silent upon a peak in Darién" although he mistakenly references Hernán Cortés as the one who saw the Pacific from Darién.
- September 30 – A major rock avalanche occurs in the Southern side of the Swiss Alps at Monte Crenone, which destroys the village of Biasca, floods Bellinzona, and formed a lake of 390 m.a.s.l.
- September – The dispute between Johann Reuchlin and Johannes Pfefferkorn concerning the Talmud and other Jewish books, is referred to Pope Leo X.

==== October–December ====
- October 7 – Battle of La Motta (War of the League of Cambrai): Spanish troops under Ramón de Cardona decisively defeat those of the Republic of Venice under Bartolomeo d'Alviano in Schio.
- October 21 – The coronation of James V, 17 months old, as King of Scotland takes place in the Chapel Royal at Stirling Castle.
- November 5 – Pope Leo X issues the decree Dum suavissimos, reviving Sapienza University of Rome.
- November – Gazapati, becomes the new King of Burma at as his father, King Raza I, abdicates the throne at the capital of Arakan, Mrauk U.
- December 17 –
  - The Canton of Appenzell becomes a member of the Swiss Confederacy.
  - Louis XII of France makes peace with the Papal States by having is decree disavowing the Council of Pisa and his future adherence to the Lateran Council.
- December – He attempts to make peace with Spain by offering King Ferdinand his daughter Renée to one of his grandsons along with renouncing his claims on Naples. The proposal is never accepted.

==== Undated ====
- Niccolò Machiavelli is suspected of trying to overthrow the House of Medici and is arrested and tortured. He is soon after released and he moves to his farm in San Casciano, and he writes The Prince.
- Leo Africanus visits Timbuktu, second city of the Songhai Empire.
- Paracelsus begins studying at Ferrara University.

=== 1514 ===
==== January–March ====
- January 10 – A great fire breaks out, in the Rialto of Venice.
- February 12 – War of the League of Cambrai: In what is now the Italian region of Friuli-Venezia Giulia, Giacomo Badoer, administrator of the Republic of Venice, orders a retreat from the approaching forces of the Holy Roman Empire, abandoning Udine, Cividale and Cormons and falling back on Sacile.
- March 12 – A huge exotic embassy sent by King Manuel I of Portugal to Pope Leo X arrives in Rome, including Hanno, an Indian elephant.
- March 13 – Louis XII of France makes peace with Maximilian I, Holy Roman Emperor.

==== April–June ====
- April 29 – After a month of negotiations at Linz between the Holy Roman Empire and the Kingdom of Denmark, representatives of the two nations sign an alliance agreement, to be secured by the marriage of the Emperor's 13-year-old daughter Isabella, to the new King of Denmark, Christian II, along with payment of a dowry to King Christian of 250,000 Rhenish gulden, equivalent to $118,000,000 USD 500 years later.
- May 2 – The Poor Conrad peasant revolt against Ulrich, Duke of Württemberg begins in Beutelsbach.
- May 15 – The earliest printed edition of Saxo Grammaticus' 12th century Scandinavian history Gesta Danorum, edited by Christiern Pedersen from an original found near Lund, is published as Danorum Regum heroumque Historiae, by Jodocus Badius in Paris.
- June 13 – Henry Grace à Dieu, at over 1,000 tons the largest warship in the world at this time, built at the new Woolwich Dockyard in England, is dedicated.

==== July–September ====
- July 14 – The Hungarian rebel leader György Dózsa is defeated in battle at Temesvár in Transylvania in Hungary (now Timișoara in Romania, and tortured over a period of six days until his death. Condemning Dózsa's ambition to be king, Hungary's monarch Stephen VIII Báthory orders that Dózsa be tied to an iron throne over a fire, then forced to wear a red-hot metal crown.
- July 20 – King Christian II is crowned King of Norway in Oslo. This coronation will be the last in Norway for 304 years until the crowning of King Karl XIV Johan in 1818.
- August 7 – King Henry VIII of England concludes an independent peace treaty with France in the War of the League of Cambrai, negotiated by Thomas Wolsey.
- August 13 – Mary Tudor, sister of King Henry VIII, is married by proxy to France's King Louis XII in accordane with the August 7 peace treaty.
- August 23 – Battle of Chaldiran: Selim I crushes the Persian army of Shah Ismail I.
- September 7 – The Ottoman Army, commanded by the Sultan Selim I, arrives at Tabriz, capital of Safavid Iran and accepts the surrender of Shah Ismail.
- September 8 – Forces of the Grand Duchy of Lithuania and the Kingdom of Poland, backed by Belarusians, with 30,000 troops, defeat the larger Russian army of the Grand Duchy of Moscow (80,000 soldiers) in the Battle of Orsha.
- September 15 – Thomas Wolsey is appointed Archbishop of York in England.

==== October–December ====
- October 9 – King Louis XII of France marries Mary Tudor (sister of King Henry VIII of England) at Abbeville, as part of the Kingdom of England's peace with France.
- November 5 – Mary Tudor is formally crowned as the Queen consort of France.
- November 23 – King Henry VIII of summons the English Parliament, to assemble at Westminster on February 5.
- November 28 – Hersekzade Ahmed Pasha steps down as Grand vizier of the Ottoman Empire.
- December 4 – Juan Rodríguez de Fonseca and Pietro Martire d'Anghiera complete the first printed map of Central America as they record their data from the Pinzón–Solís voyage of 1508-1509.
- December 18 – Ottoman General Dukaginzade Ahmed Pasha is appointed by the Sultan Selmi I as the new Grand Vizier, but serves for less than three months before he is removed and executed.
- December 29 – Giovanni Carlo Tramontano, Count of Matera, is assassinated in Matera, the day after demanding that the aristocracy and people of his realm pay 24,000 ducates in taxes to clear up his personal debts.

==== Date unknown ====
- Albrecht Dürer makes his famous engraving Melencolia I.
- Paolo Ricci (Camillo Renato) moves to Augsburg.
- Nicolaus Copernicus's Commentariolus, outlining his theory of heliocentrism, is written by this date.

=== 1515 ===
==== January–March ====
- January 1 – King Louis XII of France dies of severe gout after a reign of 14 years, and his son-in-law, François, inherits the throne.
- January 25 – François, is crowned King of France in the Cathedral of Reims, with his wife Claude, daughter of the late King Louis XII, crowned as Queen consort.
- January - In Vietnam, an uprising led by Phùng Chương broke out in Tam Đảo and was quickly quelled by general Trịnh Duy Sản under emperor Lê Tương Dực of the Lê dynasty.
- February 8 – King Henry VIII of England opens the English Parliament. Henry's chief advisor, Sir Thomas Nevill, is elected Speaker of the House of Commons
- February 11 – George of Kratovo, a silversmith in Serbia, becomes a martyr to the Christian faith as he is burned to death on a pyre for refusing to convert to Islam.
- March 3 – Mary Tudor, sister of King Henry VIII of England and widow of King Louis XII of France, is secretly married to the Duke of Suffolk in the presence of the new King of France, Francois.
- March 4 – Dukaginzade Ahmed Pasha, who was appointed as Grand Vizier of the Ottoman Empire less than three months earlier, is executed by order of the Sultan Selim I, and is replaced by his predecessor, Hersekzade Ahmed Pasha.
- March 12 – In Italy, Costanzo II Sforza, Lord of Pesaro, is mortally wounded by a gunshot from an arquebus rifle while traveling with Maximilian Sforza, Duke of Milan. He dies a little more than a month later, on April 14.
- March 31 –
  - Pope Leo X issues a papal bull, at the suggestion of the German cardinal Albert of Brandenburg, providing for a special indulgence on worshipers in four Roman Catholic dioceses in order to pay for construction of St. Peter's Basilica in Rome, with half to be paid to Albert for services.
  - Multiple acts of the English parliament are given royal assent by King Henryv VIII, including the Deepening River at Canterbury Act 1514, the Thames Watermen Act 1514, and the Felons and Murderers Act 1514.

==== April–June ====
- April 1 – The Portuguese Navy, led by Afonso de Albuquerque, conquers the strategic Hormuz Island as King Turan Shah and his prime minister, Rais Nureddin invited Albuquerque to land his forces and formally take possession of Hormuz.
- April 15 – The Emirate of Oman, ruled by Muhammad bin Ismail, becomes a protectorate of Portugal.
- April 17 – Mehmed I Giray becomes the new ruler of the Tatar Crimean Khanate (in what is now Russian-occupied Ukraine) upon the death of his father, Meñli I Giray.
- April 23 – In Portuguese-occupied Morocco, the Governor of Safi, Nuno Fernandes de Ataíde, conducts an unsuccessful attack on Marrakesh, and is forced to retreat by defenders led by the Emir Nasr ibn Chentaf al-Hintati.
- May 13 – Mary Tudor, Queen of France, and Charles Brandon, 1st Duke of Suffolk, are officially married at Greenwich (near London).
- May 20 – "Ulysses", the first known rhinoceros in Europe, arrives at Lisbon in Portugal after being brought by ship from India.
- June 13 – Battle of Turnadag: The army of Ottoman sultan Selim I defeats the beylik of Dulkadir under Bozkurt of Dulkadir.

==== July–September ====
- July 2 – Manchester Grammar School is endowed by Hugh Oldham, the first free grammar school in England.
- July 22 – At the First Congress of Vienna, a double wedding takes place to cement agreements. Louis, only son of King Vladislaus II of Hungary, marries Mary of Austria, granddaughter of Maximilian I, Holy Roman Emperor; and Mary's brother, Archduke Ferdinand, marries Vladislaus' daughter, Anna.
- August 12 – Isabella of Austria is crowned as Queen consort of Denmark and Norway after her marriage to King Christian II is ratified.
- August 25 – Conquistador Diego Velázquez de Cuéllar founds Havana, Cuba.
- September 8– Lopo Soares de Albergaria becomes the new Viceroy of Portuguese India as Afonso de Albuquerque resigns because of health problems.
- September 14– The Battle of Marignano concludes after two days as the army of Francis I of France defeats the Swiss mercenaries, thanks to the timely arrival of a Venetian army. The French Army enters the Duchy of Milan on September 17 and reclaims it for King Francis.

==== October–December ====
- October 2 – In India, Suja Rathore of Marwar dies after ruling Marawar for 23 years, and two of his grandsons, Biram Singh Rathore and Rao Ganga, compete for the throne.
- October 4 – Maximilian Sforza, Duke of Milan, surrenders to the French forces and is imprisoned until the arrival of King Francis.
- October 8 – Portuguese explorer Juan Díaz de Solís departs from Sanlúcar de Barrameda in Spain with three ships and 70 men on a disastrous expedition toward the southern part of the continent of South America. Soon after landing at what is now Uruguay, Díaz and most of his crew are killed by the Charrúa people shortly after their arrival in January.
- October 11 – King Francis enters the city of Milan with Charles III, Duke of Savoy and William IX, Marquis of Montferrat. Francis becomes Duke of Milan and sends Duke Maximilian into exile in France, providing hm with an annual annuity of 35,000 écus.
- November 8 – At Jodhpur, Rao Ganga became the new ruler of the Kingdom of Marwar in what is now the Indian state of Rajasthan, after the Rathore nobility determine that he is better suited to rule than his older brother Rao Viramde or his cousin Biram Singh.
- November 15 – Thomas Wolsey is invested as a Roman Catholic Cardinal.
- December 18 – King Francis I of France, victorious in the battle of Marignano in Italy and the new ruler of Milan, begins four days of meetings in Bologna with Pope Leo X. King Francis agrees to ensure the Pope's authority over the Catholic Church in France, and Leo promises to support Francis' claim to the throne of Naples.
- December 24 – Thomas Wolsey is named Lord Chancellor of England.
- December 22 – The 3rd English Parliament of King Henry VIII closes with the King giving royal assent to the Avowries Act, the Kynges Revenues Act, the "Acte for the Staple of Calice" and "the Act avoiding pulling down of Towns".

==== Date unknown ====
- Cardinal Wolsey orders construction to begin on what is to become Henry VIII's future summer residence Hampton Court Palace.
- Bartolomé de las Casas urges Ferdinand II of Aragon to end Amerindian slavery, and recommends experimental free towns.
- The Portuguese are the first Europeans to land in Timor island, as the first settlers arrive to the north coast of Madeira Island, there establishing Saint George.
- Dürer's Rhinoceros is cut.
- The Ottomans conquer the last beyliks of Anatolia, the Beylik of Dulkadir and the Ramadanid Emirate.
- Henry Cornelius Agrippa returns to Northern Italy.

=== 1516 ===
==== January–March ====
- January 20 – Juan Díaz de Solís arrives in what is now Punta del Este in Uruguay, where he becomes the first European to sail into the Río de la Plata (in future Argentina). Díaz and nine of his men are attacked and killed by the local Charrúa people shortly after their arrival. although there was likely an expedition earlier in 1511-1512 by João de Lisboa and Estevão de Fróis.
- January 23 – With the death of Ferdinand II of Aragon, his grandson, Charles of Ghent, becomes King of Spain; his mother Queen Joanna of Castile also succeeds as Queen of Aragon and co-monarch with Carlos, but remains confined at Tordesillas.
- February 18 – After two months in Bologna, part of the Papal States in Italy, Pope Leo X concludes two months of negotiation with King François I of France. Their talks result in the abrogation of the French Pragmatic Sanction, and the conclusion of a new Concordat between the Papacy and France.
- February 21 – Sir Edward Poynings becomes England's ambassador to Spain a second time and meets with King Carlos I to negotiate a treaty.
- February 25 – In his capacity as Lord of Ireland, Henry VIII opens the first of six assemblies of parliament during his reign of the Parliament of Ireland at Dublin. The parliament holds three sessions, ending on October 2, when it is dismissed.
- March 1 – Desiderius Erasmus publishes a new Greek edition of the New Testament, Novum Instrumentum omne, in Basel.
- March 13 – At the age of 9, Louis II of Jagiellon becomes the new King of Hungary, Croatia and Bohemia upon the death of his father, King Vladislaus II.
- March 29 – The Venetian Ghetto is instituted in the Republic of Venice.

==== April–June ====
- April 19 – England, represented by Ambassador Poynings and Spain's King Carlos I conclude a treaty of alliance.
- April 23 – The Reinheitsgebot is instituted in Ingolstadt, Bavaria, regulating the purity of beer permissible for sale.
- May 6 – A Category IX earthquake strikes Dubrovnik in what is now Croatia.
- May 8 – In what is now Vietnam, Le Tuong Duc, Emperor of Dai Viet, since 1509, is murdered at his palace at Thang Long (now in Hanoi) by his bodyguards. Le Tuong Duc's 12-year-old nephew, Le Chieu Tong, is installed as the new Emperor by the conspirators.
- June 14 – In Spain, King John III of Navarre dies after a reign of 32 years and is succeeded by his widow, Queen Catherine.

==== July–September ====
- July 4 – King James V of Scotland opens the Scottish Parliament at Edinburgh.
- July 28 – Selim I of the Ottoman Empire captures the city of Malatya (located in what is now southeastern Turkey) as the first conquest in his war against the Mamluk Sultanate of Egypt and then proceeds to invade Syria.
- July 30 – John V, Count of Nassau-Siegen dies in Siegen, now in Germany, leaving his realm to be divided by his two sons. The transition is smooth because of a 1509 agreement between Henry III of Nassau-Breda and William I of Nassau-Dillenburg. William receives all of John V's possessions in Germany, while Henry inherits those in the Low Countries.
- August 13 – The Treaty of Noyon is signed. King François I of France recognizes Charles I of Spain's claim to Naples, and Charles recognizes Francis's claim to Milan. The treaty also promised Louise of France to Charles.
- August 18 – King Francis I of France and Pope Leo X sign the Concordat of Bologna, agreeing on the relationship between church and state in France.
- August 24 – Ottoman–Mamluk War (1516–17): The Ottoman Sultan Selim I defeats the Mamluk forces commanded by the sultan Al-Ashraf Qansuh al-Ghuri in the Battle of Marj Dabiq, bringing all of the Middle East. The Mamluk Sultan, Al-Ashraf Qansuh al-Ghuri, is killed while leading his troops in the battle, and Prime Minister Al-Ashraf Tuman Bay, who was left in charge in Cairo by the Sultan Qansuh, becomes the Sultan of Egypt, the last remaining part of the Mamluk Sultanate.
- September 16 – German theologian Andreas Karlstadt completes his series of 151 theses, an attack against corruption in the Roman Catholic Church.
- September 17 – Baased in Kamaran, an island in the Red Sea, the Mamluk Egyptian Admiral Selman Reis leads of fleet 19 ships in an unsuccessful attempt to take Yemen and Aden.

==== October–December ====
- October 28 – Ottoman–Mamluk War (1516–17): Ottoman forces under the Grand Vizier Sinan Pasha defeat the Mamluks in the Battle of Yaunis Khan near Gaza.
- November 29 – The "Treaty of Perpetual Peace" is signed in the city of Fribourg in Switzerland, between representatives of the Thirteen Cantons of the Old Swiss Confederacy, and King Francis of the Kingdom of France, confirming the French victory in the 1515 Battle of Marignano. The Swiss Confederacy renounces all claims to the French protectorate of Milan in Italy, in for 700,000 gold crowns in compensation.
- December 4 – Treaty of Brussels: Peace is declared between the Kingdom of France and the Holy Roman Empire.
- c. December – Thomas More's most famous work, Utopia, completed this year, is published in Leuven (in Latin).

==== Date unknown ====
- Italian explorer Rafael Perestrello, a cousin of the wife of Christopher Columbus, commands an expedition from Portuguese Malacca to land on the shores of mainland southern China, and trade with Chinese merchants at Guangzhou, during the Ming Dynasty.
- Portuguese soldier Fernão Lopes becomes the first known permanent inhabitant of Saint Helena.
- Leonardo da Vinci accepts Francis I's invitation to France.
- The predecessor of the Royal Mail, known as the Master of the Posts, is established by Henry VIII of England.
- Gillingham School is founded, the oldest in Dorset, England.
- Fuggerei is established in Augsburg (Bavaria), as the world's oldest social housing complex still in use.
- The fall of the Nantan meteorite is possibly observed near the city of Nantan, Nandan County, Guangxi (China).

=== 1517 ===
==== January–March ====
- January 22 – Battle of Ridaniya: The Holy Ottoman army of the sultan Selim I defeats the Mamluk army in Egypt, commanded by the king Tuman Bay II.
- January 30 – Cairo is captured by the Ottoman Empire after a three day battle, and the Mamluk Sultanate falls. The Abbasid Caliphate, reestablished in 1261, falls to the Ottomans and the last Caliph, Al-Mutawakkil III, is deported along with his family to Constantinople.

=== 1518 ===
==== January–March ====
- January 25 – Piri Mehmed Pasha is appointed as the new Grand Vizier of the Ottoman Empire by the Sultan Selim I, replacing Yunus Pasha, who was executed four months earlier on September 13.
- January 27 – Sir John Ernley is selected as the new Chief Justice of the Common Pleas of England by King King Henry VIII to replace the late Robert Rede, who died on January 8. Emley. He is replaced as Attorney General for England and Wales by John FitzJames.
- February 2 – In Valladolid in Spain, Frenchman Jean Sauvage, Chancellor of Burgundy is appointed by Spain's Prince Charles as the Chief Judge of the Cortes of Valladolid. The choice of a foreigner is resented by the members of the court and Sauvage is replaced at the Cortes by the Spanish Bishop Pedro Ruiz de la Mota.
- March 5 – The Dutch priest Erasmus of Rotterdam sends the new Ninety-five Theses of Martin Luther to England, delivering the Protestant manifesto to Sir Thomas More.
- March 22 – King Charles of Spain gives his approval for the Magellan expedition, initially for the purpose of finding a westward route from Spain to the "Spice Islands" (now the Maluku Islands in Indonesia), to avoid the more frequently-used eastward route around Africa. Veteran seaman Ferdinand Magellan and navigator Rui Faleiro, both of Portugal, had turned to Spain to fund the expedition after being refused by King Manuel of Portugal. The voyage proves to be further than expected and becomes the first to sail around the world.

==== April–June ====
- April 8 – Spanish conquistador Juan de Grijalva embarks from Cuba on a mission to explore and conquer Mexico, departing from Matanzas with four ships and 170 people.
- April 18 – The widowed Sigismund I the Old, King of Poland and Grand Duke of Lithuania, marries Milanese noblewoman Bona Sforza in Wawel Cathedral and she is crowned as Queen consort of Poland.
- April 26 – Martin Luther makes the first public defense of his views at a gathering of the Roman Catholic order of Augustinians, at what becomes known as the Heidelberg Disputation at a lecture hall at Heidelberg in the Electoral Palatinate in Germany. While there, he is challenged to a theological debate by Johann Eck, the German leader of the anti-Reformation movement.
- May 3 – Girjalva and his crew become the first Europeans to find Cozumel in Mexico.
- May 9 – A fleet of four Portuguese ships, commanded by João da Silveira from Portuguese India, arrived in Chittagong (now part of Bangladesh, but at the time part of the Sultanate of Bengal), reputed to be the wealthiest region in the Indian subcontinent.
- May 19 – In Venice, Renaissance artist Tiziano Vecellio, known as "Titian", unveils his painting Assumption of the Virgin, to the public.
- May 26 – A transit of Venus occurs, but a transit will not be observed or recorded until 120 years later, on December 4, 1639.
- May 30 – At the request of Pope Leo X of the Roman Catholic Church, Martin Luther, father of the Protestant Reformation, writes a lengthy summary of his theology.
- June 8 – The Girjalva expedition brings the first Europeans to the Yucatan Peninsula in Mexico, arriving at what is now the Tabasco state.

==== July–September ====
- July 14 – Dancing plague of 1518: A case of dancing mania breaks out in Strasbourg as a woman identified as "Frau Troffea" begins constant dancing that lasts for six days, after which fellow residents begin to join in. According to some historians, several people die from constant dancing.
- July 27 – Battle of Brännkyrka: The Kalmar Union, led by King Christian II of Denmark, is defeated by the Swedish regent Sten Sture the Younger.
- August 10 – Construction of the Manchester Grammar School is completed in England. The total cost of the project was £218 13s 5d.
- August 28 – King Charles of Spain issues a charter authorizing the transportation of slaves directly from Africa to the Spanish Americas. His decision changes the nature and scale of the transatlantic slave trade.
- September 8 – Diogo Lopes de Sequeira takes office as the new Governor of Portuguese India, replacing Lopo Soares de Albergaria.

==== October–December ====
- October 3 – The Treaty of London temporarily ensures peace in Western Europe.
- November 13 – Diego Velázquez de Cuéllar, the Spanish Colonial Governor of Cuba, is granted the office of Captain General of Yucatán, which comprises southern Mexico. Velázquez is also granted the exclusive right to conquer and colonize the new Yucatan Province, but turns the rights over to Francisco de Montejo in 1526.
- December 7 – The Deccan sultanates in southern India of Ahmadnagar, Berar, Bidar, Bijapur, and Golconda formally declare their independence from the Bahmani Sultanate.

==== Date unknown ====
- The Rajput Mewar Kingdom under Rana Sanga achieves a major victory over Sultan Ibrahim Lodi of Delhi.
- A swarm of stinging ants devastates crops on Hispaniola.
- Johann Froben publishes Erasmus's work Colloquies, which was unauthorized, and it took until 1519 that an authorized version would be published.
- Henricus Grammateus publishes Ayn neu Kunstlich Buech in Vienna, containing the earliest printed use of plus and minus signs for arithmetic.
- The remnants of The Abbasid Caliphate (stationed in Egypt under the Mamluk Sultanate (Cairo) hands over the title of caliph to the Ottoman Empire that had conquered Constantinople in 1453, 65 years earlier

=== 1519 ===
==== January–March ====
- January 1 – Ulrich Zwingli preaches for the first time, as people's priest of the Great Minister in Zurich.
- January 12 – Maximilian I, Holy Roman Emperor, dies at the age of 59 after a reign of slightly less than 11 years. An imperial election by the leaders of the various member states of the Empire is scheduled for June 28.
- February 10 – The Spanish conquistador Hernán Cortés and his conquistadores depart from Cuba toward the island of Cozumel in Mexico to begin a mission of conquest.
- February 18 – Because of the large population of Jews included converts to Christianity ("New Christians") in the colony of Portuguese India at Goa, King Manuel I of Portugal announces that there will be no further appointment of New Christians to government offices, but affirms that those already in office are not to be dismissed
- March 4 – Hernán Cortés and his conquistadores land in Mexico.

==== April–June ====
- April 21 (Maundy Thursday) – Hernán Cortés reaches San Juan de Ulúa, and sets foot the next day (Good Friday) on the beach of modern-day Veracruz.
- May 4 – Giulio de' Medici, who will later become Pope Clement VII becomes the Duke of the Florentine Republic upon the death of his father, Lorenzo de' Medici, Duke of Urbino.
- June 27 – The Leipzig Debate begins at the Pleissenburg lecture hall in the German city of Leipzig in Saxony, as Martin Luther defends his ideas on the Protestant Reformation against challenges by Johann Eck, the German leader of the anti-Reformation movement. While there, he is challenged to a theological debate by Johann Eck, the German leader of the anti-Reformation movement. The debate lasts until July 15 and gains new followers to Luther's theology.
- June 28 – King Carlos I of Spain is elected as the new Holy Roman Emperor and takes the regnal name of Charles V. He will reign until 1556).

==== July–September ====
- July 4 – Martin Luther joins the debate regarding papal authority, against Johann Eck at Leipzig.
- July 10 – The Prince of Ning rebellion begins, after Zhu Chenhao declares the Ming dynasty's Zhengde Emperor a usurper, and leads his army north in an attempt to capture Nanjing.
- July 26 – King Charles of Spain issues a royal order prohibiting navigator Rui Faleiro from participating in the Magellan expedition, after Portugal's ambassador to Spain reports that Faleiro is suffering from a nervous breakdown.
- August 10 – The Magellan expedition departs from Seville in Spain.
- August 15 – Panama City is founded by Spanish conquistador Pedro Arias Dávila.
- August 20 – Ming Dynasty Chinese philosopher and general Wang Yangming, governor of Jiangxi, defeats Zhu Chenhao, ending the Prince of Ning rebellion. Wang has expressed the intention of using fo–lang–ji cannons in suppressing the rebellion, probably the earliest reference in China to the breech-loading Frankish culverin.
- September 20 – Ferdinand Magellan departs from Spain with a fleet of five ships and a crew of 270 men, to sail westbound to the Spice Islands.

==== October–December ====
- October 12 – Hernán Cortés and his men, accompanied by 3,000 Tlaxcalans, enter Cholula.
- November 8 – Hernán Cortés enters Tenochtitlan, capital of the Aztec Empire, and appears at the court of Aztec ruler Moctezuma II.
- December 6 – The Magellan expedition reaches the South American coast.
- December 11 – At Toruń, the members of the Sejm of the Kingdom of Poland vote to approve a war against the Teutonic Knights and to assess new taxes to recruit mercenary troops.

==== Date unknown ====
- The first civil revolt in Anatolia takes place, led by Alevi preacher Celâl.
- The Spanish invade Barbados.
- Spanish conquistador and founder of Panama City, Gaspar de Espinosa, sails up the Pacific coast from Panama to Nicaragua, landing at the Gulf of Nicoya.
- Havana moves from the southern to the northern part of Cuba.
- A large pandemic spreads from the Greater Antilles into Central America, and perhaps as far as Peru in South America. This widespread epidemic kills off much of the indigenous populations in these areas (the first widely documented epidemic in the New World).
- Central Mexico Amerindians' population reaches 25.3 million.
- The Mexican Indian Wars begin.
- Cacao comes to Europe.
- St. Olaf's Church, Tallinn is completed in Estonia.
- The first recorded fatal accident involving a gun in England is recorded at Welton, East Riding of Yorkshire.

== Births ==
1510

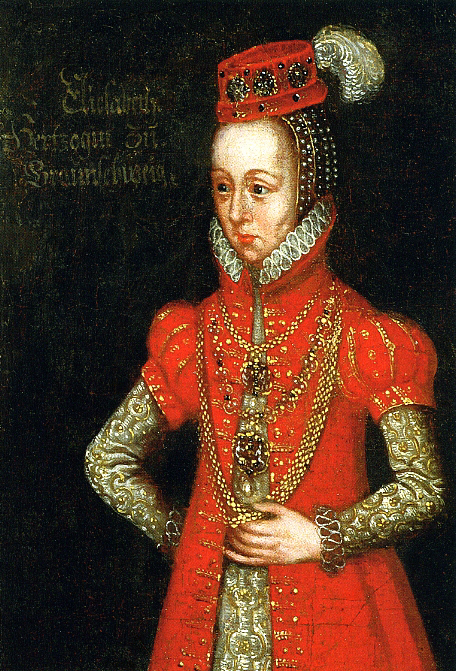
Elisabeth of Brandenburg

- February 24 – Costanzo II Sforza, Italian noble (d. 1512)
- March 25 – Guillaume Postel, French linguist (d. 1581)
- March 30 – Antonio de Cabezón, Spanish composer and organist (d. 1566)
- June 6 – Giovanni Battista Cicala, Italian Catholic cardinal (d. 1570)
- August 11 – Margaret Paleologa, Sovereign Marchioness of Montferrat (1531–1540) (d. 1566)
- August 24 – Elisabeth of Brandenburg, Duchess of Brunswick-Calenberg-Göttingen (1525–1540) (d. 1558)
- October 6
  - Rowland Taylor, English Protestant martyr (d. 1555)
  - John Caius, English physician (d. 1573)
- October 25 – Renée of France, French princess (d. 1574)
- October 28 – Francis Borgia, Spanish General of the Jesuits (d. 1572)
- December 28 – Nicholas Bacon, English politician (d. 1579)
- date unknown
  - Jörg Breu the Younger, German painter (d. 1547)
  - Ferenc Dávid, Hungarian founder of the Unitarian Church (d. 1579)
  - Solomon Luria, Polish-born Kabbalist (d. 1574)
  - Oda Nobuhide, Japanese warlord (d. 1551)
  - Bernard Palissy, French potter and writer
  - Elizabeth Lucar, English calligrapher (d. 1537)
  - Ambroise Paré, French surgeon (d. 1590)
  - Nicolas Durand de Villegaignon, French naval officer (d. 1571)
  - Pierre de Manchicourt, Flemish composer (d. 1564)
  - Gracia Mendes Nasi, Portuguese businessperson and philanthropist (d. 1569)
  - Francisco Vázquez de Coronado, Spanish conquistador (d. 1554)
- probable
  - Tullia d'Aragona, Italian poet, author and philosopher (d. 1556)
  - Aloysius Lilius, Italian inventor of the Gregorian calendar (d. 1576)
  - Luis de Morales, Spanish religious painter (d. 1586)
  - Lope de Rueda, Spanish dramatist and author (d. 1565)
  - Claudio Veggio, Italian composer

1511

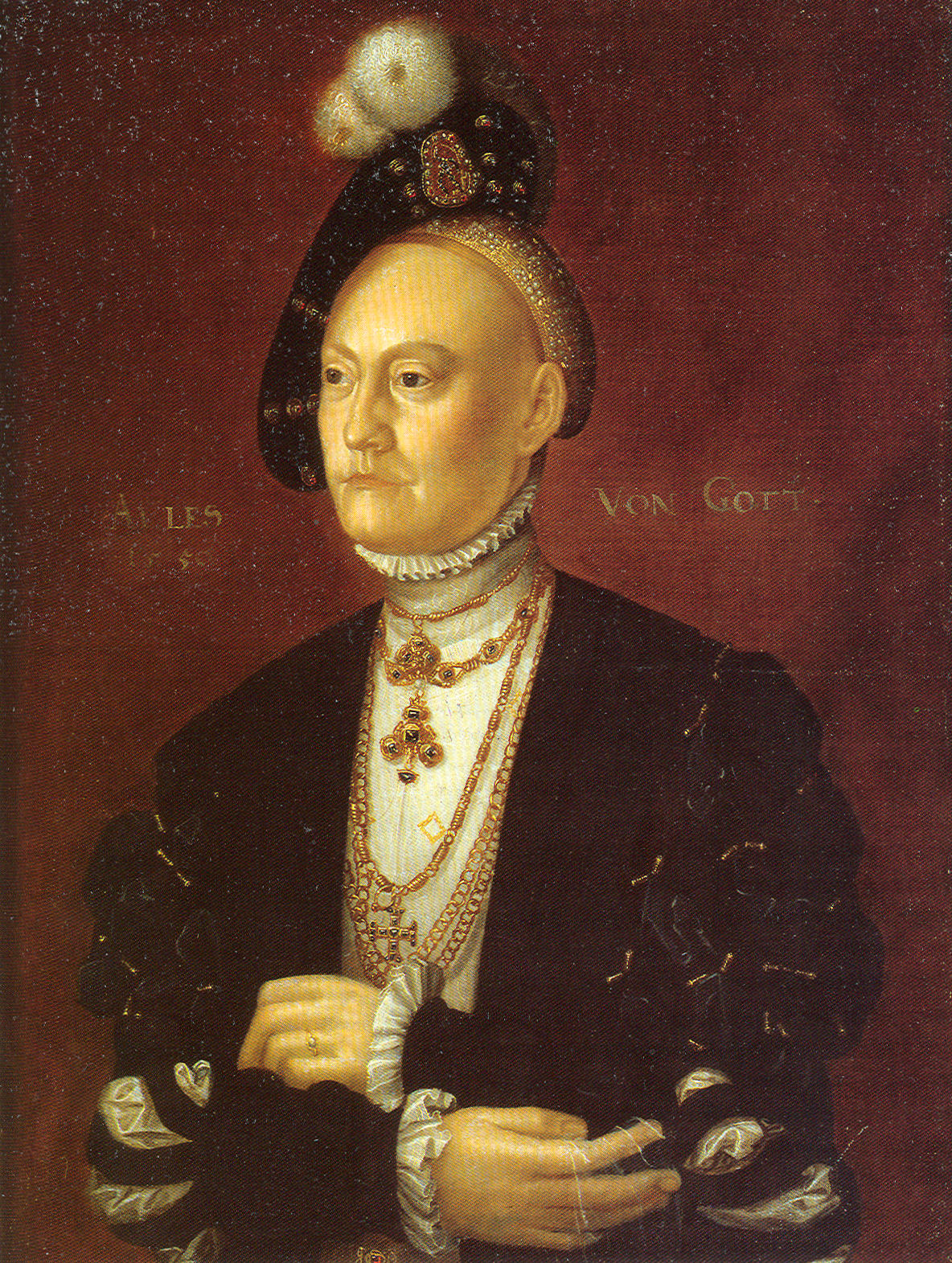
Dorothea of Saxe-Lauenburg

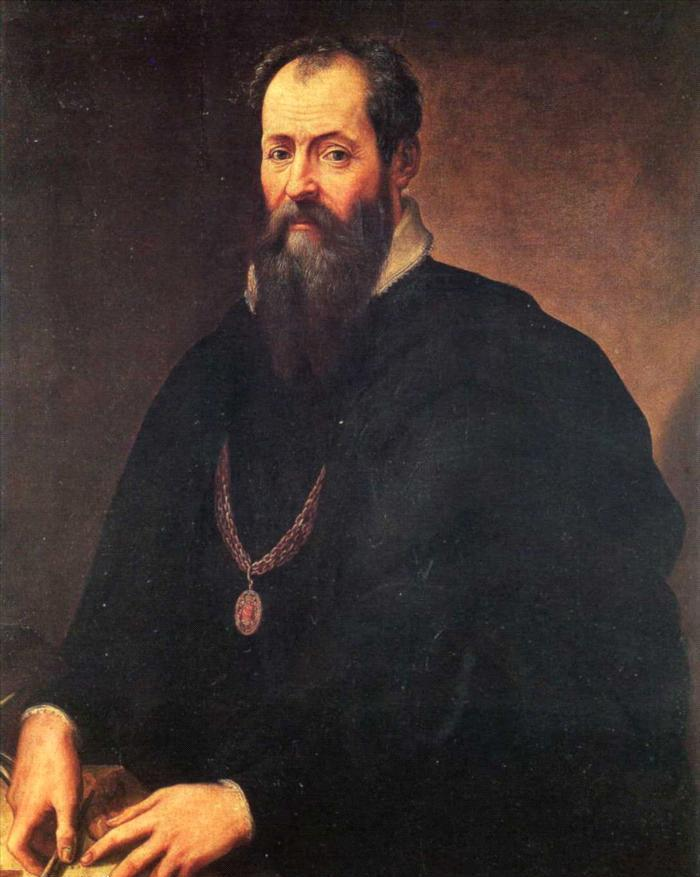
Giorgio Vasari

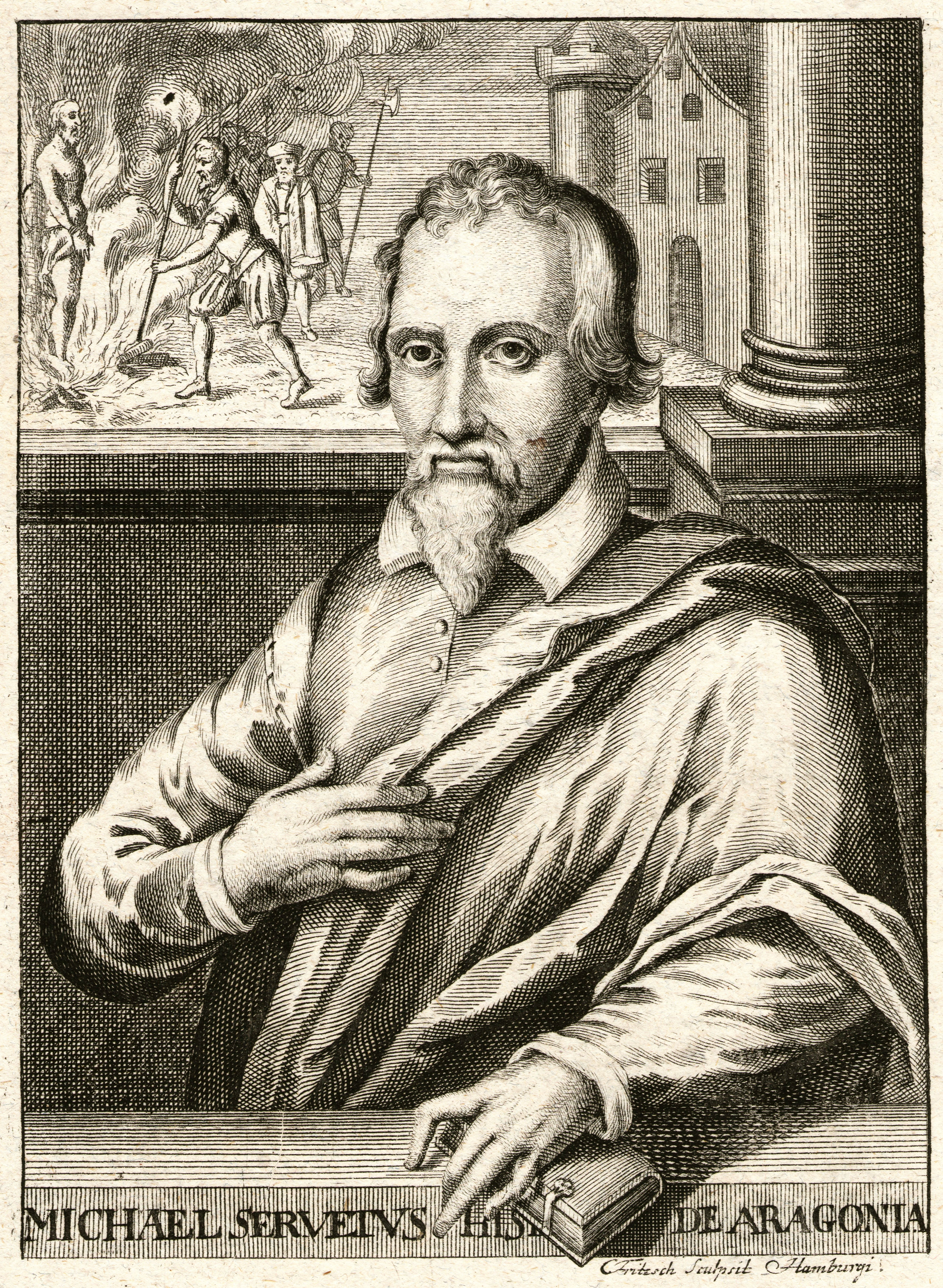
Michael Servetus

- January 1 – Henry, Duke of Cornwall, eldest son of Henry VIII of England
- April 2 – Ashikaga Yoshiharu, Japanese shōgun (d. 1550)
- April 5 – John III, Count of Nassau-Saarbrücken, German noble (d. 1574)
- June 4 – Honorat II of Savoy, French Navy admiral (d. 1580)
- June 6 – Jakob Schegk, German physician (d. 1587)
- June 18 – Bartolomeo Ammannati, Florentine architect and sculptor (d. 1592)
- July 9 – Dorothea of Saxe-Lauenburg, consort of Christian III from 1525, and Queen of Denmark and Norway (d. 1571)
- July 30 – Giorgio Vasari, Italian painter and architect (d. 1574)
- August 24 – Jean Bauhin, French physician (d. 1582)
- September 28 – Matsudaira Kiyoyasu, Japanese daimyo (d. 1535)
- September 29 – Michael Servetus, Spanish theologian (d. 1553)
- October 22 – Erasmus Reinhold, German astronomer and mathematician (d. 1553)
- November 8 – Paul Eber, German Lutheran theologian (d. 1569)
- November 15 – Johannes Secundus, Dutch poet (d. 1536)
- December 5 – Maldev Rathore, ruler of Marwar (d. 1562)
- date unknown
  - Amato Lusitano, Portuguese Jewish physician (d. 1568)
  - Birgitte Gøye, Danish county administrator, lady in waiting, landholder and educator (d. 1574)
  - Kimotsuki Kanetsugu, Japanese samurai and warlord (d. 1566)
  - Luís de Velasco, Spanish viceroy of New Spain (d. 1564)
  - Nicola Vicentino, Italian music theorist and composer (d. 1576)
  - Nicholas Bobadilla, one of the first Spanish Jesuits (d. 1590)
  - Pierre Viret, Swiss reformed theologian (d. 1571)
  - Gaspar Cervantes de Gaeta, Spanish cardinal (d. 1575)

1512

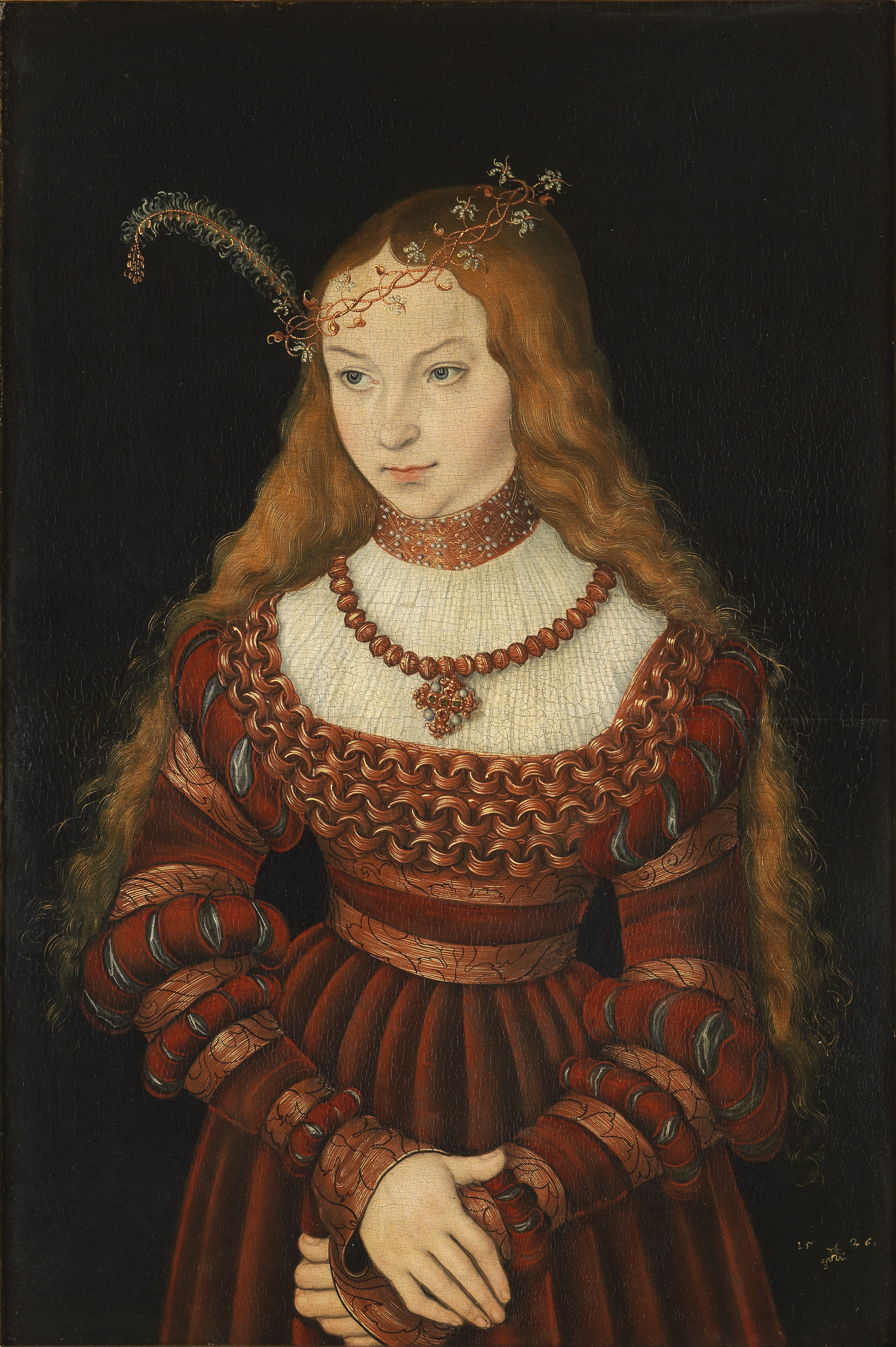
Sibylle of Cleves

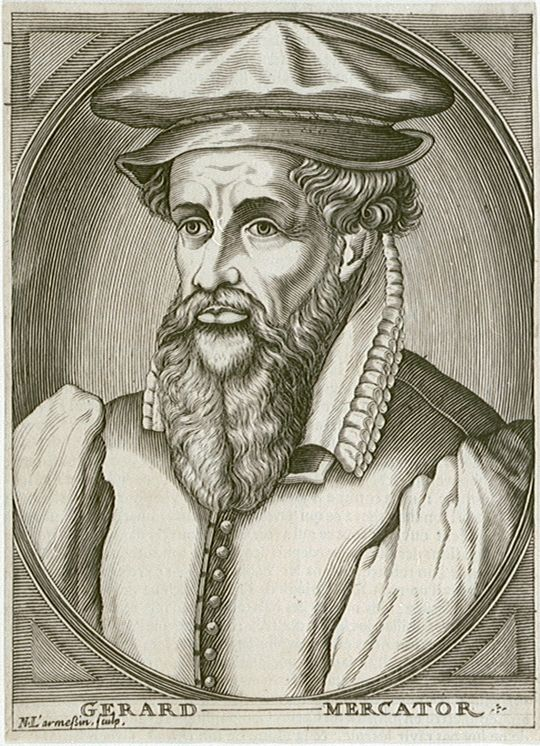
Gerardus Mercator

- January 13 – Gaspar de Quiroga y Vela, General Inquisitor of Spain (d. 1594)
- January 17 – Sibylle of Cleves, electress consort of Saxony (d. 1554)
- January 31 – Henry, King of Portugal and Cardinal (d. 1580)
- February 3 – John Hamilton, archbishop of St Andrews (d. 1571)
- February 22 – Pedro Agustín, Spanish Catholic bishop (d. 1572)
- March 5 – Gerardus Mercator, Flemish cartographer (d. 1594)
- April 10 – James V of Scotland, King of Scots (d. 1542)
- April 23 – Henry FitzAlan, 19th Earl of Arundel, Chancellor of the University of Oxford (d. 1580)
- April 30 – George II, Duke of Münsterberg-Oels, Count of Glatz (d. 1553)
- July 5 – Cristoforo Madruzzo, Italian Catholic cardinal (d. 1578)
- July 25 – Diego de Covarrubias y Leyva, Spanish jurist, Roman Catholic prelate, Archbishop of Cuenca (d. 1577)
- August ? – Catherine Parr, English queen consort (d. 1548)
- August 27 – Friedrich Staphylus, German theologian (d. 1564)
- November 4 – Hu Zongxian, Chinese general (d. 1565)
- November 9 – Jon Simonssøn, Norwegian humanist (d. 1575)
- November 11 – Marcin Kromer, Prince-Bishop of Warmia (d. 1589)
- December 21 – Boniface IV, Marquess of Montferrat, Italian nobleman (d. 1530)
- date unknown
  - Robert Recorde, Welsh physician and mathematician (d. 1558)
  - Gissur Einarsson, first Lutheran bishop in Iceland (d. 1548)

1513

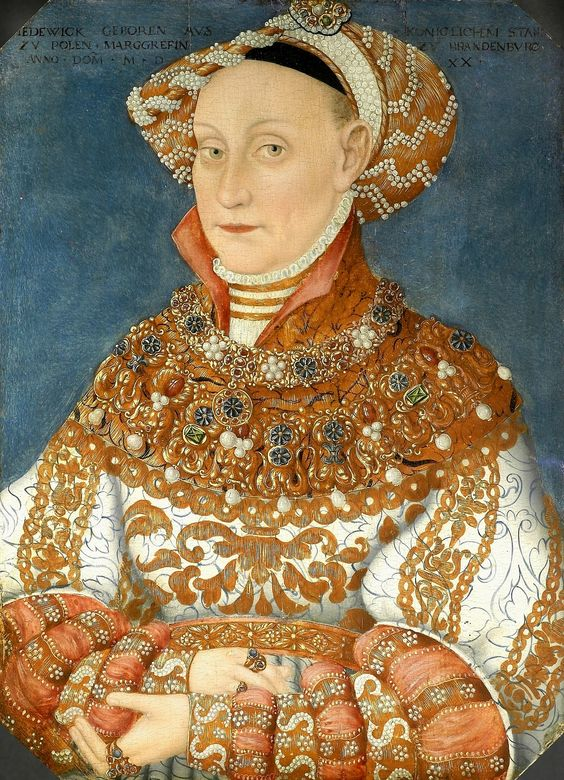
Hedwig Jagiellon, Electress of Brandenburg

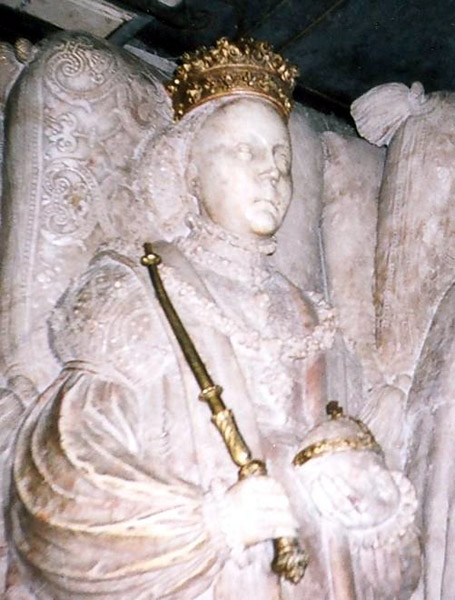
Catherine of Saxe-Lauenburg

- February 14 – Domenico Ferrabosco, Italian composer (d. 1573)
- March 15 – Hedwig Jagiellon, Electress of Brandenburg (d. 1573)
- April 22 – Tachibana Dōsetsu, Japanese Daimyō (d. 1585)
- June 10 – Louis, Duke of Montpensier (1561–1582) (d. 1582)
- August 3 – John, Margrave of Brandenburg-Küstrin (d. 1571)
- September 23 – Hans Buser, Swiss noble (d. 1544)
- September 24 – Catherine of Saxe-Lauenburg, queen of Gustav I of Sweden (d. 1535)
- October 30 – Jacques Amyot, French writer (d. 1593)
- December 3 – Lorenzo Strozzi, Italian Catholic cardinal (d. 1571)
- December 23 – Thomas Smith, English scholar and diplomat (d. 1577)
- date unknown
  - Abe Motozane, Japanese general (d. 1587)
  - Anna Hogenskild, Swedish lady-in-waiting (d. 1590)
  - Michael Baius, Belgian theologian (d. 1589)
  - George Cassander, Flemish theologian (d. 1566)
  - Thomas FitzGerald, 10th Earl of Kildare (d. 1537)
  - Elisabeth Plainacher, Austrian alleged witch (d. 1583)

1514

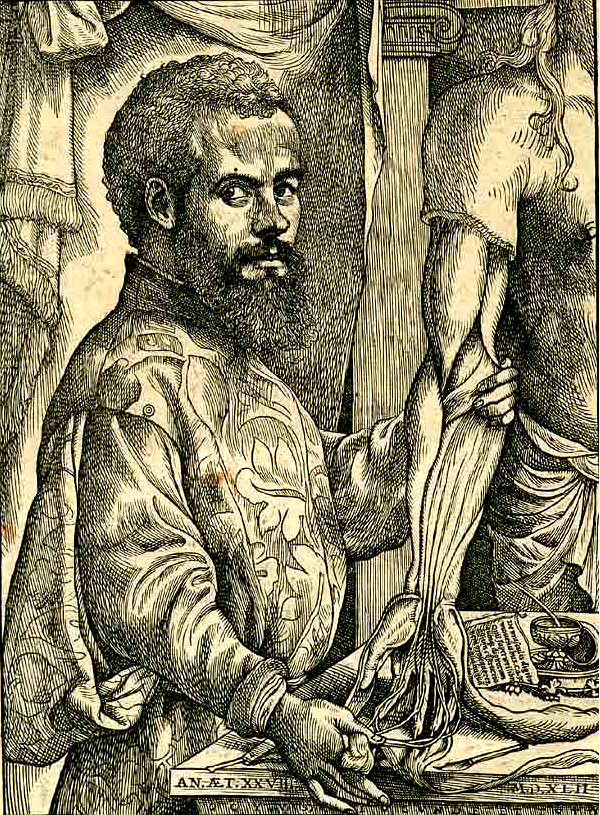
Andreas Vesalius

- January 1 – George Gordon, 4th Earl of Huntly, Scottish noble (d. 1562)
- January 23 – Hai Rui, Chinese official of the Ming Dynasty (d. 1587)
- January 27 – Bernardino Maffei, Italian Catholic cardinal (d. 1553)
- February 8 – Daniele Barbaro, Venetian churchman, diplomat and scholar (d. 1570)
- February 10 – Domenico Bollani, Bishop of Milan (d. 1579)
- February 16 – Georg Joachim Rheticus, Austrian cartographer and scientific instrument maker (d. 1574)
- February 22 – Tahmasp I, Shah of Iran (d. 1576)
- February 22 – Johannes Gigas, German theologian (d. 1581)
- February 26 – Otto Truchsess von Waldburg, German Catholic cardinal (d. 1573)
- March 8 – Amago Haruhisa, Japanese samurai and warlord (d. 1561)
- March 23 – Lorenzino de' Medici, Italian writer and assassin (d. 1548)
- April 2 – Guidobaldo II della Rovere, Duke of Urbino, Italian condottiero (d. 1574)
- April 5 – Joachim Mörlin, German bishop (d. 1571)
- April 30 – Alexander Stewart, Duke of Ross, Scottish prince (d. 1515)
- May 28 – Shimazu Takahisa, daimyō and fifteenth head of the Shimazu clan (d. 1571)
- June 16 – John Cheke, English classical scholar and statesman (d. 1557)
- August 29 – García Álvarez de Toledo, 4th Marquis of Villafranca, Spanish noble and admiral (d. 1577)
- September 12 – Philip, Duke of Mecklenburg, (d. 1557)
- September 20 – Philipp IV, Count of Hanau-Lichtenberg (d. 1590)
- September 24 – Prospero Santacroce, Italian Roman Catholic cardinal (d. 1589)
- October 7 – Queen Inseong, Korean royal consort (d. 1578)
- October 31 – Wolfgang Lazius, Austrian historian (d. 1565)
- November 29 – Andreas Musculus, German theologian (d. 1581)
- November 30 – Andreas Masius, German Catholic priest (d. 1573)
- December 31 – Andreas Vesalius, Flemish anatomist (d. 1564)
- date unknown
  - Hosokawa Harumoto, Japanese military leader (d. 1563)
  - George Gordon, 4th Earl of Huntly, Scottish nobleman (d. 1562)
  - Charles de Mornay, Swedish (originally French) court official, diplomat and royal favorite (d. 1574)
  - John Knox, Scottish clergyman, theologian and writer (d. 1572)
  - Barbara Uthmann, German businessperson (d. 1575)

1515

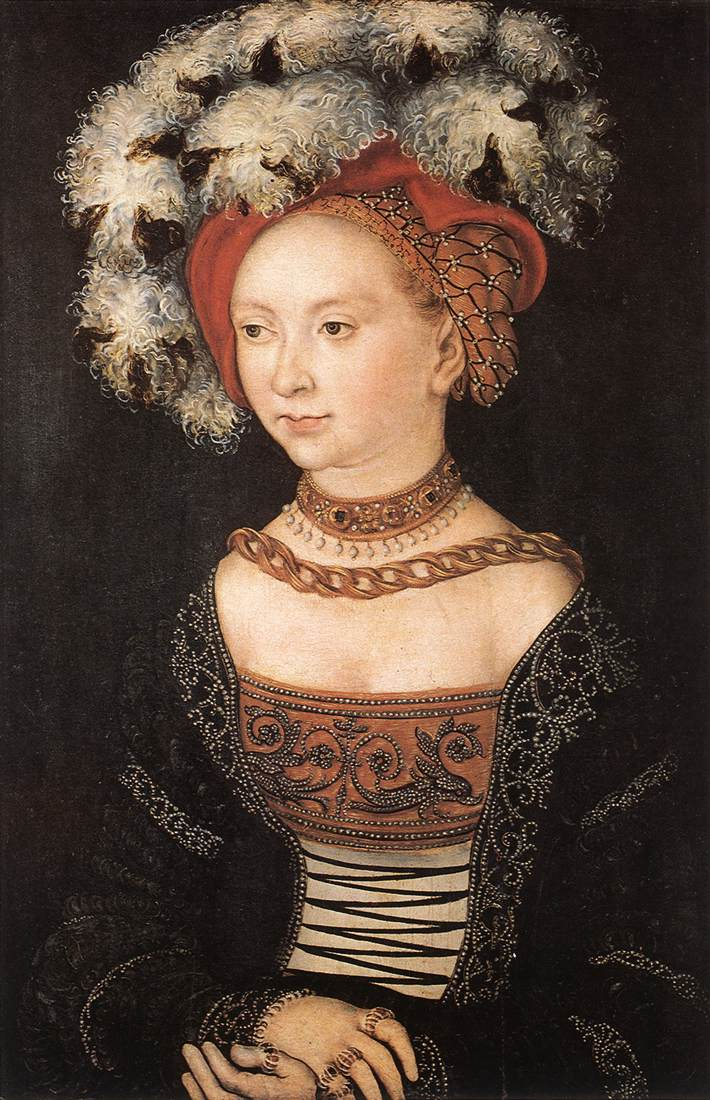
Sybille of Saxony

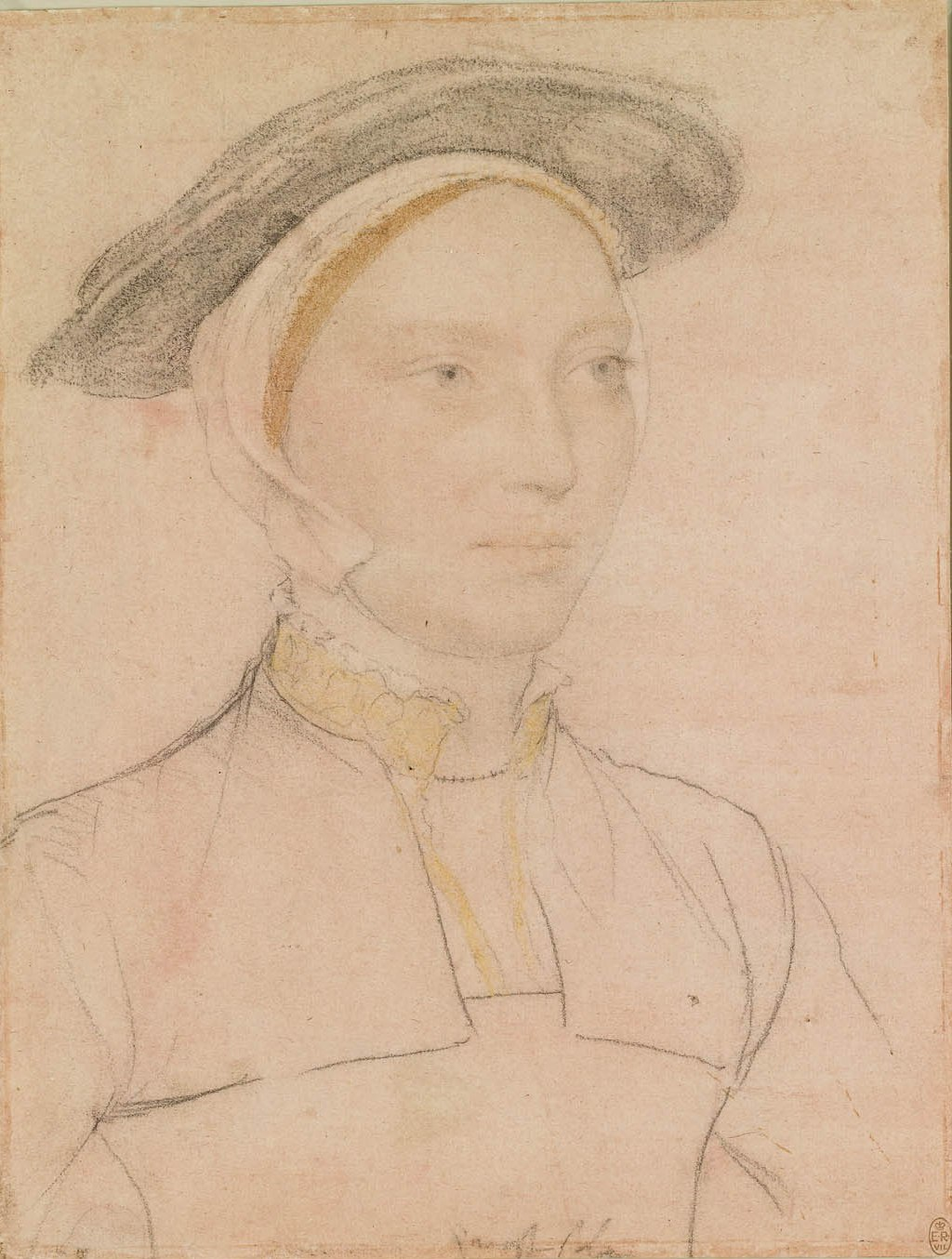
Anne Parr, Countess of Pembroke

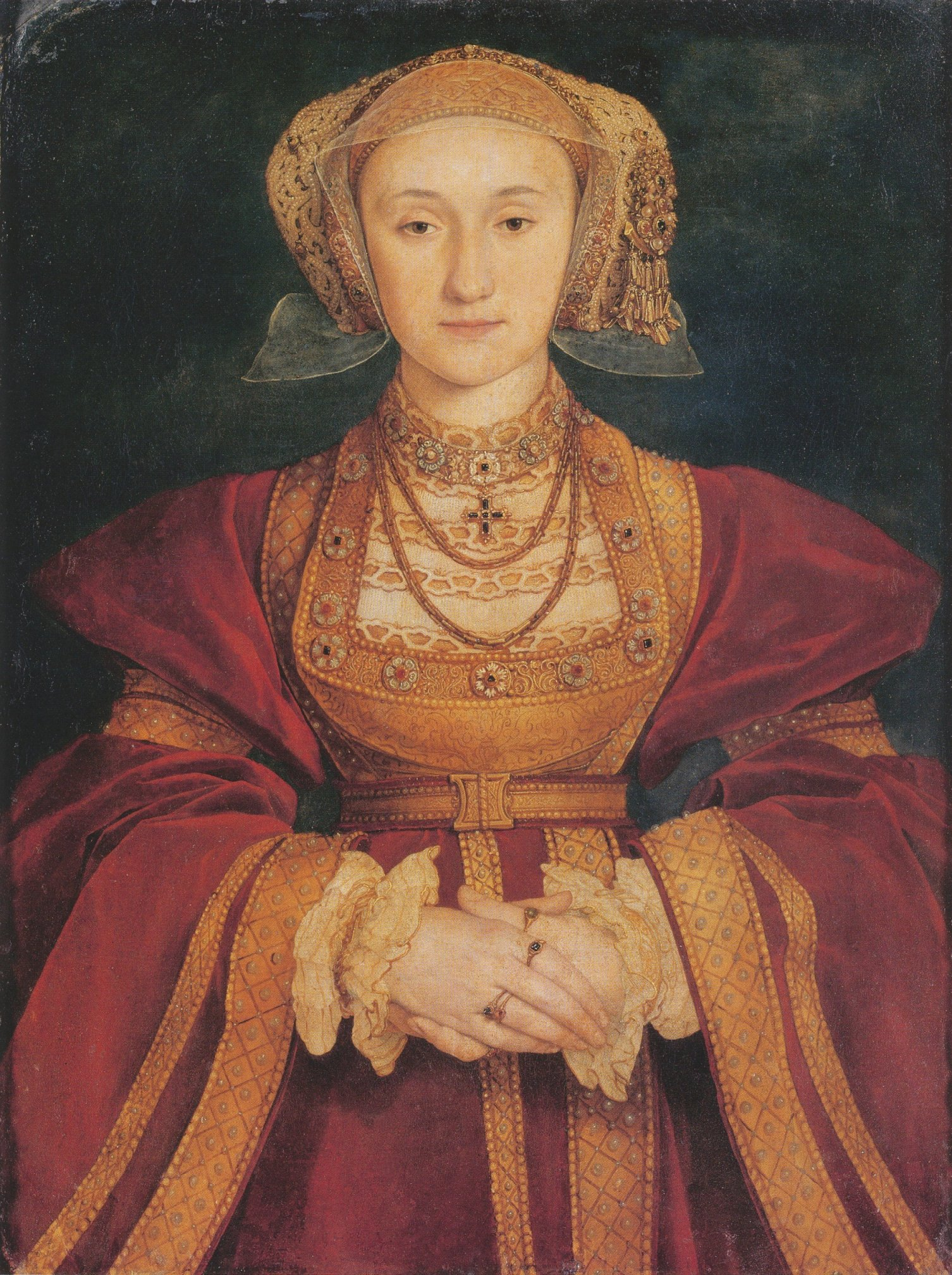
Anne of Cleves

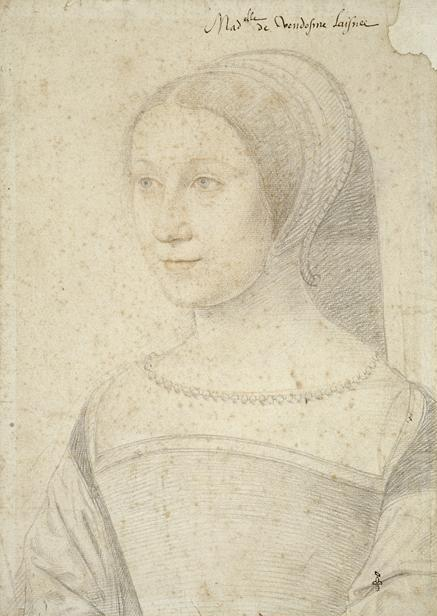
Mary of Bourbon

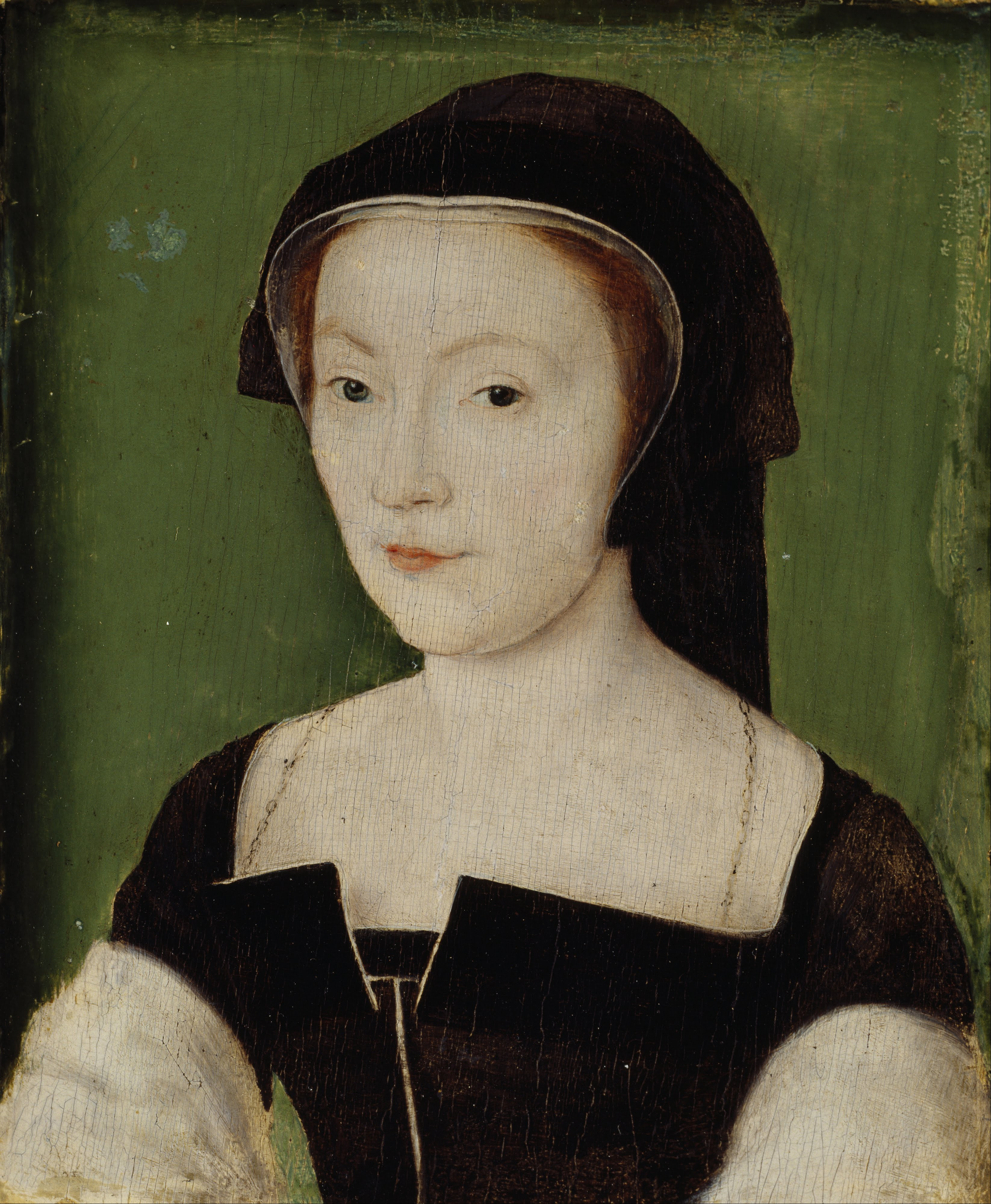
Mary of Guise

- January 1 – Johann Weyer, Dutch physician (d. 1588)
- February 4 – Mikołaj "the Black" Radziwiłł, Polish magnate (d. 1565)
- February 14 – Frederick III, Elector Palatine, ruler from the house of Wittelsbach (d. 1576)
- February 18 – Valerius Cordus, German physician, botanist and author (d. 1544)
- March 10 – Injong of Joseon, 12th king of the Joseon Dynasty of Korea (d. 1545)
- March 12 – Caspar Othmayr, German Protestant priest, theologian and composer (d. 1553)
- March 28 – Teresa of Ávila, Spanish Carmelite nun, poet and saint (d. 1582)
- May 2 – Sibylle of Saxony, Duchess of Saxe-Lauenburg (d. 1592)
- May 12
  - Christoph, Duke of Württemberg (1550–1568) (d. 1568)
  - Gilbert Kennedy, 3rd Earl of Cassilis, Scottish politician and judge (d. 1558)
- June 15 – Anne Parr, Countess of Pembroke, English countess (d. 1552)
- July 4 – Eleonora d'Este, Ferranese noblewoman (d. 1575)
- July 10 – Francisco de Toledo, Viceroy of Peru (d. 1582)
- July 14 – Philip I, Duke of Pomerania-Wolgast (d. 1560)
- July 21 – Philip Neri, Italian Roman Catholic saint (d. 1595)
- September 8 – Alfonso Salmeron, Spanish biblical scholar and early Jesuit (d. 1585)
- September 22 – Anne of Cleves, Fourth Queen of Henry VIII of England (d. 1557)
- October 4 – Lucas Cranach the Younger, German painter (d. 1586)
- October 7 – Infante Duarte, Duke of Guimarães, son of King Manuel I of Portugal (d. 1540)
- October 8 – Margaret Douglas, daughter of Archibald Douglas (d. 1578)
- October 15 – Leone Strozzi, French Navy admiral (d. 1554)
- October 29
  - Vincenzo Borghini, Italian monk (d. 1580)
  - Mary of Bourbon, daughter of Charles, Duke of Vendôme (d. 1538)
- November 22 – Mary of Guise, queen of James V of Scotland and regent of Scotland (d. 1560)
- December 15 – Maria of Saxony, Duchess of Pomerania (d. 1583)
- date unknown
  - Gilbert Kennedy, 3rd Earl of Cassilis, Scottish peer (d. 1558)
  - Sebastian Castellio, rector of the College of Geneva (d. 1563)
  - Sehzade Mustafa, First born son of Suleiman the Magnificent by Mahidevran Hatun (d. 1553)
  - Cristóbal Acosta, Portuguese doctor and natural historian (d. 1580)
  - Injong of Joseon, 12th king of the Joseon Dynasty of Korea (d. 1545)
  - Pierre de la Ramée, French humanist scholar (d. 1572)
  - Thomas Seckford, Master of Requests for Elizabeth I of England (d. 1587)
  - Thomas Watson, English Catholic bishop (d. 1584)
- probable
  - Leonard Digges, English mathematician and surveyor (d. c. 1559)
  - Jean Maillard, French composer
  - Laurence Nowell, English antiquarian (d. 1571)
  - Cipriano de Rore, Flemish composer and teacher (d. 1565)
  - Nicholas Throckmorton, English churchman, last abbot of Westminster (d. 1571)
  - John Willock, Scottish reformer (d. 1585)

1516

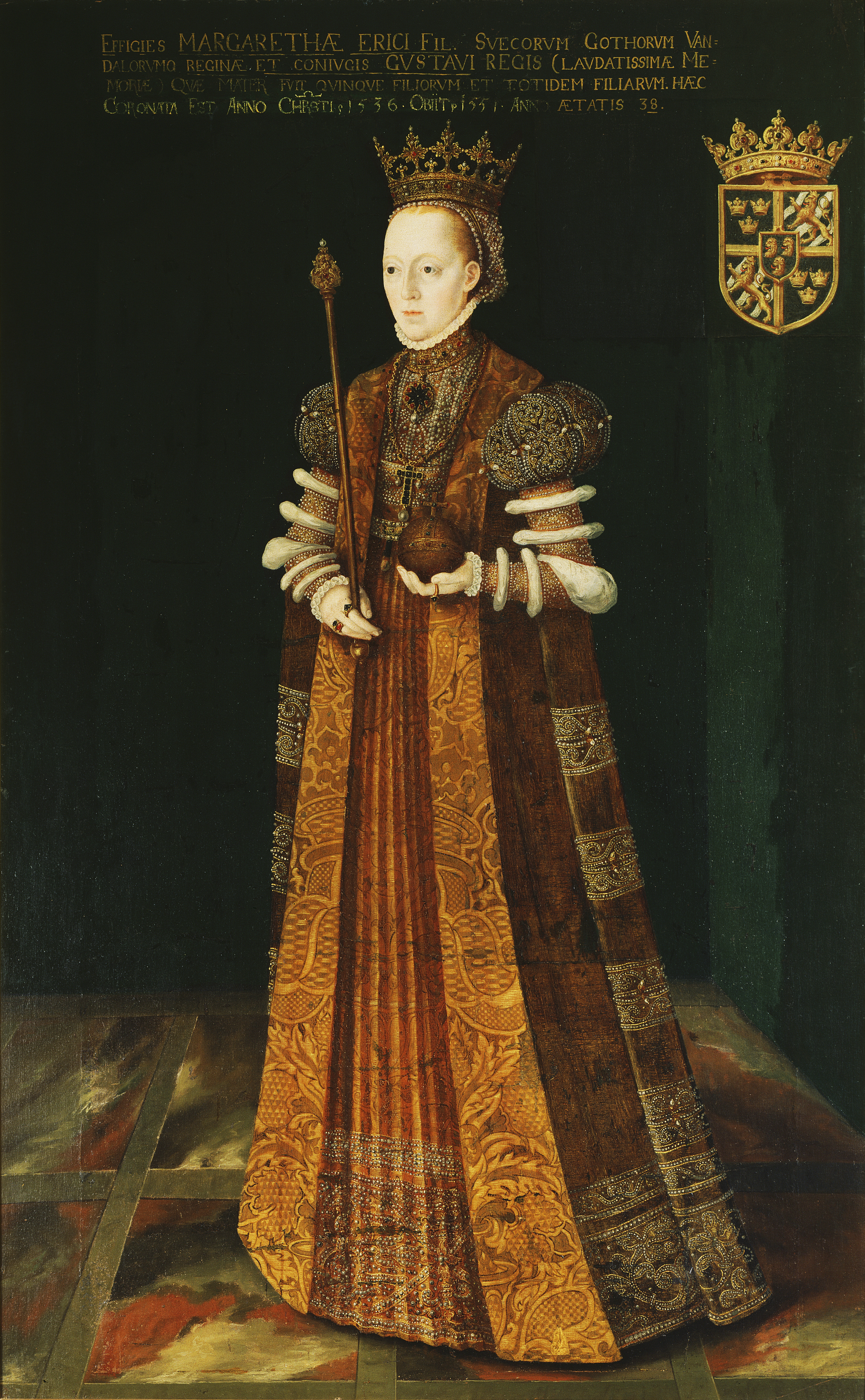
Margaret Leijonhufvud

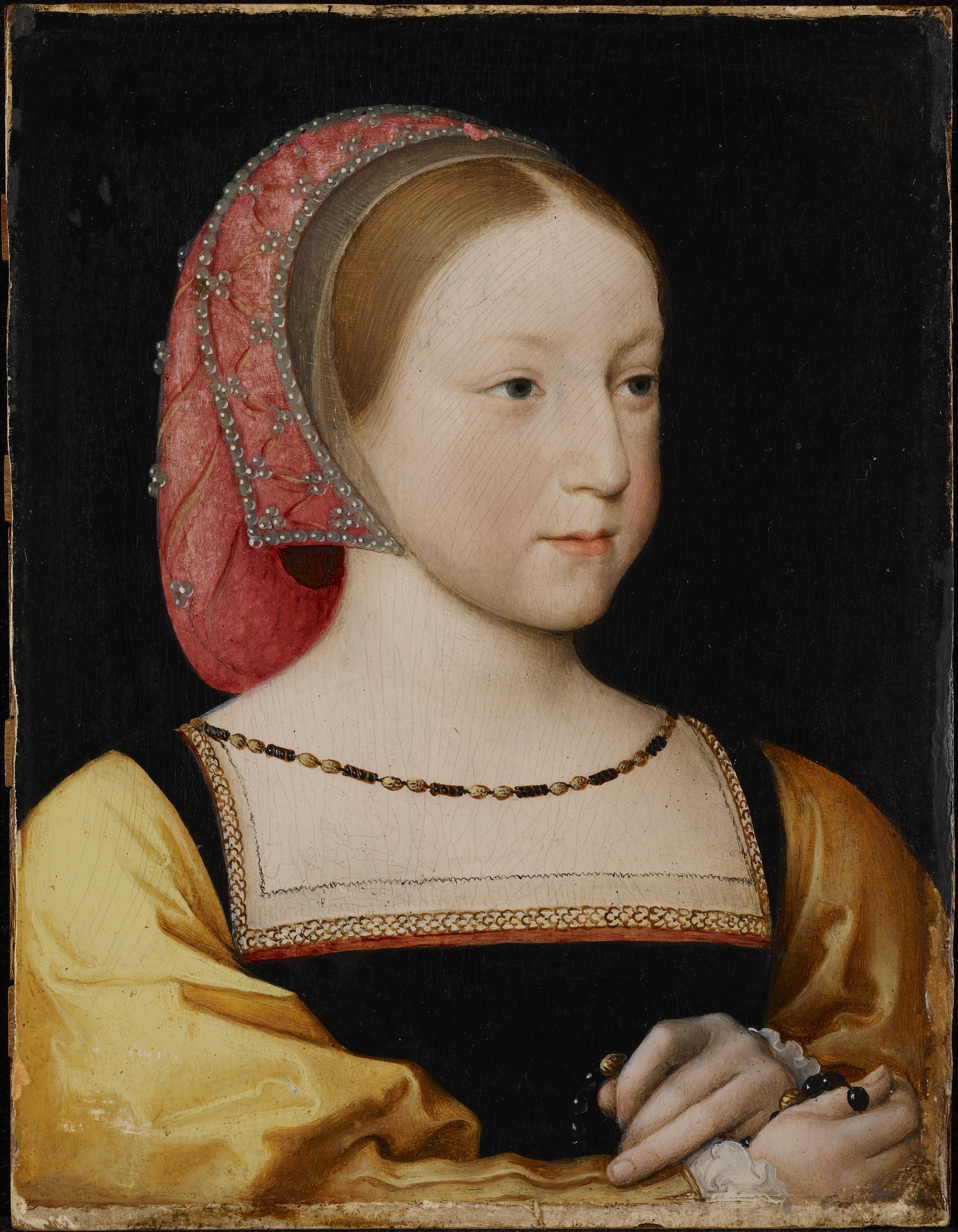
Charlotte of Valois

- January 1 – Margaret Leijonhufvud, queen of Gustav I of Sweden (d. 1551)
- January 14 – Herluf Trolle, Danish admiral (d. 1565)
- January 16 – Bayinnaung, King of Burma (d. 1581)
- February 2 – Girolamo Zanchi, Italian theologian (d. 1590)
- February 16 – Prospero Spani, Italian sculptor (d. 1584)
- February 18 – Queen Mary I of England, daughter of King Henry VIII of England and Queen Catherine of Aragon (d. 1558)
- March 15 – Alqas Mirza, Safavid prince (d. 1550)
- March 26 – Conrad Gessner, Swiss naturalist (d. 1565)
- April 16 – Tabinshwehti, King of Burma (d. 1550)
- April 23 – Georg Fabricius, Protestant German poet (d. 1571)
- June 28 – Charles Blount, 5th Baron Mountjoy, English courtier and patron of learning (d. 1544)
- July 27 – Emilie of Saxony, German nobleman (d. 1591)
- July 28 – William, Duke of Jülich-Cleves-Berg, German nobleman (d. 1592)
- August 13 – Hieronymus Wolf, German historian (d. 1580)
- September 2 – Francis I, Duke of Nevers (d. 1561)
- September 21 – Matthew Stewart, 4th Earl of Lennox (d. 1571)
- October 23 – Charlotte of Valois, French princess (d. 1524)
- October 27 – Ruy Gómez de Silva, Portuguese noble (d. 1573)
- November 5 – Martin Helwig, German cartographer of Silesia (d. 1574)
- December 21 – Giuseppe Leggiadri Gallani, Italian poet and dramatist (d. 1590)
- date unknown
  - John Foxe, biographer (d. 1587)
  - Manco Inca Yupanqui, ruler of the Inca (d. 1544)
  - Canghali of Kazan, khan of Qasim and Kazan (d. 1535)
  - Margaretha Coppier, Dutch heroine (d. 1597)

1517

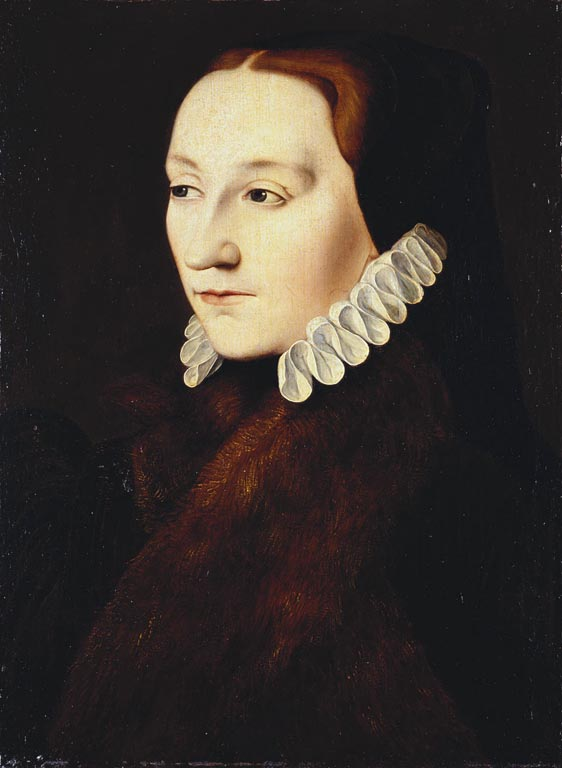
Frances Grey, Duchess of Suffolk

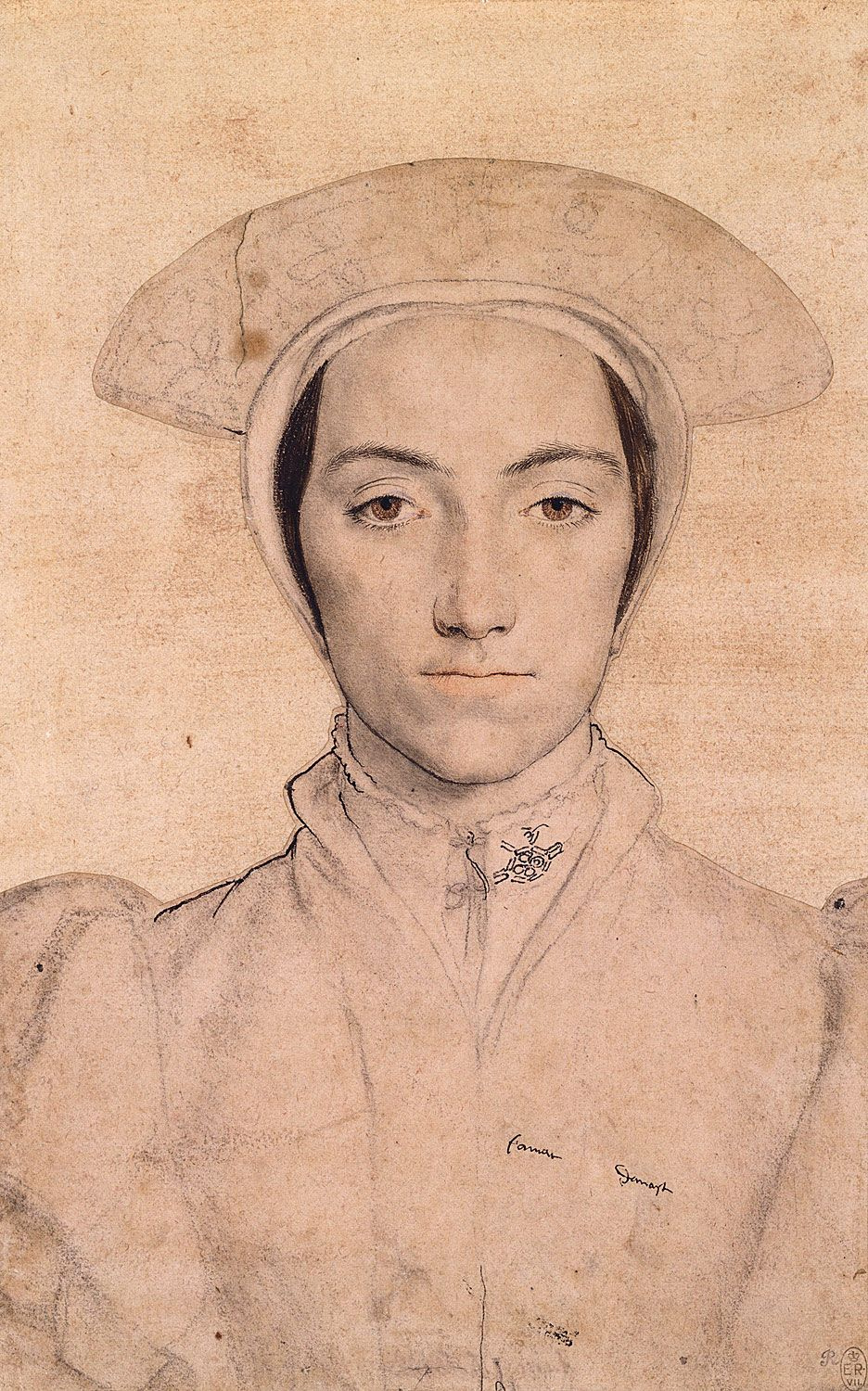
Amalia of Cleves

- January 17
  - Henry Grey, 1st Duke of Suffolk, English duke (d. 1554)
  - Antonio Scandello, Italian composer (d. 1580)
- January 30 – Joannes Aurifaber Vratislaviensis, German theologian (d. 1568)
- January 31 – Gioseffo Zarlino, Italian composer (d. 1590)
- February 2 – Gotthard Kettler, Duke of Courland and Semigallia (d. 1587)
- February 12 – Luigi Cornaro, Italian Catholic cardinal (d. 1584)
- March 29 – Carlo Carafa, Italian Catholic cardinal (d. 1561)
- May 1 – Svante Stensson Sture, Swedish count (d. 1567)
- June 18 – Emperor Ōgimachi, Japanese emperor (d. 1593)
- June 29 – Rembert Dodoens, Flemish botanist (d. 1585)
- July 10 – Odet de Coligny, French cardinal and Protestant (d. 1571)
- July 16 – Frances Grey, Duchess of Suffolk, English duchess (d. 1559)
- July 20 – Peter Ernst I von Mansfeld-Vorderort, Governor of the Habsburg Netherlands (d. 1604)
- July 25 – Jacques Pelletier du Mans, French mathematician (d. 1582)
- August 20 – Antoine Perrenot de Granvelle, statesman, French Catholic cardinal (d. 1586)
- August 23 – Francis I, Duke of Lorraine (d. 1545)
- September 6 – Francisco de Holanda, Portuguese artist (d. 1585)
- October 17 – Amalia of Cleves, German princess and writer (d. 1586)
- October 18 – Manuel da Nóbrega, Spanish Catholic priest (d. 1570)
- December 15 – Giacomo Gaggini, Italian artist (d. 1598)
- date unknown
  - Hayashi Narinaga, Japanese samurai (d. 1605)
  - Henry Howard, Earl of Surrey, English aristocrat (d. 1547)

1518

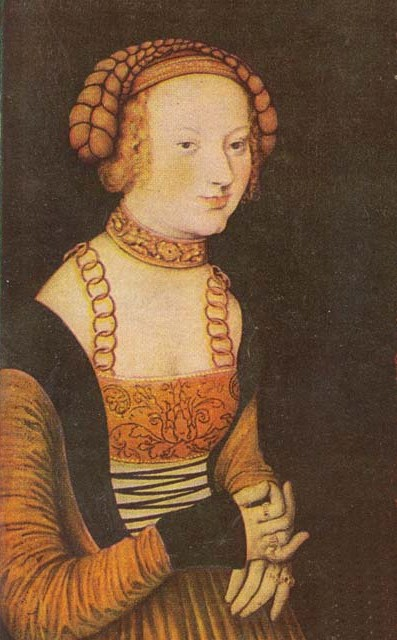
Sidonie of Saxony

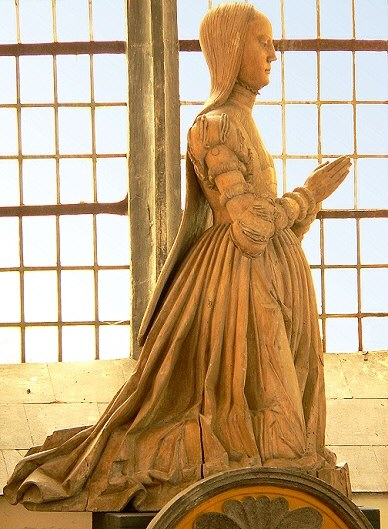
Clara of Saxe-Lauenburg

- February 2
  - Johann Hommel, German astronomer and mathematician (d. 1562)
  - Godfried van Mierlo, Dutch Dominican friar and bishop (d. 1587)
- February 7 – Johann Funck, German theologian (d. 1566)
- February 13 – Antonín Brus of Mohelnice, Moravian Catholic archbishop (d. 1580)
- February 20 – Georg, Count Palatine of Simmern-Sponheim, (d. 1569)
- February 21 – John of Denmark, Danish prince (d. 1532)
- February 28 – Francis III, Duke of Brittany, Duke of Brittany (d. 1536)
- March 8 – Sidonie of Saxony, Duchess of Brunswick-Calenberg (d. 1575)
- April 22 – Antoine de Bourbon, father of Henry IV of France (d. 1562)
- July 3 – Li Shizhen, Chinese physician, pharmacologist and mineralogist (d. 1593)
- August 8 – Conrad Lycosthenes, Alsatian humanist and encyclopedist (d. 1561)
- September/October – Tintoretto, Italian painter (d. 1594)
- November 26 – Guido Ascanio Sforza di Santa Fiora, Italian Catholic cardinal (d. 1564)
- December 13 – Clara of Saxe-Lauenburg, Princess of Saxe-Lauenburg and Duchess of Brunswick-Gifhorn by marriage (d. 1576)
- December 17 – Ernest III, Duke of Brunswick-Grubenhagen (d. 1567)
- December 19 – Enrique de Borja y Aragón, Spanish noble of the House of Borgia (d. 1540)
- date unknown
  - James Halyburton, Scottish reformer (d. 1589)
  - Hubert Languet, French diplomat and reformer (d. 1581)
  - Edmund Plowden, English legal scholar (d. 1585)
  - Mayken Verhulst (a.k.a. Marie Bessemers), Flemish artist (d. 1596 or 1599)
- possible – Catherine Howard, fifth queen consort of Henry VIII of England (b. between 1518 and 1524; d. 1542)

1519

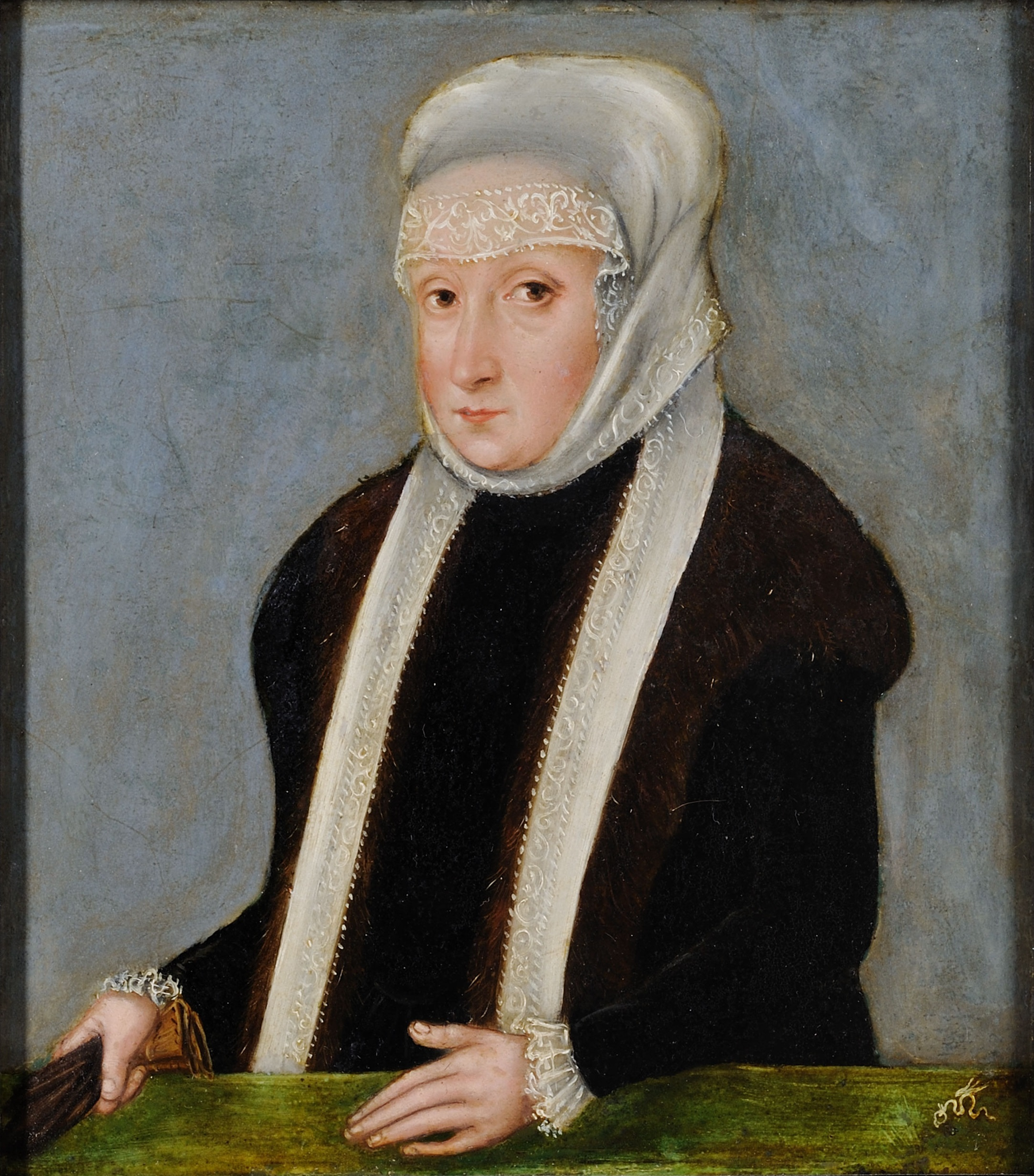
Isabella Jagiellon

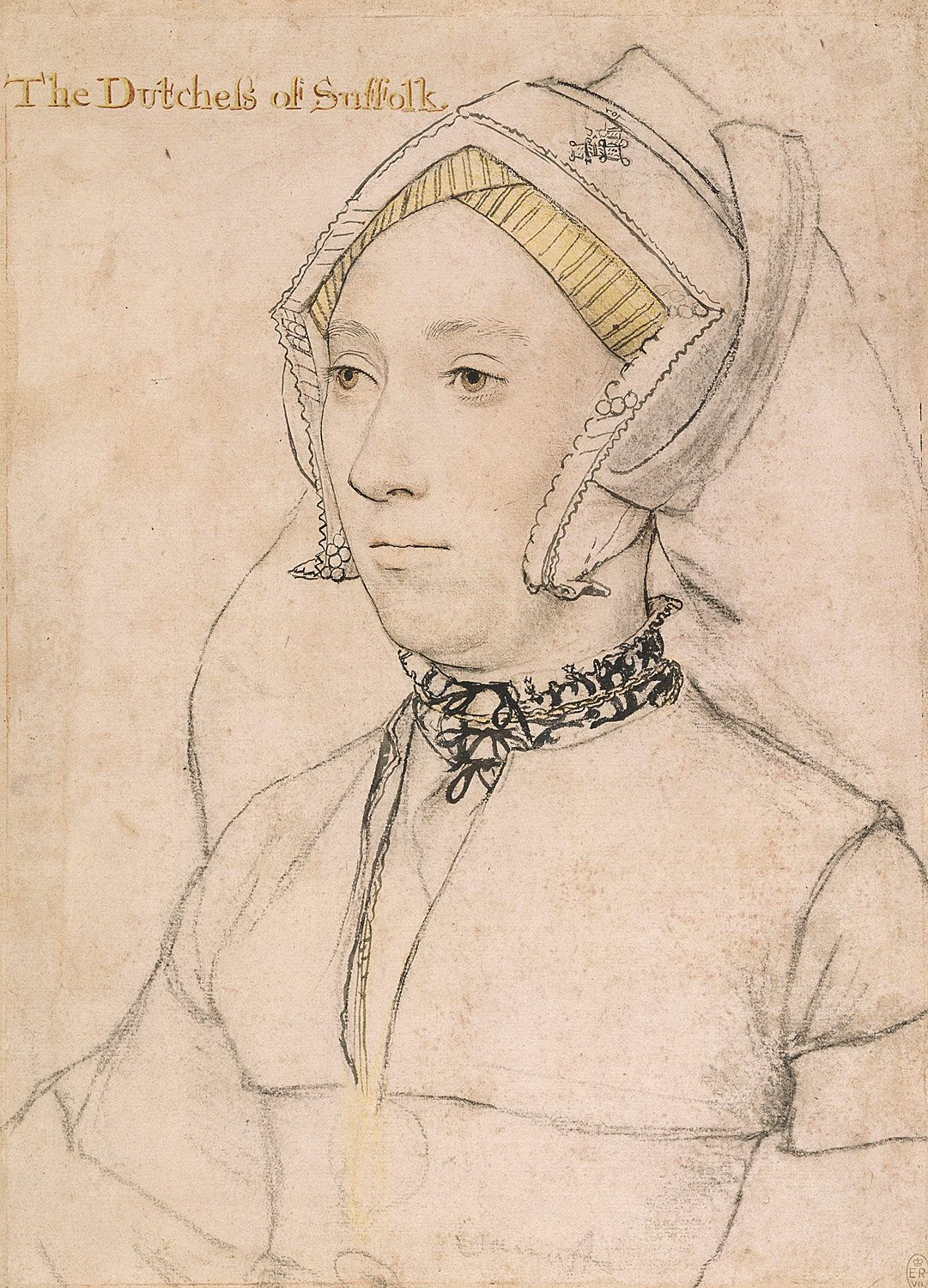
Catherine Brandon, Duchess of Suffolk

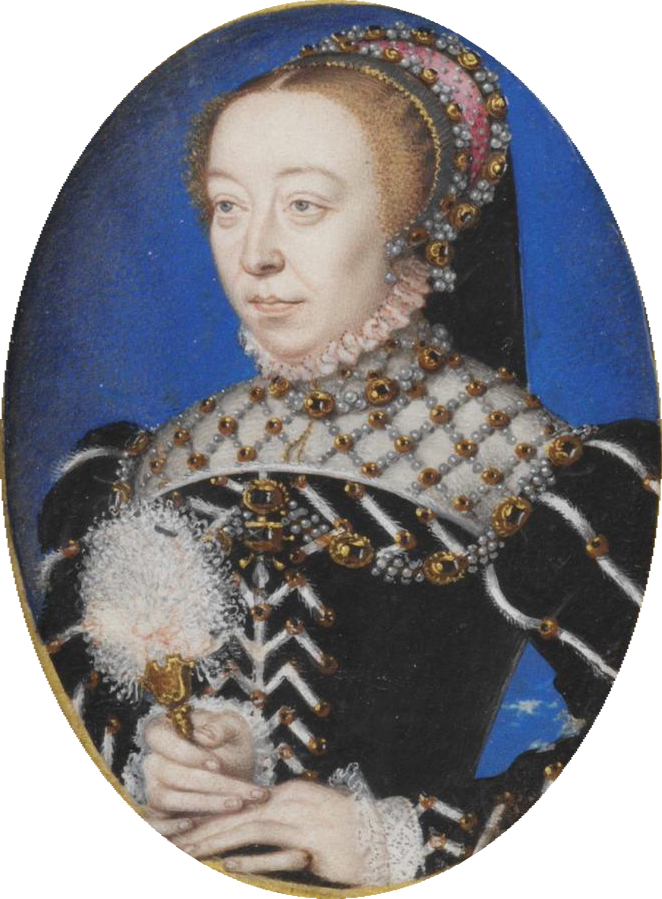
Catherine de' Medici

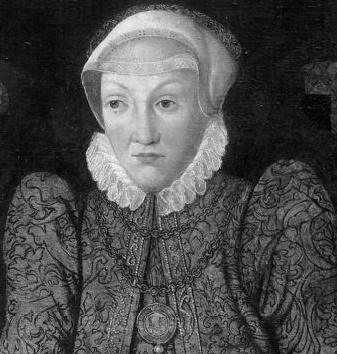
Marie of Brandenburg-Kulmbach

- January 1 – Gómez Pérez Dasmariñas, Spanish colonial administrator (d. 1593)
- January 18 – Isabella Jagiellon, queen consort of Hungary (d. 1559)
- February 5 – René of Châlon, Prince of the House of Orange (d. 1544)
- February 15 – Pedro Menéndez de Avilés, first Spanish Governor of Florida (d. 1574)
- February 16 – Gaspard de Coligny, French Huguenot leader (d. 1572)
- February 17 – Francis, Duke of Guise, French soldier and politician (d. 1563)
- February 19 – Froben Christoph of Zimmern, author of the Zimmern Chronicle (d. 1566)
- March 4
  - Hindal Mirza, Mughal Emperor (d. 1551)
  - Adrian Stokes, English politician (d. 1586)
- March 17 – Thoinot Arbeau, French priest and author (d. 1595)
- March 22 – Catherine Brandon, Duchess of Suffolk, English noblewoman (d. 1580)
- March 31 – King Henry II of France (d. 1559)
- April 13 – Catherine de' Medici, Italian noblewoman, queen consort of Henry II of France and regent of France (d. 1589)
- May 27 – Girolamo Mei, Italian humanist historian (d. 1594)
- June 6 – Andrea Cesalpino, Italian philosopher, physician, and botanist (d. 1603)
- June 12 – Cosimo I de' Medici, Grand Duke of Tuscany (d. 1574)
- June 15 – Henry FitzRoy, 1st Duke of Richmond and Somerset, illegitimate son of King Henry VIII of England (d. 1536)
- June 23 – Johannes Goropius Becanus, Dutch physician, linguist and humanist (d. 1572)
- June 24 – Theodore Beza, French theologian (d. 1605)
- July 20 – Pope Innocent IX (d. 1591)
- September 23 – Francis, Count of Enghien, French military leader (d. 1546)
- October 14 – Marie of Brandenburg-Kulmbach, Princess of Brandenburg-Kulmbach and by marriage Electress Palatine (d. 1567)
- November 9 – Ogasawara Nagatoki, Japanese daimyō (d. 1583)
- November 22 – Johannes Crato von Krafftheim, German humanist and physician (d. 1585)
- date unknown
  - Janet Beaton, Scottish noblewoman (d. 1569)
  - Nicholas Grimald, English poet (d. 1562)
  - Edwin Sandys, English archbishop (d. 1588)
  - Barbara Thenn, Austrian merchant and Münzmeister (d. 1579)
  - Imagawa Yoshimoto, Japanese warlord (d. 1560)
  - Paula Vicente, Portuguese artist, musician and writer (d. 1576)
  - Stanisław Zamoyski, Polish nobleman (d. 1572)
- probable
  - Thomas Gresham, English merchant and financier (d. 1579)
  - Edmund Grindal, Archbishop of Canterbury (d. 1583)
- possible
  - Catherine Howard, fifth Queen of Henry VIII of England (born between 1518 and 1524; d. 1542)

== Deaths ==
1510

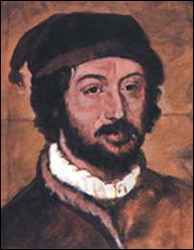
Juan de la Cosa

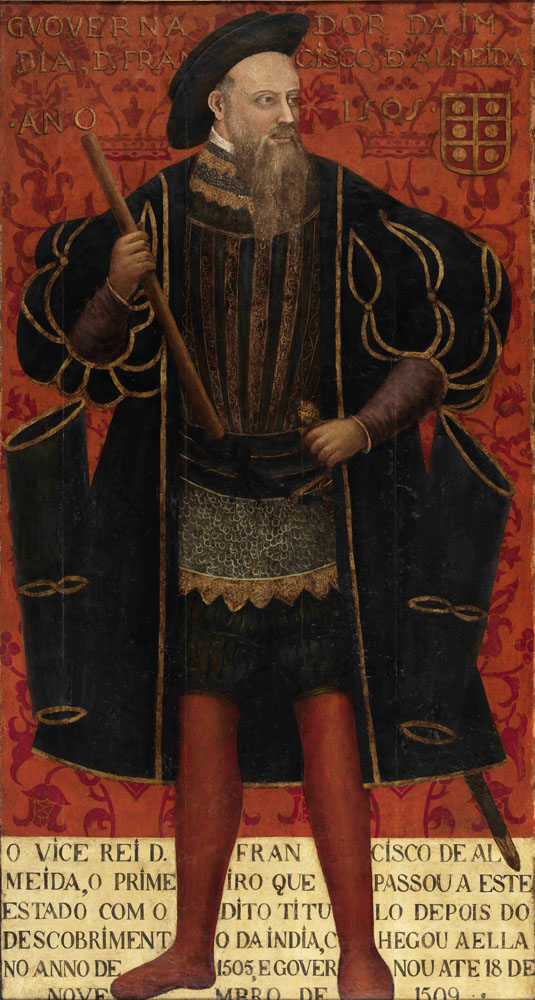
Francisco de Almeida

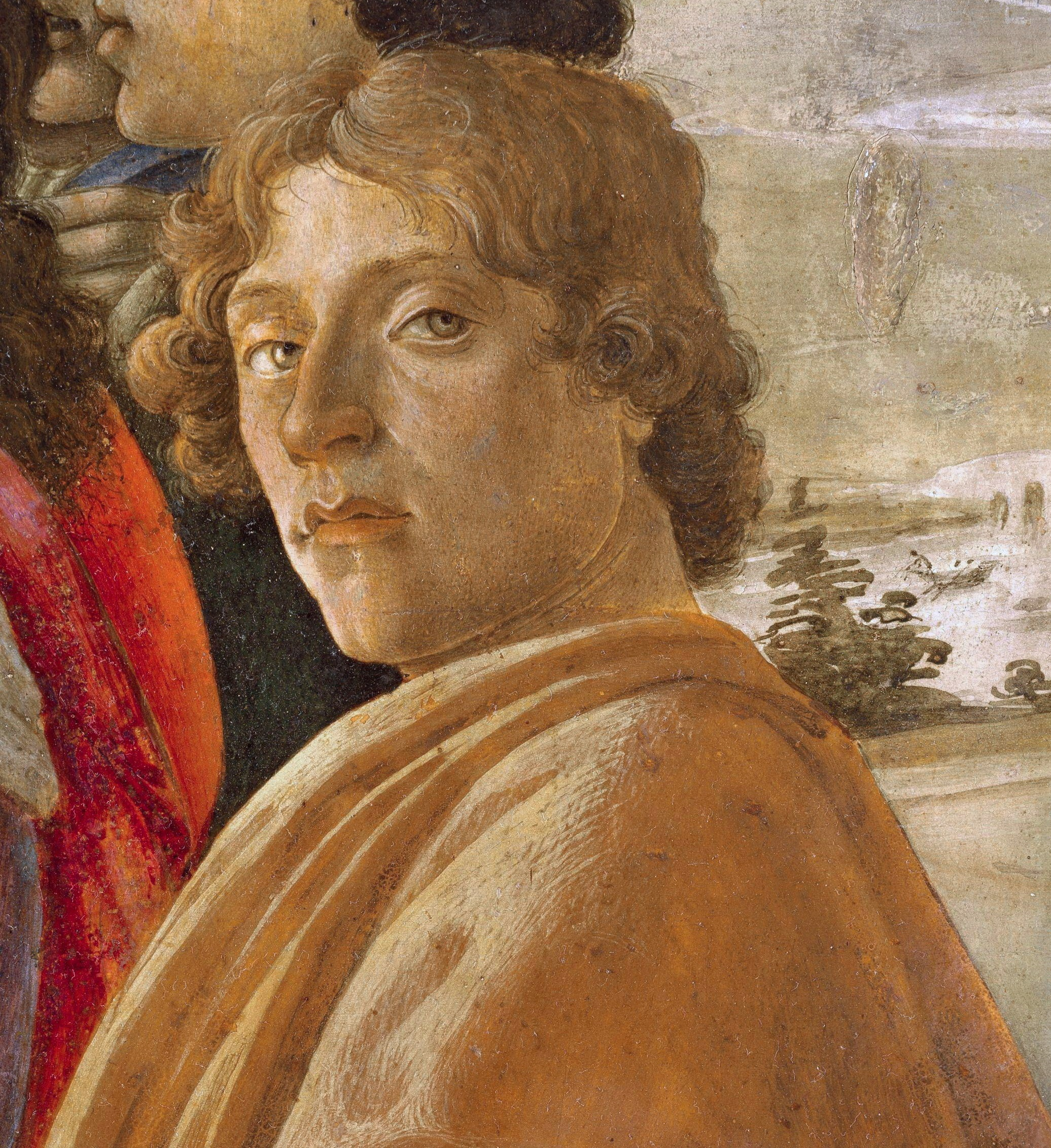
Sandro Botticelli

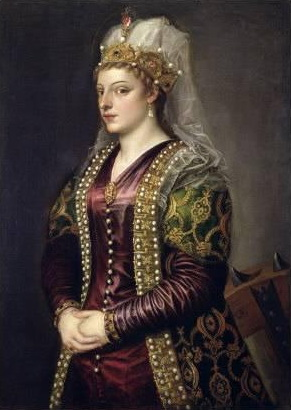
Catherine Cornaro

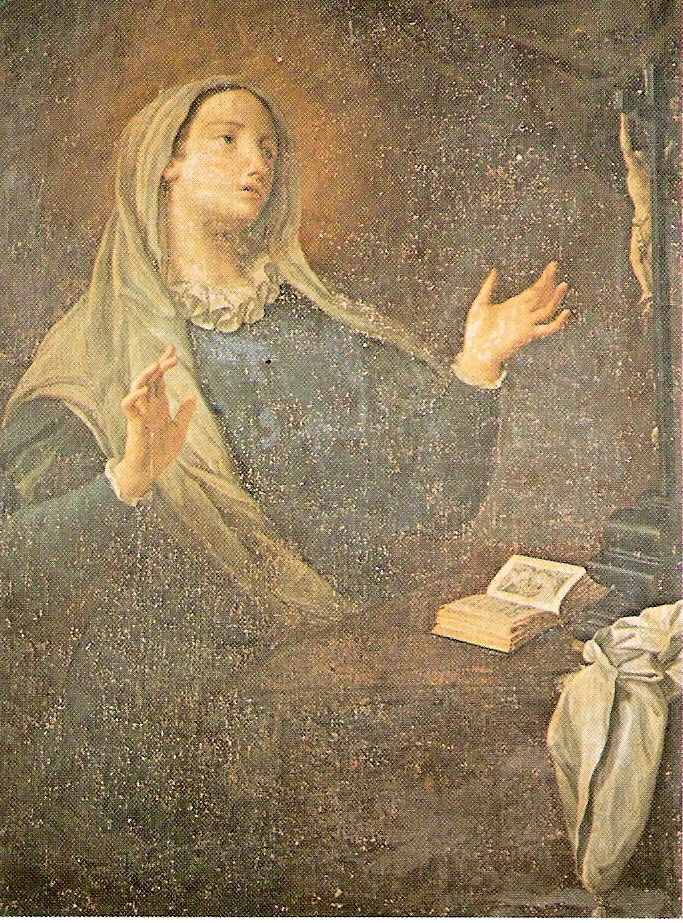
Saint Catherine of Genoa

- February 1 – Sidonie of Poděbrady, Bohemian princess, duchess consort of Saxony (b. 1449)
- February 28 – Juan de la Cosa, Spanish cartographer and explorer (b. c. 1460)
- March 1 – Francisco de Almeida, Portuguese soldier and explorer (b. c. 1450)
- March 10 – Johann Geiler von Kaisersberg, German preacher (b. 1445)
- May 17 – Sandro Botticelli, Italian painter (b. 1445)
- May 25 – Cardinal Georges d'Ambroise, aka Monseigneur le Ledat. Adviser to King Louis XII of France. (b. 1460)
- July 10 – Catherine Cornaro, Queen of Cyprus (b. 1454)
- July 14 – Arthur Stewart, Duke of Rothesay, heir to the Scottish throne (b. 1509)
- July 27 – Giovanni Sforza, Italian condottiere (b. 1466)
- August 17
  - Edmund Dudley, English statesman (b. c. 1462)
  - Richard Empson, English statesman
- September 15 – Saint Catherine of Genoa (b. 1447)
- September 17 – Giorgione, Italian painter (b. c. 1477)
- September 18 – Ursula of Brandenburg, Duchess of Mecklenburg-Schwerin (b. 1488)
- November 11 – Bohuslav Hasištejnský z Lobkovic, Bohemian writer (b. 1461)
- December 2 – Muhammad Shaybani, Khan of Bukhara (b. 1451)
- December 14 – Friedrich of Saxony (b. 1473)
- December 31 – Bianca Maria Sforza, Holy Roman Empress (b. 1472)
- date unknown
  - Agüeybaná, Taino chief
  - Giovanna d'Aragona, Duchess of Amalfi, Italian regent (b. 1478)
  - Mandukhai Khatun, Mongolian queen

1511

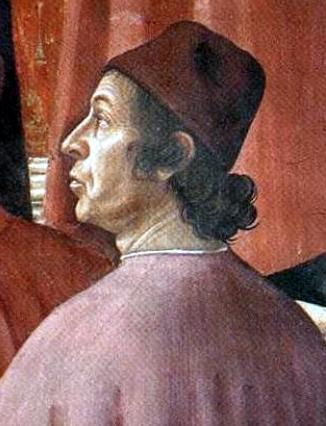
Demetrios Chalkokondyles

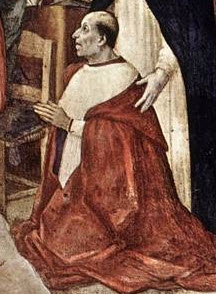
Oliviero Carafa

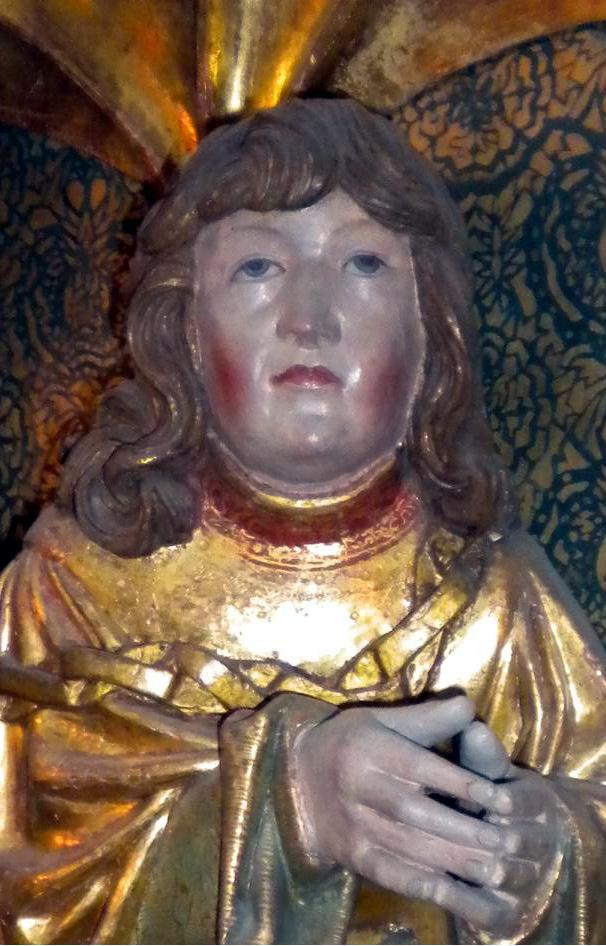
Francis of Denmark

- January 9 – Demetrios Chalkokondyles, Greek classical scholar (b. 1424)
- January 20 – Oliviero Carafa, Italian Catholic cardinal (b. 1430)
- February 22 – Henry, Duke of Cornwall, eldest son of Henry VIII of England
- April 1 – Francis of Denmark, Danish prince (b. 1497)
- April 2 – Bernard VII, Lord of Lippe, German nobleman (b. 1428)
- June 3 – Ahmad ibn Abi Jum'ah, North African Islamic scholar, author of the Oran fatwa
- June 13 – Hedwig, Abbess of Quedlinburg, Princess-Abbess of Quedlinburg (b. 1445)
- July 2 – Şahkulu, leader of the Şahkulu Rebellion
- July 6 – Adolf III of Nassau-Wiesbaden-Idstein, Germany noble (b. 1443)
- July 12 – Albert I, Duke of Münsterberg-Oels, Count of Kladsko (b. 1468)
- August 2 – Andrew Barton, Scottish naval leader (b. c. 1466)
- September 6
  - Ashikaga Yoshizumi, Japanese shogun (b. 1481)
  - William IV, Duke of Jülich-Berg, Count of Ravensberg (b. 1455)
- October 18 – Philippe de Commines, French-speaking Fleming in the courts of Burgundy and France (b. 1447)
- November 23
  - Mahmud Begada, Sultan of Gujarat (b. 1458)
  - Anne of York, daughter of King Edward IV of England (b. 1475)
- date unknown
  - Diego de Nicuesa, Spanish conquistador and explorer
  - Johannes Tinctoris, Flemish composer and music theorist (b. c. 1435)
  - Estefania Carròs i de Mur, Spanish educator (b. 1455)
  - Matthias Ringmann, German cartographer and humanist poet (b. 1482)
  - Yusuf Adil Shah, founding leader of the Adil Shahi Dynasty
- probable – Antoine de Févin, French composer (b. c. 1470)

1512

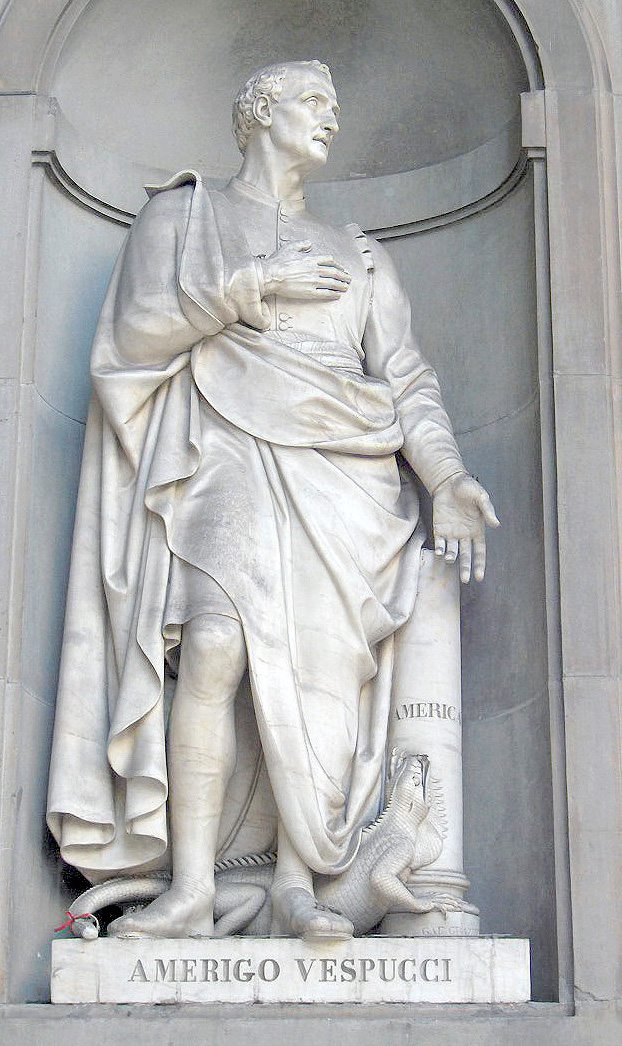
Amerigo Vespucci

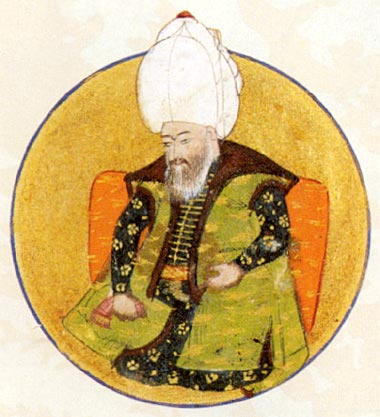
Sultan Bayezid II

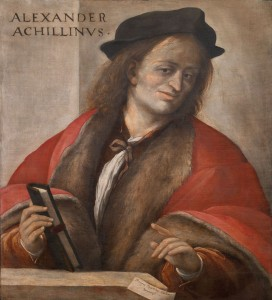
Alessandro Achillini

- January 2 – Svante Nilsson, regent of Sweden since 1504 (b. 1460)
- January 30 – Reinhard IV, Count of Hanau-Münzenberg (1500–1512) (b. 1473)
- February 2 – Hatuey, Puerto Rican Taíno chief
- February 22 – Amerigo Vespucci, Italian merchant and cartographer, after whom the Americas are named (b. 1451)
- March 29 – Lucas Watzenrode, Prince-Bishop of Warmia (b. 1447)
- April 11
  - Gaston de Foix, French military commander (b. 1489)
  - Asakura Sadakage, 9th head of the Asakura clan (b. 1473)
- May 21 – Pandolfo Petrucci, ruler of Siena (b. 1452)
- May 26 – Bayezid II, Ottoman Sultan (b. 1447)
- June 20 – Goto Yujo, Japanese swordsman and artisan (b. 1440)
- August 2 – Alessandro Achillini, Italian philosopher (b. 1463)
- August 15 – Imperia Cognati, Italian courtesan (b. 1486)
- September 15 – John Stewart, 1st Earl of Atholl, Scottish peer (b. 1440)
- September 29 – Johannes Engel, German doctor, astronomer and astrologer (b. 1453)
- October 5 – Sophia Jagiellon, Margravine of Brandenburg-Ansbach, Polish princess (b. 1464)
- October 31 – Anna of Saxony, Electress of Brandenburg (b. 1437)

1513

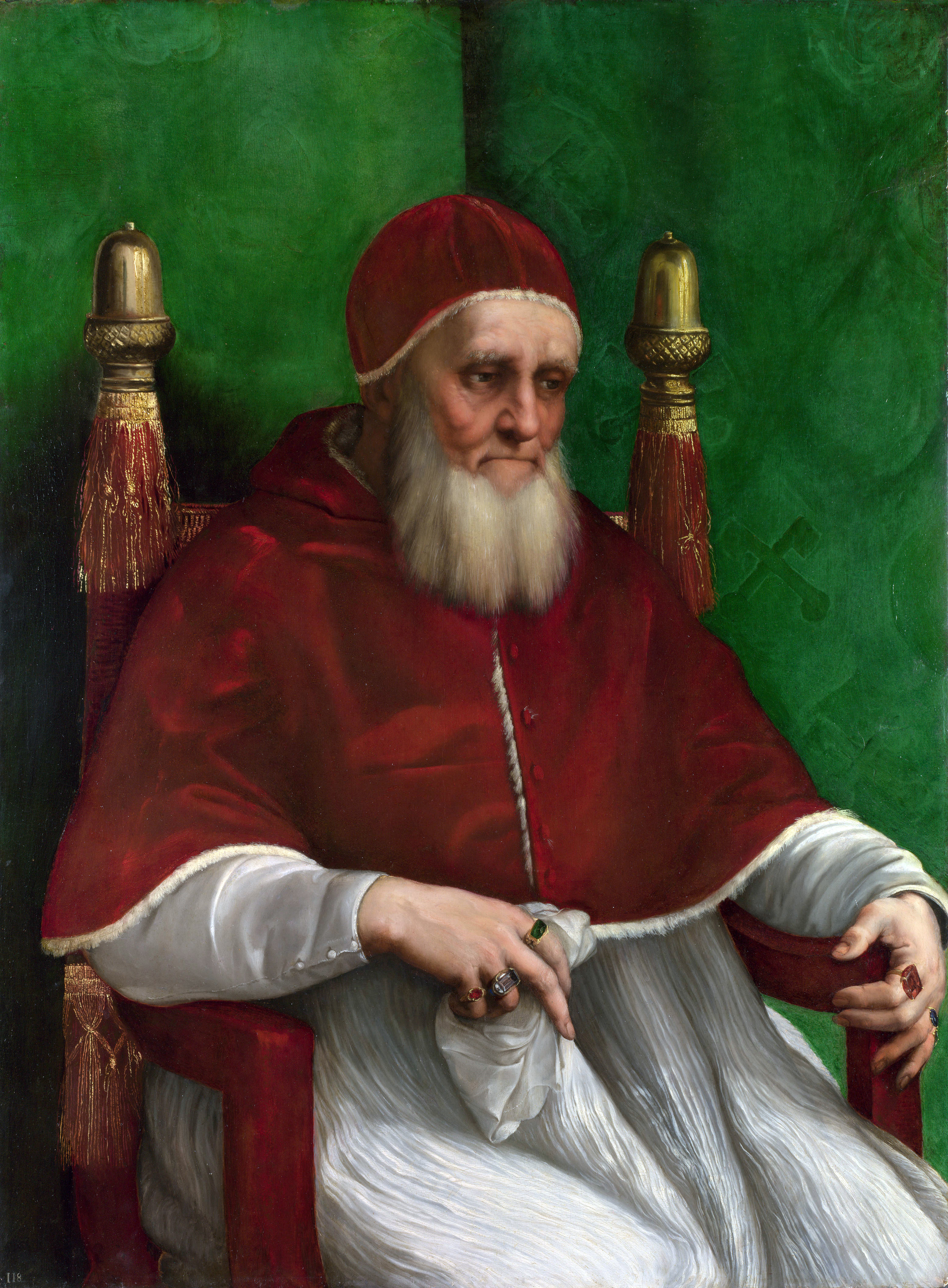
Pope Julius II

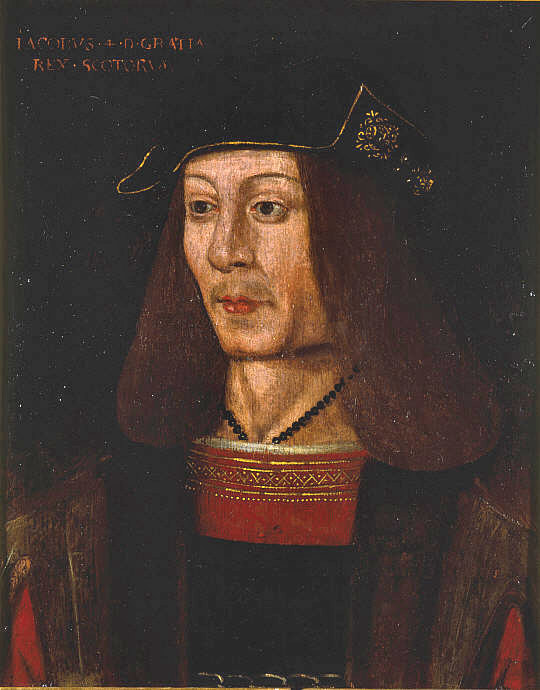
James IV of Scotland

- January – Hans Folz, German author (b. c. 1437)
- January 20 – Helena of Moscow, Grand Duchess consort of Lithuania and queen consort of Poland (b. 1476)
- February 20 – King John of Denmark, Norway, and Sweden (b. 1455)
- February 21 – Pope Julius II (b. 1443)
- March 10 – John de Vere, 13th Earl of Oxford, English general (b. 1443)
- April 24 – Şehzade Ahmet, oldest son of Sultan Bayezid II (executed) (b. 1465)
- April 30 – Edmund de la Pole, 3rd Duke of Suffolk, Duke of Suffolk (b. 1471)
- August 3 – Ernst II of Saxony, Archbishop of Magdeburg (1476–1513) and Administrator of Halberstadt (b. 1464)
- September 9 (killed at the Battle of Flodden)
  - James IV of Scotland (b. 1473)
  - George Douglas, Master of Angus (b. 1469)
  - William Douglas of Glenbervie (b. 1473)
  - William Graham, 1st Earl of Montrose, Scottish politician (b. 1464)
  - George Hepburn, Scottish bishop
  - Adam Hepburn, 2nd Earl of Bothwell, Scottish politician, Lord High Admiral of Scotland
  - Adam Hepburn of Craggis
  - David Kennedy, 1st Earl of Cassilis, Scottish soldier (b. 1478)
  - Alexander Lauder of Blyth, Scottish politician
  - Alexander Stewart, Scottish archbishop (b. 1493)
  - Matthew Stewart, 2nd Earl of Lennox, Scottish politician (b. 1488)
- October 27 – George Manners, 11th Baron de Ros, English nobleman
- date unknown
  - Claudine de Brosse, duchess Consort of Savoy (b. 1450)
  - Hua Sui, Chinese inventor and printer (b. 1439)

1514

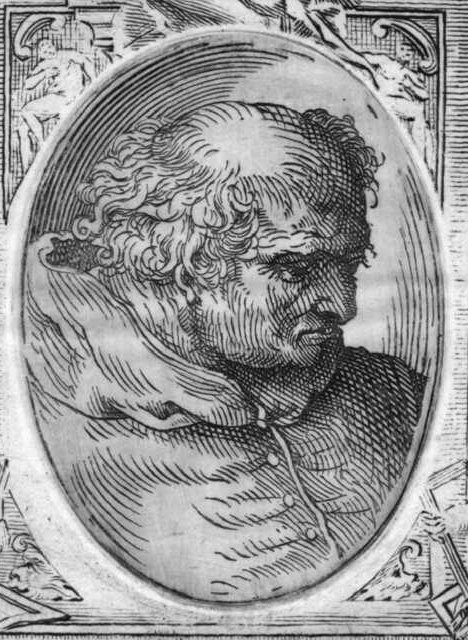
Donato Bramante

- January 2 – William Smyth, English bishop and statesman (b. 1460)
- January 9 – Anne of Brittany, queen of Charles VIII of France and Louis XII of France (b. 1477)
- March 11 – Donato Bramante, Italian architect (b. 1444)
- April 21 – Ichijō Fuyuyoshi, Japanese court noble (b. 1465)
- May 3 – Anna of Brandenburg, Duchess consort of Schleswig and Holstein (b. 1487)
- June 23 – Henry IV, Duke of Brunswick-Lüneburg (b. 1463)
- June 25 – Suster Bertken Dutch anchorite (b. 1426)
- July 20 – György Dózsa, Transylvanian peasant revolt leader (b. 1470)
- October 21 – Alexander, Count Palatine of Zweibrücken and Count of Veldenz (1489–1514) (b. 1462)
- October 25 – William Elphinstone, Scottish bishop and statesman (b. 1431)
- November 28 – Hartmann Schedel, German cartographer (b. 1440)
- date unknown
  - Agnes Fingerin, German philanthropist and businessperson

1515

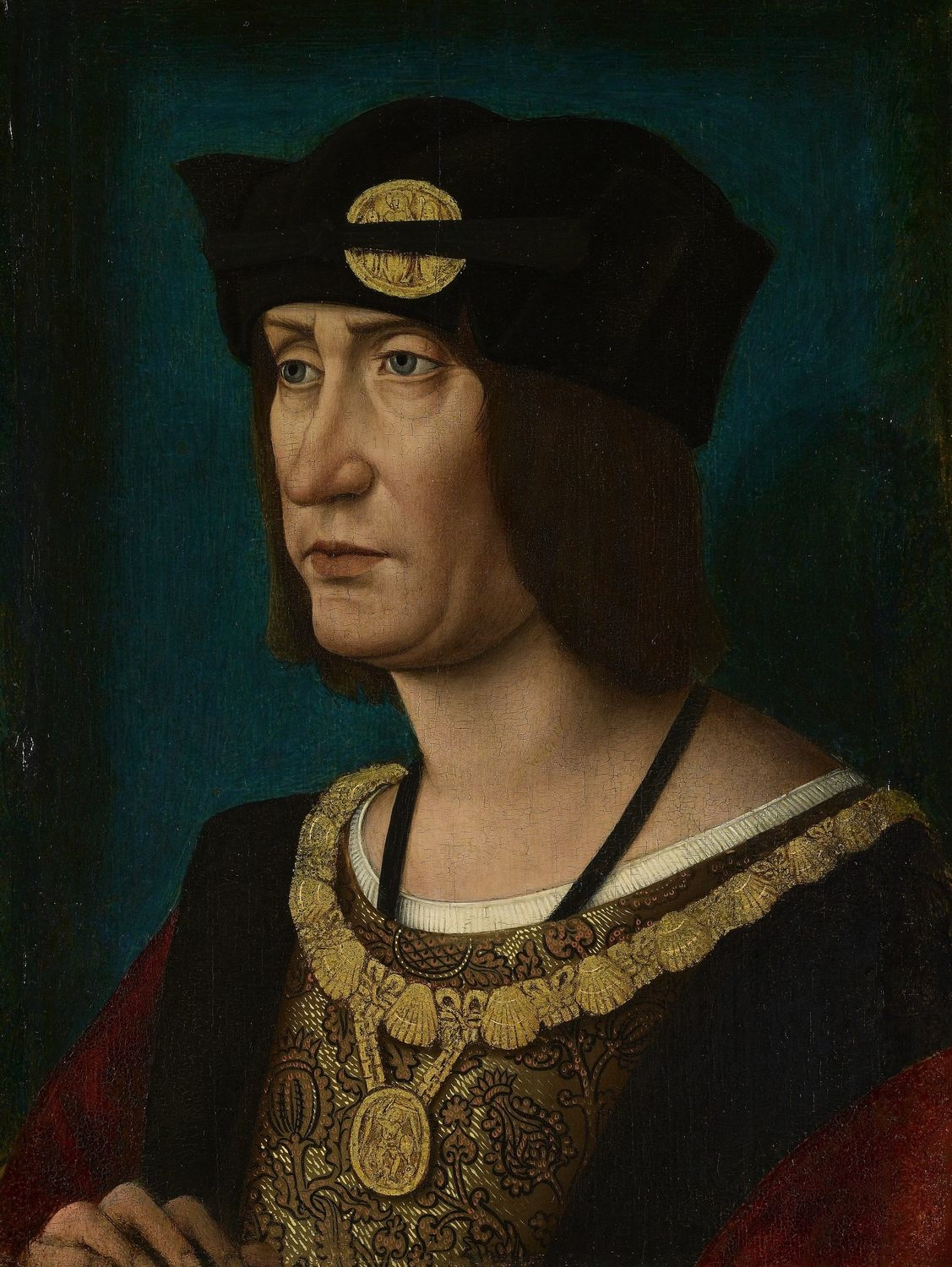
King Louis XII of France

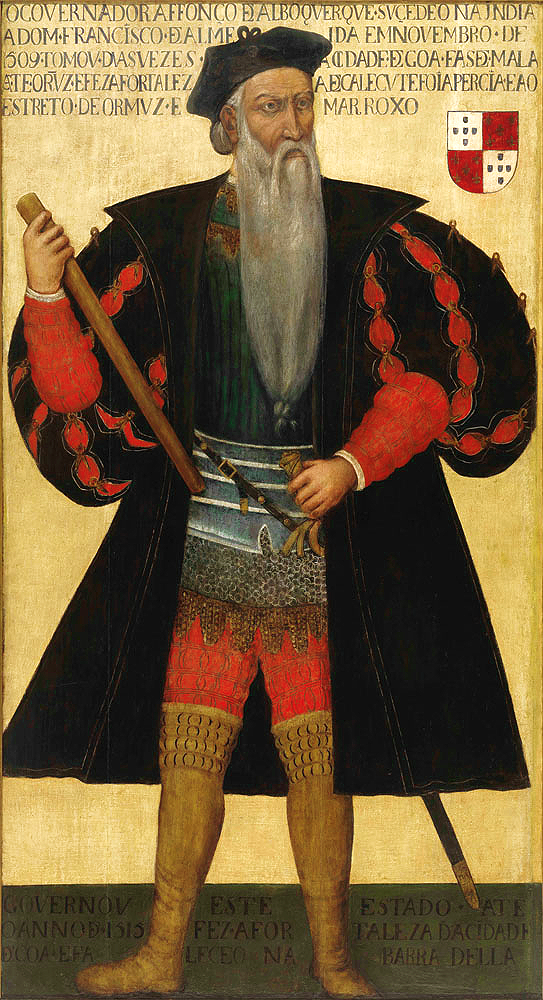
Afonso de Albuquerque

- January 1 – King Louis XII of France (b. 1462)
- February 6 – Aldus Manutius, Venetian printer (b. c. 1449)
- March 16 – Queen Janggyeong, Korean royal consort (b. 1491)
- April 15 – Mikołaj Kamieniecki, Polish nobleman (szlachcic) and first Great Hetman of the Crown (b. 1460)
- June 13 – Alaüddevle Bozkurt, Bey of Anatolian Dulkadir
- September 4 – Barbara of Brandenburg, Bohemian queen (b. 1464)
- September 9 – Joseph Volotsky, caesaropapist ideologist of the Russian Orthodox Church
- October – Bartolomeo d'Alviano, Venetian general (b. 1455)
- November 5 – Mariotto Albertinelli, Italian painter (b. 1474)
- December 2 – Gonzalo Fernández de Córdoba, Spanish general and statesman (b. 1453)
- December 16 – Afonso de Albuquerque, Portuguese naval general (b. 1453)
- December 18 – Alexander Stewart, Duke of Ross, Scottish prince (b. 1514)
- date unknown
  - Giovanni Giocondo, Italian friar, architect and classical scholar (b. c. 1433 in Verona)
  - Eoghan Mac Cathmhaoil, Irish Bishop of Clogher since 1505
  - Meñli I Giray, khan of the Crimean Khanate (b. 1445)
  - Pietro Lombardo, Italian Renaissance sculptor and architect (b. 1435 in Carona (Ticino))
  - Nezahualpilli, Aztec philosopher (b. 1464)
  - Alonso de Ojeda, Spanish conquistador (b. 1466)
- probable
  - Vincenzo Foppa, Italian Renaissance painter (b. 1430)
  - Quilago, queen regnant of the Cochasquí in Ecuador (b. 1490)

1516

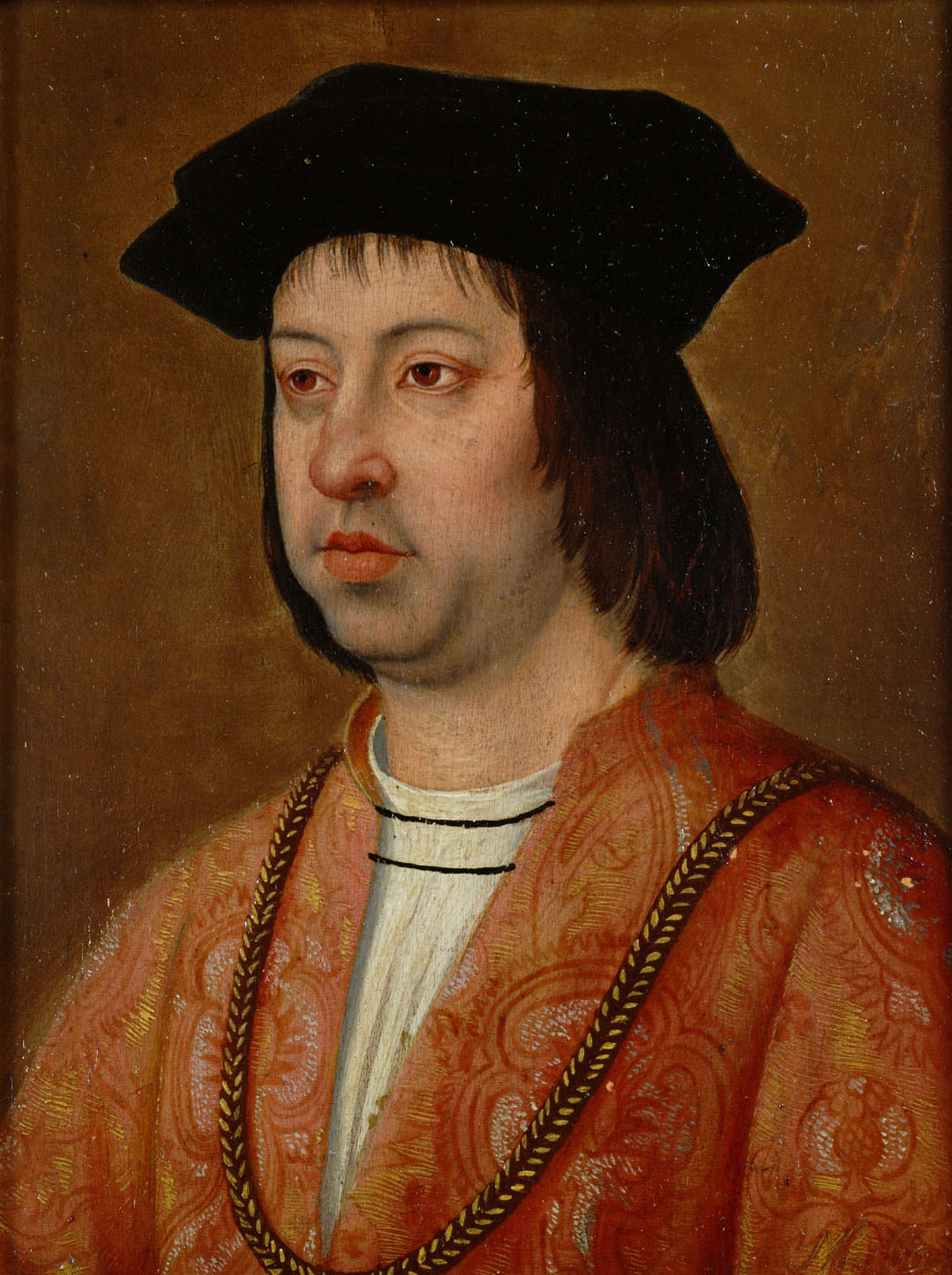
Ferdinand II of Aragon

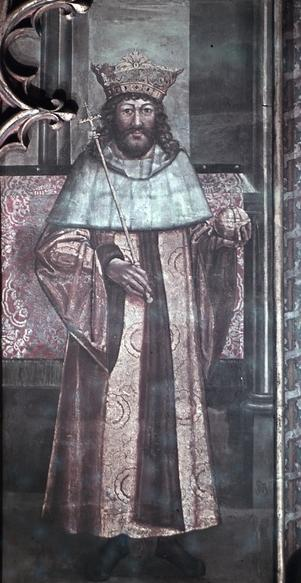
Vladislaus II of Bohemia and Hungary

- January 20 – Juan Díaz de Solís, Spanish navigator and explorer (b. 1470)
- January 23 – King Ferdinand II of Aragon (b. 1452)
- February 4 – Anthony of Supraśl, Polish Orthodox priest and saint
- March 13 – Vladislaus II, king of Bohemia, Hungary and Croatia (b. 1456)
- March 17 – Giuliano de' Medici, Duke of Nemours, ruler of Florence (b. 1449)
- April 25 – John Yonge, English diplomat (b. 1467)
- June 14 – King John III of Navarre (b. 1469)
- July 10 – Alice FitzHugh, English heir (b. 1448)
- July 30 – John V, Count of Nassau-Siegen, German count (b. 1455)
- August 9 (bur.) – Hieronymus Bosch, Dutch painter (b. 1450)
- August 21 – John III of Egmont, Dutch count (b. 1438)
- August 24 – Al-Ashraf Qansuh al-Ghuri, Mamluk sultan (b. c. 1441)
- October 30 – Louis Malet de Graville, Admiral of France, politician, military leader and art patron (b. c. 1440).
- November 26 – Giovanni Bellini, Venetian painter (b. 1430)
- December 13 – Johannes Trithemius, German scholar and cryptographer (b. 1462)
- date unknown – Giuliano da Sangallo, Florentine sculptor and architect (b. 1443)

1517

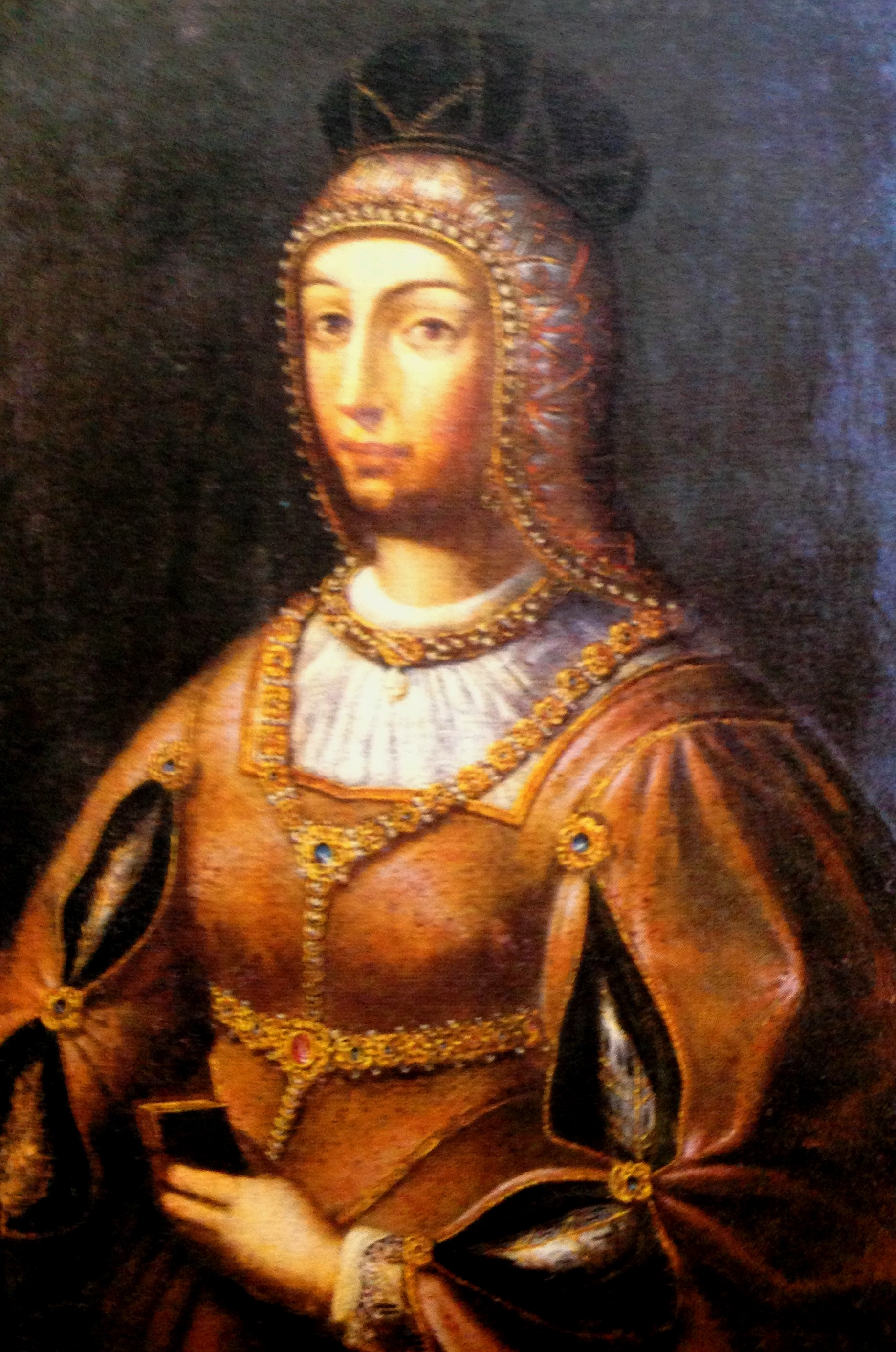
Maria of Aragon, Queen of Portugal

- January 5 – Francesco Raibolini, Italian painter (b. c. 1450)
- January 7 – Joanna of Aragon, Queen of Naples (b. 1454)
- January 22 – Hadım Sinan Pasha, Ottoman grand vizier (b. 1459)
- March 7 – Maria of Aragon, Queen of Portugal (b. 1482)
- March 26 – Heinrich Isaac, Flemish composer (b. c. 1450)
- April 14 – Tuman bay II, last Mamluk sultan of Egypt (b. c. 1476)
- June 19 – Luca Pacioli, Mathematician, collaborator with Leonardo da Vinci and 'father of accounting' (b. c. 1447)
- September 13 – Yunus Pasha, Grand Vizier of the Ottoman Empire
- September 21 – Dyveke Sigbritsdatter, mistress of Christian II of Denmark (b. 1490)
- September 24 – Frederick IV of Baden, Dutch bishop (b. 1455)
- October 31 – Fra Bartolomeo, Italian artist (b. 1472)
- November 6 – Wiguleus Fröschl of Marzoll, Bishop of Passau (1500–1517) (b. 1445)
- November 8 – Francisco Jiménez de Cisneros, Spanish Catholic cardinal and statesman (b. 1436)
- date unknown
  - Badi' al-Zaman, Timurid ruler of Herat
  - Francisco Hernández de Córdoba, Spanish conquistador
  - Marcus Musurus, Greek scholar and philosopher (b. 1470)
- probable
  - Gaspar van Weerbeke, Dutch composer (b. 1445)

1518

- February 9 – Jean IV de Rieux, Breton noble and Marshal (b. 1447)
- May 31 – Elisabeth of Brandenburg-Ansbach-Kulmbach, German margravine (b. 1494)
- July 10 – Sibylle of Baden, Countess consort of Hanau-Lichtenberg (b. 1485)
- August 16 – Loyset Compère, French composer (b. c. 1445)
- August 27 – Joan of Naples, queen consort of Naples (b. 1478)
- November 20
  - Marmaduke Constable, English soldier (b. c. 1455)
  - Pierre de La Rue, Flemish composer (b. c. 1452)
- November 24 – Vannozza dei Cattanei, mistress of Pope Alexander VI (b. 1442)
- December – Moxammat Amin of Kazan, khan of Kazan (b. c. 1469)
- December 5 – Gian Giacomo Trivulzio, Italian military commander (b. c. 1440)
- December 27 – Mahmood Shah Bahmani II, sultan of the Bahmani Sultanate (b. c. 1470)
- date unknown
  - Kabir, Indian mystic (b. 1440)
  - Oruç Reis, Ottoman corsair, brother of Hayreddin Barbarossa
  - Guido Mazzoni, sculptor (b. c. 1445)
  - Muhammad ibn Azhar ad-Din, sultan of Adal (assassinated) (b. c. 1473)
  - Basil Solomon, Syriac Orthodox Maphrian of the East.

1519

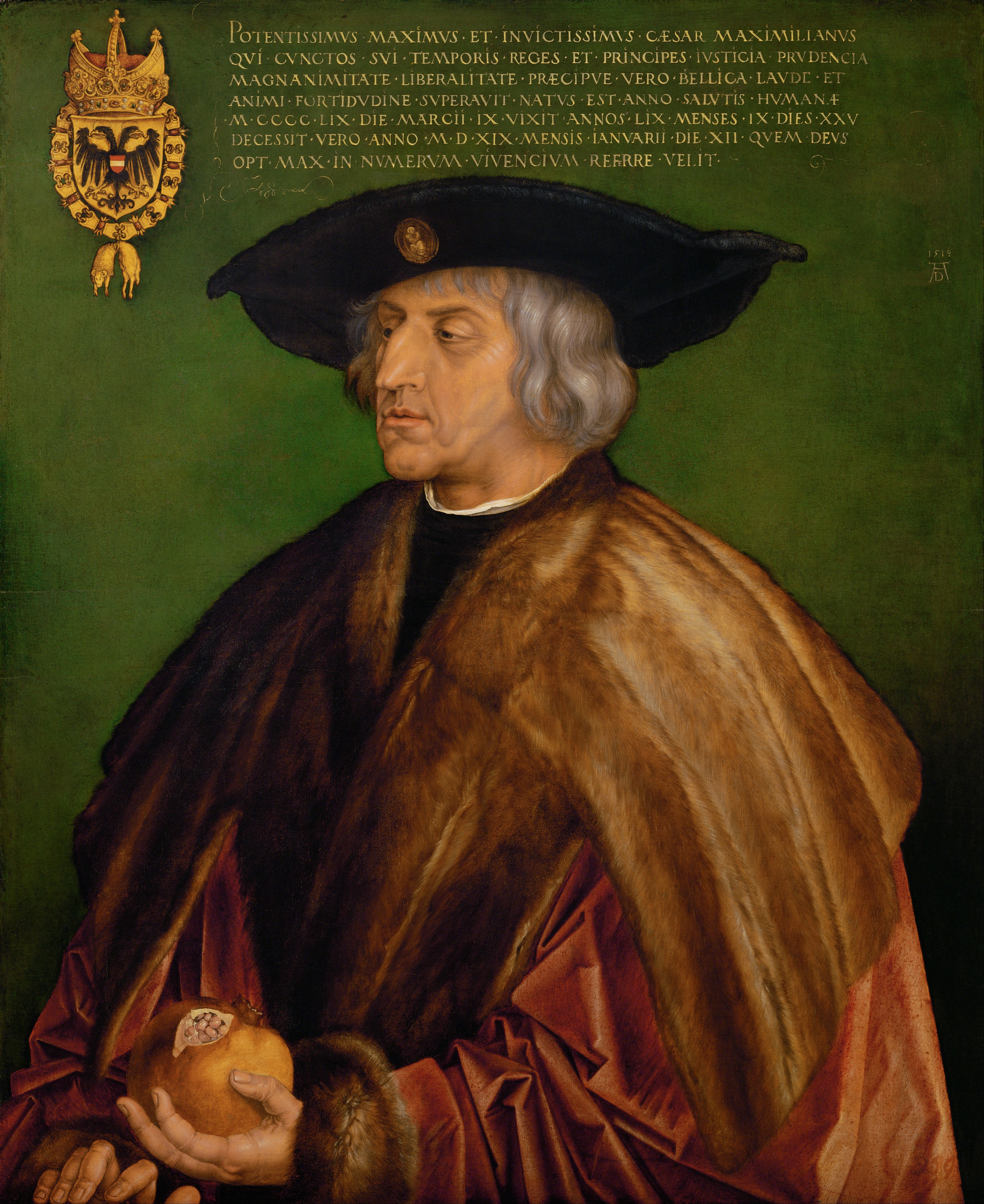
Maximilian I, Holy Roman Emperor

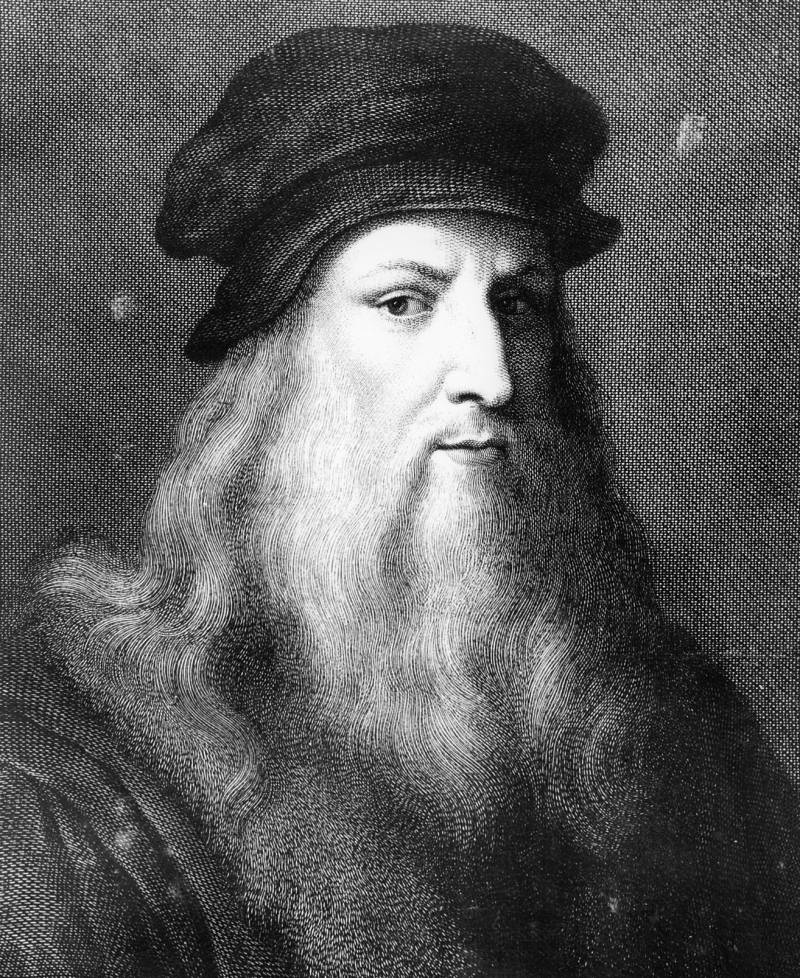
Leonardo da Vinci

- January 12
  - Maximilian I, Holy Roman Emperor (b. 1459)
  - Vasco Núñez de Balboa, Spanish explorer (b. 1475)
- February 6 – Lorenz von Bibra, Prince-Bishop of the Bishopric of Würzburg (b. 1459)
- March 29 – Francesco II Gonzaga, Marquess of Mantua (b. 1466)
- April 15 – Henry, Count of Württemberg-Montbéliard (1473–1482) (b. 1448)
- April 18 – Sibylle of Bavaria, Electress Palatine consort (b. 1489)
- May 2 – Leonardo da Vinci, Italian inventor and artist (b. 1452)
- May 4 – Lorenzo de' Medici, Duke of Urbino (b. 1492)
- May 13 – Artus Gouffier, Lord of Boissy, French nobleman and politician (b. 1475)
- June 2 – Philippe de Luxembourg, French Catholic cardinal (b. 1445)
- June 24 – Lucrezia Borgia, Duchess of Ferrara (b. 1480)
- July 13 – Zhu Youyuan, Ming dynasty politician (b. 1476)
- July 27 – Zanobi Acciaioli, librarian of the Vatican (b. 1461)
- August 11 – Johann Tetzel, German opponent of the Reformation (b. 1465)
- August 23 – Philibert Berthelier, Swiss patriot (b. c. 1465)
- September – John Colet, English churchman and educator (b. 1467)
- date unknown
  - William Grocyn, English scholar (b. 1446)
  - Ambrosius Holbein, German painter (b. 1494)
