= 1450s =

Decade

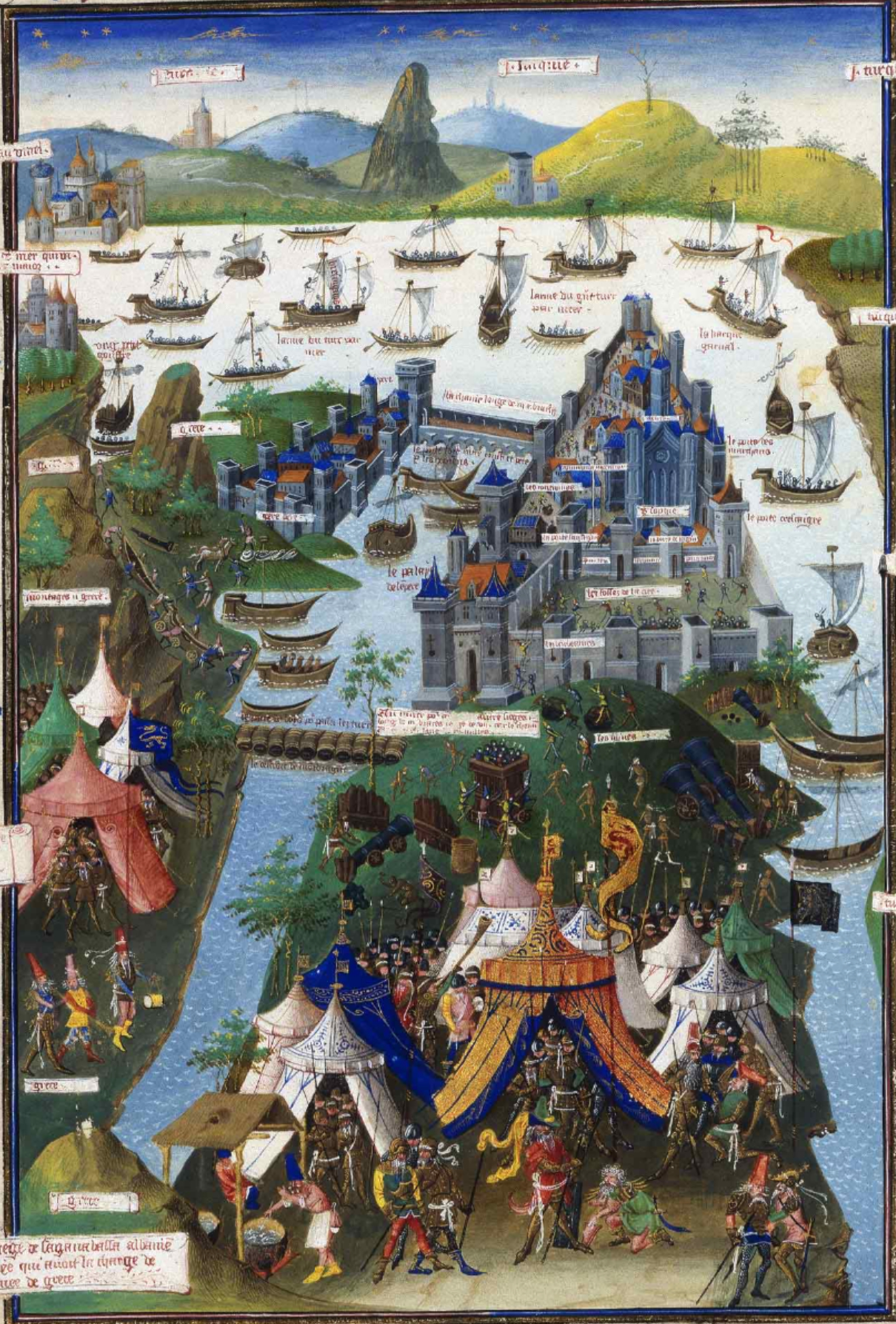
The Fall of Constantinople in 1453 marks the end of the Byzantine Empire and over two thousand years straight of Roman civilization.

The 1450s decade ran from January 1, 1450, to December 31, 1459.

== Events ==
=== 1450 ===
==== January–March ====
- January 19 – The Jingtai Era begins in China under the Emperor Daizong, and the Zhengtong Era ends after 14 years.
- January 19 – King James II of Scotland gives royal assent to numerous acts passed by the Scottish Parliament in 1449, including the Leases Act 1449 ("Of takis of landis for termes and takis of wedset (mortgaged) landis eftir the oute quyting of the lande"), the Coinage Act, the Parties Summoned to King's Council Act and the Statute Law Revision Act ("Persons chosyn of the thre estatis til examyn the actis of parliamentis and general counsallis").
- February 7 – John de la Pole, 2nd Duke of Suffolk, marries Lady Margaret Beaufort.
- February 26 – Francesco Sforza enters Milan after a siege, becoming Duke of the city-state, and founding a dynasty that will rule Milan for a century.
- March 10 – Colonization of Terceira Island by Portugal begins as Dom Henrique, om Navigador (known in English accounds as "Prince Henry the Navigator" assigns jurisdiction to Jácome de Bruges.
- March 11 – The First Margrave War comes to an end in Germany as Albrecht III Achilles, Elector of Brandenburg, is defeated by Nuremberg troops a t the battle of Pillenreuther Reiher.
- March 15 – English commander Thomas Kyriell and 2,500 soldiers land at Cherbourg in English-occupied France, where they join another 1,800 English troops recruited by the Duke of Somerset from the garrisons at Bayeux, Caen and Vire.
- March 25 – Francesco I Sforza becomes the Duke of Milan, restoring the Duchy of Milan and bringing an end to the Golden Ambrosian Republic that had governed Milan.

==== April–June ====
- April 8 – At the Korean capital of Hanseong, Munjong of Joseon becomes the new King of Korea upon the death of his father, Sejong the Great.
- April 15 – The Battle of Formigny takes place as French troops under the Comte de Clermont defeat an English army under Sir Thomas Kyriel and Sir Matthew Gough, which was attempting to relieve Caen
- May 8 – Jack Cade's Rebellion: Kentishmen revolt against King Henry VI of England.
- May 9 – Abdal-Latif Mirza, a Timurid dynasty monarch, is assassinated.
- May 13 – Charles VIII of Sweden, also serving as Carl I of Norway, is declared deposed from the latter throne, in favor of Christian I of Denmark.
- June 5 – French troops under Guy de Richemont besiege Caen in English-occupied Normandy in France, attacking the fortress commanded by Edmund Beaufort, 1st Duke of Somerset.
- June 8 – The 17th English Parliament of King Henry VI closes. Royal assent is given to several acts, including a seven-year prohibition of importation of products from the Dutch provinces of Holland, Zealand and Brabant "until English cloth may be sold there."
- June 18 – Battle of Solefields (Sevenoaks): Jack Cade's rebels are driven from London by loyal troops.
- June 20 – The First Margrave War between Nuremberg and Brandenburg ends with the signing of a peace treaty at Bamberg. Under the treaty, Albrecht III Achilles, Elector of Brandenburg, is forced to return all lands that he had captured from Nuremberg.

==== July–September ====
- July 6 – Caen surrenders to the French.
- July 7 – The surviving rebels who had participated in Jack Cade's rebellion in England are pardoned by King Henry VI. Cade himself, who had adoped the alias "John Mortimer", is pardoned under that name until his identity is discovered. Cade himself is killed by Alexander Iden on July 12, after resisting arrest for treason. His corpse is given a mock trial at Newgate Prison and the body beheaded, then dragged through the streets of London and quartered, with the limbs being sent throughout the county of Kent, where the rebellion had started.
- August 2 – The coronation of Christian I of Denmark as King of Norway takes place at Trondheim.
- August 12 – Cherbourg, the last English territory in Normandy, surrenders to the French.
- August 29 – The Treaty of Bergen is signed by officials of Norway and Sweden to reunite the two kingdoms under the rule of King Christian I. Both Norway and Sweden retain self-government and their own governing bodies.
- September 5 – Three months after the close of the last session, King Henry VI summons the members of the English Parliament to assemble at Westminster on November 6.
- September 8 – Pietro di Campofregoso is elected as the new Doge of the Republic of Genoa following the abdication of his cousin, Lodovico di Campofregoso.
- September 19 – China's Emperor Yingzong returns to Beijing after having been held as a prisoner of war by the Mongols since September 1, 1449. Upon returning, he is held under house arrest in the Forbidden City along with his wife, the Empress Qian, on orders of his younger brother Emperor Daizong.

==== October–December ====
- October 5 – Jews are expelled from Lower Bavaria, by order of Duke Ludwig IX.
- November 3 – The University of Barcelona is founded by the grant of King Alfonso V of Aragon.
- November 6 – The 18th parliament of King Henry VI of England opens. Commons elects William Oldhall as its speaker.
- November 23 – First Siege of Krujë: Albanian troops are victorious, forcing an Ottoman army of approximately 100,000 men to retreat from Albania.
- December 23 – In Rome, the collapse of the Ponte Sant'Angelo, a bridge over the Via Giulia and the subsequent stampede combine to kill more than 300 people, most of whom were on a pilgrimage to the Holy See.

==== Date unknown ====
- Machu Picchu (Quechua: Machu Pikchu, "Old mountain"), a pre-Columbian Inca site located 2,400 meters (7,875 ft) above sea level, is believed to be under construction.
- A religious sacrifice of over a hundred children is performed around this time, outside of the ancient city of Chan Chan (near modern Trujillo), on the north coast of Peru.
- Johannes Gutenberg has set up his movable type printing press, as a commercial operation in Mainz, by this date.

=== 1451 ===
==== January–March ====
- January 7 – Pope Nicholas V issues a Papal Bull to establish The University of Glasgow; classes are initially held in Glasgow Cathedral.
- January 27 – The Saxon Brother War between Frederick II, Elector of Saxony and William III, Landgrave of Thuringia is ended as two brothers sign a peace treaty at Naumburg.
- February 3 – Murad II, Sultan of the Ottoman Empire, dies and is succeeded (on February 18) by his son, Mehmed II.
- February 14 – Louis XI marries Charlotte of Savoy.
- March 26 – The Treaty of Gaeta is signed at the Italian city of Gaeta between the Kingdom of Albania (represented by Nikollë de Berguçi and Stefan, Bishop of Krujë on behalf of Skanderbeg, and the Kingdom of Naples (by King Alfonso. In return for protection of Albania from the Ottoman Empire, Albania agrees to be a vassal of Naples.

==== April–June ====
- April 11 – Celje acquires market town status and town rights, by orders from Count Frederic II of Celje.
- April 19 – In the Delhi Sultanate, the Afghan Lodi Dynasty succeeds the Turkish Sayyid Dynasty as the Sayyid ruler Ala-ud-Din Alam Shah flees Delhi and Bahlul Khan Lodi takes the throne.
- May 30 – (New moon (15th waning) of Nayon 813 ME) At Pegu (now in Myanmar, Binnya Waru, ruler of the Hanthawaddy kingdom, is assassinated by his cousin, Binnya Kyan.
- May 31 – King Henry VI of England gives royal assent to the Attainder of John Cade Act 1450, confiscating the lands of Jack Cade, who had led a rebellion against the King in 1450. Cade is posthumously convicted of treason so that his estate will go directly to the King.
- June 30 – French troops under Jean de Dunois invade Guyenne, and capture Bordeaux.

==== July–September ====
- July 31 – Jacques Coeur, accused of poisoning Agnes Sorel, mistress of King Charles VII of France, is arrested on the orders of the king and his large fortune is confiscated.
- August 14 – A three-year truce is signed between Scotland and England at the Church of St Nicholas at Newcastle-upon-Tyne.
- August 20 – The French capture Bayonne, the last English stronghold in Guyenne.
- September 10 – The Ottoman Empire renews its treaty with Republic of Venice and, on September 20, a truce with the Kingdom of Hungary.

==== October–December ====
- October 17 – After assassinating Bogdan II of Moldavia, Petru Aron takes up the throne.
- October 22 – Janos Hunyadi, Regent-Governor of the Kingdom of Hungary during the minority of the 11-year-old king, Ladislaus V, signs a peace treaty with the Holy Roman Emperor, Friedrich III.
- October 28 – Revolt of Ghent: Ghent takes up arms against Philip the Good, Duke of Burgundy.
- November 20 – Janos Hunyadi, Regent-Governor of the Kingdom of Hungary during the minority of the 11-year-old king, Ladislaus V, signs a 3-year truce with the Ottoman Empire.
- November 28 – At the Korean capital, Hanseong, Hwangbo In becomes the Chief State Councillor (Yeonguijeong) of the Kingdom of Korea as leader of the governing State Council, second in status only to King Munjong, replacing Ha Yeon.
- December 22 – (28 Zilhicce 855 AH) In Mamluk ruled Egypt, the Amir Asanbay al-Jamali al-Zahiri returns from a trip to the Ottoman Empire with a group of Ottoman diplomats, and the Mamluk Sultan Mehmed II hosts them at a banquet, granting them a private audience the next day. The Ottomans depart on January 17.

==== Date unknown ====
- Skennenrahawi, the Great Peacemaker, a chief Mohawk people, founds the Haudenosaunee, commonly called the Iroquois Confederacy, along with Jigonhsasee and Hiawatha. The Haudenosaunee is initially a political and cultural union of five Iroquoian-speaking Native American tribes (the Mohawk, Oneida, Onondaga, Cayuga, and Seneca) governing parts of the present-day state of New York, northern Pennsylvania, and the eastern portion of the provinces of Ontario, and Quebec.

=== 1452 ===
==== January–March ====
- January 19 – In Mongolia, Taisun Khan, the reigning khagan of the Northern Yuan dynasty, is killed while fleeing after a defeat at Turfan in a war with Esen Taishi. Taisun's younger brother, Agbarjin, becomes the new khagan.
- February 22 – William Douglas, 8th Earl of Douglas is killed by James II of Scotland, at Stirling Castle.
- February – Alexăndrel retakes the throne of Moldavia, in his long struggle with Petru Aron.
- March 17 – Reconquista – Battle of Los Alporchones (around the city of Lorca in Murcia): The combined forces of the Kingdom of Castile, and its subsidiary kingdom of Murcia, defeat the Emirate of Granada.
- March 19 – Frederick III, Holy Roman Emperor, becomes the last to be crowned in Rome.
- March 31 – In an attempt to end the rebellion in Ghent, Philip the Good, Duke of Burgundy, declares war against the Ghentenaar rebels.

==== April–June ====
- April 27 – George of Poděbrady is elected as regent of Bohemia until King Ladislaus of Hungary reaches the age of majority.
- May 2 – Jean Bréhal, chief of the French inquisition, reopens the case of Joan of Arc, who had been executed more than 20 years earlier for heresy and begins taking testimony from witnesses.
- May 4 – Pope John XI of Alexandria, leader of the Coptic Christian church since 1427, dies, leaving a vacancy in the Coptic papacy.
- May 18 – The Battle of Brechin is fought in Scotland between the royalist supporters of Clan Gordon (led by Alexander Gordon, 1st Earl of Huntly) and the rebels of Clan Lindsay, led by Alexander Lindsay, 4th Earl of Crawford. Clan Gordon wins and the Lindsays submit to the authority of King James II.
- May 20 – China's Emperor Daizhong, brother of the former emperor Yingzong, designates his son as the new heir to the throne, demoting Daizhong's son Zhu Jianshen and placing his own son, Zhu Janji, as next in line for the throne.
- June 18 – Pope Nicholas V issues the bull Dum Diversas, legitimising the colonial slave trade.

==== July–September ====
- July 21 – The League of God's House signs a peace treaty with the counts of Ortenstein in the Swiss Canton of Graubünden to fund the rebuilding of Ortenstein Castle, as long as they promise never to use the castle against the League.
- July 26 – The University of Valence is founded in France by the Dauphin Louis, son of King Charles VII. The university lasts for 330 years until being closed during the French Revolution.
- August 10 (25th day of 7th month of Hōtoku 4 – The Kyōtoku era is proclaimed in Japan during the reign of the Emperor Go-Hanazono.
- September 14 – Serbian General Thomas Kantakouzenos leads troops in an invasion of the Principality of Zeta but is driven back by the Prince of Zeta, Stefan Crnojević.
- September 23 – Pope Matthew II of Alexandria is elected as the new Patriarch of the Coptic Christian Church, succeeding Pope John XI, who died on May 4.

==== October–December ====
- October 17 – English troops under John Talbot, 1st Earl of Shrewsbury, land in Guyenne, in France, in order to recapture and retake most of the Guyenne province.
- October 23 – The Earl of Shrewsbury and his army capture Bordeaux, capital of Gascony, after having taken back most of the province without resistance.
- October – Byzantine–Ottoman Wars: The Ottoman governor of Thessaly, Turakhan Beg, breaks through the Hexamilion wall for the fourth time, and ravages the Peloponnese Peninsula to prevent the Byzantine Despotate of the Morea from assisting Constantinople, during the final Ottoman siege of the imperial capital.
- November 23 – The Canton of Appenzell becomes an associate member of the Swiss Confederacy. Full membership will be granted more than 50 years later in 1513.
- December 12 – Isidore of Kiev, the Latin Patriarch of Constantinople, proclaims the union of the Greek and Latin churches at the Hagia Sophia in hopes of an alliance with Western Christians to prevent the loss of Consttantinople to the Ottoman Turks.

==== Date unknown ====
- A major volcanic eruption, 1452/1453 mystery eruption, has a subsequent global cooling effect (the eruption releases more sulfate than any other event in the previous 700 years).
- Portuguese navigator Diogo de Teive discovers the islands of Corvo and Flores, in the Azores.
- Battle of Bealach nam Broig, a Scottish clan battle.
- Edinburgh officially becomes the capital of the Kingdom of Scotland.

=== 1454 ===
==== January–March ====
- January 6 – Mehmed II, the Muslim Sultan of the Ottoman empire, restores the Christian Ecumenical Orthodox Patriarchate of Constantinople, and appoints the Byzantine Greek theologian Gennadius Scholarius as the Patriarch Gennadius II.
- February 4 – The cause of the Thirteen Years' War is set when the Secret Council of the Prussian Confederation sends a formal act of disobedience to the Grand Master, and the citizens of Toruń rebel against the Teutonic Knights, beginning the conflict.
- March 6 – Casimir IV of Poland renounces allegiance to the Teutonic Knights and the Prussian Confederation pledges its allegiance to him.
- March 27 – Richard Plantagenet, Duke of York, becomes Protector for King Henry VI of England, who is in a catatonic state.

==== April–June ====
- April 9 – Treaty of Lodi: Francesco Sforza forms a triple alliance between the Duchy of Milan, the Republic of Florence and Kingdom of Naples.
- May 8 – Catalan Grimaldi becomes the new Lord of Monaco upon the death of his father, Jean I Grimaldi.
- May 28 – King Casimir IV of Poland receives an oath of allegiance from the citizens of Toruń and other cities in the Chelmno area.
- June 11 – In Poland, the landholders and bishops of Eblag pledge allegiance to King Casimir IV, and Gdańsk follows on June 16.
- June 13 –
  - The canton of St. Gallen is accepted as an associate state of the Swiss Confederation.
  - Ulrich II, Count of Celje becomes the new Ban of Slavonia upon the death of his father, Frederick II.
- June 19 – In Poland, Królewiec (now Kaliningrad in Russia) pledges its allegiance to Casimir IV with the city's Chancellor, Jan Taszka Koniecpolski, delivering the oath on behalf of the estates and cities of Lower Prussia.

==== July–September ====
- July 12 – Within the Duchy of Pomerania in Germany, the Hanseatic League town of Stralsund ends its resistance to the Pomeranian dukes and enters into a peace agreement.
- July 21 – At Valladolid, Enrique IV is proclaimed as the new King of Castile on the day after the death of his father, King Juan II.
- July 31 – In France, the rebel Pierre II de Montferrand, former Governor of Baye, is beheaded, drawn and quartered after his July 14 conviction for treason. Shortly afterward, Montferrand is beheaded, then drawn and quartered.
- August 22 – In Moldavia, Petru Aron retakes the throne from Alexăndrel.
- August 26 – At Elbistan, capital of the principality of Dulkadir, Malik Arslan becomes the new ruler upon the death of his father, Suleiman of Dulkadir.
- August 30 – The Italic League is concluded in Venice as an alliance between the Republic of Venice, the Papal States, the Duchy of Milan, the Republic of Florence, and the Kingdom of Naples.
- September 18 – Thirteen Years' War – Battle of Chojnice: The Polish army is defeated by a smaller but more professional Teutonic army.
- September 24 – At the Battle of Leskovac, Nikola Skobaljić, voivode of Dubočica, defeats Ottoman Turks invading Serbia.

==== October–December ====
- October 2 – At the Battle of Kruševac, the Serbian Army, commanded by General Skobaljić with the assistance of troops from John Hunyadi and Đurađ Branković, destroys Ottoman invaders commanded by Feriz Beg.
- October 9 – Thirteen Years' War: The Malbork treaty is concluded between the authorities of the Teutonic Order and the mercenary forces fighting for the Teutonic Order.
- November 16 – Nikola Skobaljić, the Serbian voivode of Dubočica who had resisted Ottoman rule, is defeated by the armies of the Ottoman Sultan Mehmed II and is taken prisoner. Skobaljić is executed by impalement at the Mehmed's command, and his head is sent to Constantinople to serve as an example of the punishment for people who resist the Ottoman Sultan.
- December 12 (Julian calendar, December 21 Gregorian) – (24th day of 11th month of Kyotuku 3) An earthquake estimated by geologists at 8.4 magnitude strikes off the east coast of Japan and causes a tsunami that kills an indeterminate number of people in the Kantō region and the Tōhoku region.
- December – King Henry VI of England having regained his sanity dismisses the Duke of York as Protector.

==== Date unknown ====
- The press of Johannes Gutenberg (at Mainz on the Rhine) produces the first printed documents bearing a date.
- Isaac Zarfati sends a circular letter to Rhineland, Swabia, Moravia and Hungary, praising the happy conditions of the Jews under the crescent, in contrast to the "great torture chamber" under the cross, and urging them to come to the Ottoman Empire.
- The Statutes of Nieszawa are enacted in Poland.
- The Drought of One Rabbit is recorded in Aztec history.

=== 1455 ===
==== January–March ====
- January 8 – Pope Nicholas V publishes Romanus Pontifex, an encyclical addressed to King Afonso V of Portugal, which sanctions the conquest of non-Christian lands, and the reduction of native non-Christian populations to 'perpetual slavery'. (Later there will be a dramatic reversal when, in 1537, the bull Sublimis Deus of Pope Paul III forbids the enslavement of non-Christians.)
- February 23 – The Gutenberg Bible is the first book printed with movable type.
- February 24 – Alexăndrel of Moldavia retakes the position of Prince of Moldavia after forcing out Petru Aron.
- March 2 – After an agreement reached in Venice on August 30, the Italic League (Lega Italica) comes into being as a 25-year truce and mutual defense agreement between the Republic of Venice, the Papal States, the Duchy of Milan, the Republic of Florence, and the Kingdom of Naples.
- March 22 – Portuguese explorer and slave trader Alvise Cadamosto and a crew commanded by Vicente Dias depart from Porto Santo on the first of two voyages down the coast of West Africa and reaches the Gambia River before being forced to turn back by the crew.
- March 24 – (6th waxing of Tagu 816 ME Burmese kings Min Khayi of Arakan and Narapati of Ava meet in a summit near Minbu at Natyegan Hill.

==== April–June ====
- April 4 – The papal conclave to replace the late Pope Nicholas V begins. For the first time, the conclave is held at the Apostolic Palace in Rome. In the first rounds of ballots, the two front-running candidates are Cardinal Latino Orsini and Cardinal Prospero Colonna, and Colonna receives a plurality of votes, but not the required two-thirds majority.
- April 8 – Cardinal Alfons de Borja is elected as the 209th Roman Catholic pontiff and takes the name Pope Calixtus III.
- May 1 – Battle of Arkinholm: Forces loyal to King James II of Scotland defeat the supporters of the Earl of Douglas.
- May 22 – The Wars of the Roses begin in England at the Battle of St Albans, as Richard, Duke of York, captures King King Henry VI as a prisoner of war.
- May 25 – Petru Aron retakes the position of Prince of Moldavia after forcing Prince Alexăndrel (who had taken the throne from him on February 24) to flee the country.
- June 1 – Novo Brdo, the last defense of Serbia, falls to the Ottoman Turks after a siege of 40 days. All high ranking Serbian officials are executed and younger men and boys are taken captive to serve in the Ottoman Army, while 700 women and girls are taken as wives by Ottoman commanders.
- June 3 – Saint Vincent Ferrer is canonized 36 years after his death by Pope Callixtus III in a ceremony at the Dominican church of Santa Maria sopra Minerva in Rome.
- June 15 – In Egypt, the Sultan Sayf al-Din Inal confronts a revolt of 500 of his ethnic Circassian slave-troops (mamluks) after rejecting the soldiers' requests for camels to accompany them on an expedition against Bedouin invaders in the Nile Delta. After attempting to assassinate the Sultan's secretary, Yunus al-Aqba'i, the rebels join discontented Zahiri troops and besieged the Cairo Citadel. Facing a withdrawal of support from the Egyptian Caliph, the Sultan eventually meets the rebels' demands.
- June 21 – In what is now the nation of Kosovo, the city of Prizren is captured from the Serbian Despotate by the Ottoman Turkish invaders.
- June 25 – Prince João, the new son of King Afonso V of Portugal, is approved as the heir to the throne by the representatives of the three estates of the realm (nobility, clergy and bourgeoisie) in the Portuguese Cortes at Lisbon.

==== July–September ====
- July 4 – King Danjong of Korea, ruler since the death in 1452 of his father, King Munjong, is forced to abdicate. He is promoted to the figurehead post of King Emeritus (Sangyang).
- July 14 – In the Thirteen Years' War, the Teutonic Order wins the Battle for Kneiphof, though the Order will eventually lose with the signing of a treaty at Thorn.
- August 4 – Prince Sejo, son of the late King Sejong, becomes the new monarch of Korea in Hanseong following the forced abdication of King Danjong.
- September 8 – Pope Calixtus III decides to send Christians on a crusade against the Ottoman Empire in an attempt to recapture Constantinople. At a ceremony at St. Peter's Basilica in Rome, the Pope provides Cardinal Alain de Coëtivy with the crusader's cross and sends him on a mission to meet with King Charles VII of France in hopes of getting French support for the proposed crusade.
- September 15 – Ludwig von Erlichshausen, Grand Master of the Teutonic Order, signs the Treaty of Mewe, selling the Order's territory of the Neumark back to the Electorate of Brandenburg after having owned it for 34 years. Grand Master Ludwig had earlier "pawned" the territory to Brandenburg on February 22, 1454, in return for a loan approved by the Elector Frederick II.

==== October–December ====
- October 5 – Threatened with an invasion by the Ottoman Empire, the Principality of Moldavia sends its first tribute to the Ottoman Sultan, paying 2,000 ducats (equivalent to 6.99 kilograms (15.4 lb) of gold) in response to an ultimatum.
- November 15 – The conflict between Vladislav II of Wallachia and John Hunyadi escalates, so the latter decides to support Vlad the Impaler for the throne of Wallachia, the following year.
- December 15 – At the Battle of Clyst Heath, part of the Bonville–Courtenay feud fought during the Wars of the Roses, Thomas Courtenay, Earl of Devon defeats the Baron William Bonville. Bonville had made the attack after the October 23 murder of his councillor, the lawyer Nicholas Radford.

=== 1456 ===
==== January–March ====
- January 6 – After two years as Ecumenical Patriarch of Constantinople, the Eastern Orthodox Christian partriarch in the Islamic Ottoman Empire, Gennadius Scholarius resigns, and Isidore II is elected to replace him.
- January 24 – After Dorino II Gattilusio seizes ownership of the Greek mainland harbor of Ainos and the islands of Samothrace and Imbros, Ottoman Sultan Mehmed II orders a blockade the port with 10 ships and leads a ground invasion. After the surrender off Ainos, Mehmed II sends his Admiral Mirza Yunus Beg commences the take control of Samothrace and Imbros.
- February 25 –
  - The Treaty of Yazhelbitsy is signed between the Grand Principality of Moscow (led by Grand Prince Vasily II) and the Novgorod Republic (governed by Vasily Shuisky) with Vasily II becoming the Prince of Novgorod.
  - As King Henry VI of England recovers from a three-month bout with mental illness, Richard Plantagenet, Duke of York steps down as Protector of the Realm and the King resumes his duties. The Duke of York had served as regent since November 19, and had previously been Lord Protector for 10 months during 1454 and 1455.
- March 12 – After a session of eight months that had started on July 9, 1455, the English Parliament adjourns at Westminster. Royal assent is given by King Henry VI to bills passed, including the Importation Act 1455, banning the import for the next five years of woven silk goods (including ribbons and girdles) that had been manufactured outside of England, and subjecting importers to heavy fines. and the Embezzlement Act, allowing civil remedies by executors of estates to recover goods that had been stolen by servants from their masters.
- March 13 – The papal bull Inter caetera is issued by Pope Callixtus III, recognizing the rights of the Kingdom of Portugal to colonize any territories its explorers discover on the West African coast, and making the non-Christian natives of those colonies perpetual vassals of the King of Portugal.

==== April–June ====
- April 5 – Skanderbeg, leader of the Albanians in their fight against the Ottomans, pardons Moisi Galemi, a former officer who had defected to the Ottomans and was then defeated by Skanderbeg at the Battle of Oranik.
- May 18 – Second Battle of Oronichea (1456): Ottoman Forces of 15,000 are sent to capture Albania, but are met and swiftly defeated by Skanderbeg's smaller forces.
- June 9 – Halley's Comet makes an appearance, as noted by the humanist scholar Platina.

==== July–September ====
- July 7 – A retrial of Joan of Arc acquits her of heresy, 25 years after her execution.
- July 22 – At the Battle of Nándorfehérvár, the Hungarians under John Hunyadi rout the Turkish army of Sultan Mehmed II. The noon bell ordered by Pope Callixtus III commemorates the victory throughout the Christian world (and hence is still rung). Hunyadi dies two months later when a plague sweeps the Hungarian camp.
- July 29 – A treaty is signed at Toruń between the Kingdom of Poland and mercenaries led by Oldrzych Czerwonka with Poland purchasing the 21 fortresses of Czerwonka's people in exchange for 463,794 florins (1.62 million grams or 58,000 ounces of gold).
- August 20 – Vladislav II, reigning Prince of Wallachia, is killed in hand-to-hand combat by the former Prince, Vlad the Impaler, who succeeds him.
- September 15 – The Burgundian state, led by Prince Philip the Good, captures the rebel city of Deventer in the Netherlands after a 32-day siege that had been defended by Gijsbrecht van Brederode, Bishop of Utrecht.
- September 23 – Pope Calixtus III issues a papal bull granting a seven-year indulgence to any Christian who makes a pilgrimage to Our Lady of the Pillar in Zaragoza in Spain's Kingdom of Aragon

==== October–December ====
- October 17 – The University of Greifswald is established, making it the second oldest university in Northern Europe. Due to border changes, from 1648 to 1815 it is the oldest in Sweden, and from 1815 to 1945 the oldest in Prussia.
- November 9 – Ulrich II, Count of Celje, regent for King Ladislas of Hungary and governor of Slavonia, Croatia and Dalmatia, is assassinated the day after he had entered the fortress of Belgrade, apparently at the direction of Ladislaus Hunyadi, son of the late John Hunyadi.
- December 5 – A 7.4 magnitude earthquake (estimated subsequently by geologists), the first of two on the Italian peninsula, strikes near Pontelandolfo (at the time, part of the Papal States) at 11:00 at night and kills as many as 70,000 people.
- December 30 – A second earthquake strikes the Italian peninsula in the Kingdom of Naples at 9:30 p.m. and is estimated by geologists at 7.0 magnitude, followed by a 6.0 aftershock, and kills an indeterminate number of people.

==== Date unknown ====
- Lazar Branković becomes despot of Serbia.
- Alvise Cadamosto discovers some of the Cape Verde Islands.
- Diogo Gomes reaches the Geba River in Guinea Bissau, and explores the Gambia River.
- Emperor Zara Yaqob of Ethiopia founds the city of Debre Berhan.
- Muscovy and the Novgorod Republic conclude the Treaty of Yazhelbitsy.
- Petru Aron becomes the first ruler of Moldavia to pay tribute to the Ottomans.
- The fifth Mersenne prime, 8191, is discovered.

=== 1457 ===
==== January–March ====
- January 21 – Jan IV, Duke of Oświęcim, sells the duchy to the Kingdom of Poland.
- February 11 – In Ming dynasty China, the Emperor Yingzong of Ming is returned to the throne by General Cao Jixiang and other officers who had staged a coup d'etat and overthrown his brother, the Emperor Daizong. Yingzong, whose first reign was the Zhengtong era, proclaims the Tianshun era.
- February 24 – King Charles VIII of Sweden is declared deposed after fleeing from Stockholm to Danzig following a rebellion. The Archbishop of Sweden, Jöns Bengtsson Oxenstierna, and statesman Erik Axelsson Tott become co-regents of Sweden. The coup leaders then offer the throne to Christian I, King of Denmark and Norway.
- March 1 – Prince Zhu Jianshen is designated as the heir to the Chinese throne by his father, the Emperor Yingzong.
- March 6 – King James II of Scotland gives royal assent to laws passed by the Scottish Parliament, including several relating to the killing of various animals including rooks, crows and other birds of prey, as well as red fish, wolves, hares and rabbits Approval is also given for the Wapinschaws Act 1457 (regarding weapon shows, the required gathering of troops for review in each district four times a year) which makes the first written mention of the game of golf. The act declares that while archery is to be used at the gatherings, "the fut bal ande the golf are to be uterly cryt done and not usyt" ("football and golf are to be shouted down and not used", subject to arrest by the King's officers for violations.
- March 14 – Ladislaus Hunyadi, who had assassinated the Hungarian regent Ulrich of Celje on November 9, is arrested soon after being tricked by King Ladislaus V into believing that he would become Lord Treasurer and Captain-General upon his arrival in Budapest.Hunyadi is beheaded two days later by order of the King.
- March 25 – At the age of 11, Mirza Shah Mahmud briefly becomes the Sultan of the Timurid Empire upon the death at Mashhad of the Sultan Abul-Qasim Babur Mirza. Shah Mahmud is overthrown a few weeks later by his cousin Ibrahim Mirza.

==== April–June ====
- April 12 – Ştefan cel Mare secures the throne of Moldavia, which he retains for the next 47 years.
- May 15 – The Swiss city of St. Gallen becomes a free imperial city within the Holy Roman Emperor upon payment of 7,000 gulden to its former abbot, Kaspar von Breitenlandenberg.
- May 25 – The city of Gdańsk is granted full autonomy by King Casimir IV of Poland.
- June 23 – Christian I is elected king of Sweden, ending the war between Sweden and Denmark and restoring the Kalmar Union.
- June 29 – The Dutch city of Dordrecht is devastated by fire.

==== July–September ====
- July 21 – Former Korean King Danjong (who had been given a comfortable office as "King Emeritus") is arrested after having conspired to reclaim the throne of Korea from his uncle, King Sejo. The other six conspirators (Sŏng Sammun, Pak Paeng-nyeon, Ha Wi-ji, Yi Kae, Yu Ŭngbu, and Yu Sŏngwŏn) are executed, while Danjong is initially spared the death penalty.
- August 14 – The Mainz Psalter, the second major book printed with movable type in the West, the first to be wholly finished mechanically (including colour), and the first to carry a printed date, is printed for the Elector of Mainz.
- September 2 – At the Battle of Albulena, the Albanian general Skanderbeg's defeats Ottoman Empire army, in the open field.

==== October–December ====
- October 22 – After serving as the Doge of the Republic of Venice for 34 years, Francesco Foscari is forced to abdicate by the Council of Ten. Foscari dies 10 days later on November 1 at the age of 84.
- October 30 – Pasquale Malipiero is elected as the new Doge of Venice.
- November 23 – King Ladislaus V, King of Hungary, King of Croatia, and Duke of Austria since 1440, as well as King of Bohemia since 1453, dies suddenly at the age of 17 while in Prague. Although suspected by his allies to have been the victim of poisoning, examination of his remains indicates later that he died from bubonic plague. Frederick III, Holy Roman Emperor is declared Duke of Austria, while Matthias Corvinus attempts to become the new King of Hungary and Croatia, while George of Poděbrady vies to become the new King of Bohemia.
- December 23 – Pope Calixtus III declares Albanian hero Skanderbeg to be a Captain-General of the Holy See and gives him the title Athleta Christi ("Champion of Christ").

==== Date unknown ====
- Albrechts University is founded at Freiburg im Breisgau.
- Edo Castle is built by Ōta Dōkan in modern-day Tokyo.

=== 1458 ===
==== January–March ====
- January 24 – Matthias Corvinus becomes king of Hungary, at age 14.
- February 20 – Stefan Branković, blind since 1441, becomes the Despot of Serbia upon the death of his brother, Lazar Branković.
- February 27 – George of Poděbrady is elected king of Bohemia.
- March 25 – The Loveday is staged in London, by which Henry VI of England attempts to unite the warring factions who have triggered the Wars of the Roses.

==== April–June ====
- April 2 – George of Poděbrady (King Jiří z Poděbrad) receives the Crown of Saint Wenceslas at his coronation at the St. Vitus Cathedral in Prague as King of Bohemia.
- April 19 – In Bohemia, a group of Silesian princes and city rulers form an alliance against the new King, George of Podebrady. Within a year, the resistance is dropped and the Silesian princes pay homage to King George.
- April 20 – Isidore of Kiev is installed as the Latin Patriarchate of Constantinople, leader of Eastern Orthodox Christians in the Ottoman Empire, with the approval of the Muslim Ottoman Sultan, Mehmed II.
- May 6 – At Bidar in India, the Sultan of Bahmani, dies after a reign of 22 years and is succeeded by his son, Humayun Shah Zalim Bahmani.
- June 27 – Alfonso V of Aragon, King of Aragon in Spain since 1416 and King of Naples in Italy since 1442, dies at his home at the Castel dell'Ovo in Naples. By prior arrangement with his family, Alfonso is succeeded as King of Naples by his son, Fernando, popularly known in Naples as "Ferrante". At the same time, Alfonso's brother Juan, King of Navarre and King of Sicily, becomes the new King of Aragon.
- June – Francesco II Acciaioli, last Duke of Athens, surrenders the city to the Ottoman Empire and Sultan Mehmed II enters peacefully in August. Ottoman authorities issue a decree to protect the Acropolis.

==== July–September ====
- July 15 – Magdalen College, Oxford, is founded.
- August 6 – Pope Callixtus III dies after a reign of slightly more than three years.
- August 19 – The conclave to elect a new Pope concludes at the Apostolic Palace, with only 19 of the 27 members of the College of Cardinals participating. One of the electors, Cardinal Domenico Capranica appeared to be the most likely choice for Pope, but had died suddenly on August 14, two days before the conclave opened. On the first ballot on August 18, no candidate had more than five votes, but by the next day, Cardinal Enea Piccolomini, Archbishop of Siena, receives unanimous support after initially competing against Guillaume d'Estouteville and Filippo Calandrini. Piccoloni takes the name Pope Pius II as the 210th pope.
- September 3 – The coronation of Pope Pius II by Cardinal Prospero Colonna takes place on the front steps of St. Peter's Basilica in Rome.

==== October–December ====
- October 24 – King Afonso V of Portugal conquers the area around Ksar es-Seghir in the Sultanate of Morocco, led by Sultan Abd al-Haqq II.
- November 12 – (6th waxing of Nadaw 820 ME) Min Khayi, ruler of the Burmese Kingdom of Arakan leads a successful defense of an invasion from the Shan State by his son, Prince Min Swe.
- November 13 – Sultan Abd al-Haqq II of Morocco begins a 7-week siege of the Portuguese settlement of Alcácer-Ceguer, but is ultimately unsuccessful in recovering the captured territory.
- December 26 – François II becomes the new Duke of Brittany upon the death of his uncle Arthur de Richemont.

==== Date unknown ====
- The Jewish community is expelled from Erfurt (Germany); their houses are sold, and the synagogue turned into an arsenal.
- Moctezuma I, Tlatoani of Tenochtitlán, leads an expedition to the city-state Coixtlahuaca in Mixtec territory, but is defeated.
- A major volcano erupts.

=== 1459 ===
==== January–March ====
- January 18 – The Order of Our Lady of Bethlehem is founded by Pope Pius II, to defend the island of Lemnos.
- February 3 – The coronation of François II as Duke of the semi-independent Duchy of Brittany takes place in Nantes.
- February 27 – Frederick III, Holy Roman Emperor and Archduke of Austria, proclaims himself to be rightful King of Hungary and prepares to invade the kingdom in order to overthrow King Mathias Corvinus.
- March 4 – Austrian troops, on orders of Frederick III, invade Hungary, starting the Austrian–Hungarian War. The war continues for three years before the Austrians withdraw in 1462.

==== April–June ====
- April 8 – Stefan Branković, despot of Serbia, is overthrown by King Stefan Tomaš of Bosnia, who installs his son, Stephen Tomašević as the new despot
- April 24 – The Fra Mauro map of the world is completed by the Italian cartographers Fra Mauro and Andrea Bianco, who had been hired by the late King Afonso V of Portugal to produce an up-to-date geography for the use by explorers.
- April 25 – The Treaty of Eger is signed by representatives of the Kingdom of Bohemia and the Electorate of Saxony, setting a border that remains more than 500 years later as the border between the Czech Republic and Germany as running along the main ridge of the Ore Mountains from Eger to the River Elbe.
- May 3, Pope Pius II issues a papal bull to approve building the University of Valence in France. The university will exist for almost 240 years before being closed during the French Revolution.
- May 12 – In India, Rao Jodha, ruler of the Kingdom of Marwar (now in the state of Rajasthan) selects the site of a new capital city, which will be named Jodhpur in his honor.
- May 27 – Pope Pius II arrives in Mantua in the Italian region of Lombardy as the guest of Ludovico III Gonzaga, Marquis of Mantua, in order to convene the Council of Mantua in hopes of organizing a crusade against the Ottoman Empire. Meetings being on June 1 the Council continues for six months.
- June 20 – The Despotate of Serbia comes to an end as the despot Stefan Tomašević surrenders the last Serbian city, Smederevo, without a fight.

==== July–September ====
- July 2 – The Sultanate of Morocco renews its siege of Ksar es-Seghir (renamed Alcácer-Ceguer), which had been seized by the Kingdom of Portgal on October 24, 1458. The Portuguese Governor Duarte de Meneses leads the defense of the city against the attacks led by the Sultan Abd al-Haqq II, who calls off the siege after less than two months.
- August 24 – Morocco's Sultan Abd al-Haqq II ends his siege of the Portuguese fortress at Ksar es-Seghir.
- September 23 – Wars of the Roses: At the Battle of Blore Heath in the Kingdom of England, Yorkists under Richard Neville, 5th Earl of Salisbury, defeat a Lancastrian force.
- September 26 – Pope Pius II calls upon the participants of at the Council of Mantua to fund and participate in a Christian crusade to recapture Constantinople from the Muslim Ottomans, who had seized it in 1453.

==== October–December ====
- October 12 – Wars of the Roses: With a royal force advancing on his fortress at Ludlow, Richard Plantagenet, Duke of York, flees to Ireland, while his ally Richard Neville, 16th Earl of Warwick (Warwick the Kingmaker, eldest son of the Earl of Salisbury) goes to Calais.
- November 12 – Pope Pius II issues the papal bull Inter Ceteras, founding the University of Basel in Switzerland, though the university does not begin operations until April 4 the following year.
- November 20 – In England, the "Parliament of Devils" (so called because it consists of Lancastrian supporters and Yorkist nobles are not invited) opens its session at Coventry in St Mary's Priory and Cathedral.
- December 18 – At the consistory of 1439, Pope Eugene IV appoints an unprecedented 17 Roman Catholic cardinals.
- December 20 – England's "Parliament of Devils" is dissolved after accomplishhing its purpose of passing bills of attainder for high treason, indictments of Richard of York, 3rd Duke of York and other Yorkist supporters in the War of the Roses. Other prominent Yorkists charges are Edward, Earl of March (the future King Edward IV), Edmund, Earl of Rutland, Richard Neville, 5th Earl of Salisbury, and his son, Richard Neville, 16th Earl of Warwick.

==== Date unknown ====
- The Wallachian town of Bucharest is first mentioned.
- Richard, Duke of York, Lord Lieutenant of Ireland, returns on a second visit to Ireland. The Irish Parliament, meeting at Drogheda, upholds his authority against Henry VI, and an English Act of Attainder.
- Richard Hygons, English composer, begins fifty years of service at Wells Cathedral.

==== Religion ====
- King Thomas of Bosnia forces the clergy of the Bosnian Church into exile.
- According to a legend, the wedding of Christian Rosenkreuz takes place.

== Births ==
1450

- February 12 – Yejong of Joseon, Joseon King (d. 1469)
- May 18 – Piero Soderini, Florentine statesman (d. 1513)
- June 22 – Eleanor of Naples, Duchess of Ferrara (d. 1493)
- July 25 – Jakob Wimpfeling, Renaissance humanist (d. 1528)
- August 18 – Marko Marulić, Croatian poet (d. 1524)
- September 25 – Ursula of Brandenburg, Duchess of Münsterberg-Oels and Countess of Glatz (d. 1508)
- November 12 – Jacques of Savoy, Count of Romont, Prince of Savoy (d. 1486)
- date unknown
  - William Catesby, English politician (d. 1485)
  - Bartolomeo Montagna, Italian painter (d. 1523)
  - Heinrich Isaak, German-Dutch composer (d. 1517)
  - John Cabot, Italian-born explorer (d. 1499)
- probable
  - Kamāl ud-Dīn Behzād, Persian leader of the Herat school
  - Hieronymus Bosch, Dutch painter (d. 1516)
  - Gaspar Corte-Real, Portuguese explorer (d. 1501)
  - Juan de la Cosa, Spanish navigator and cartographer (d. 1510)
  - Josquin des Prez, Dutch composer (d. 1521)
  - Heinrich Isaac, Franco-Flemish composer (d. 1517)
  - Pietro Antonio Solari, Italian architect (d. 1493)
  - Petrus Thaborita, Dutch historian and monk (d. 1527)
  - Nyai Gede Pinateh, Javanese merchant (d. 1500)

1451

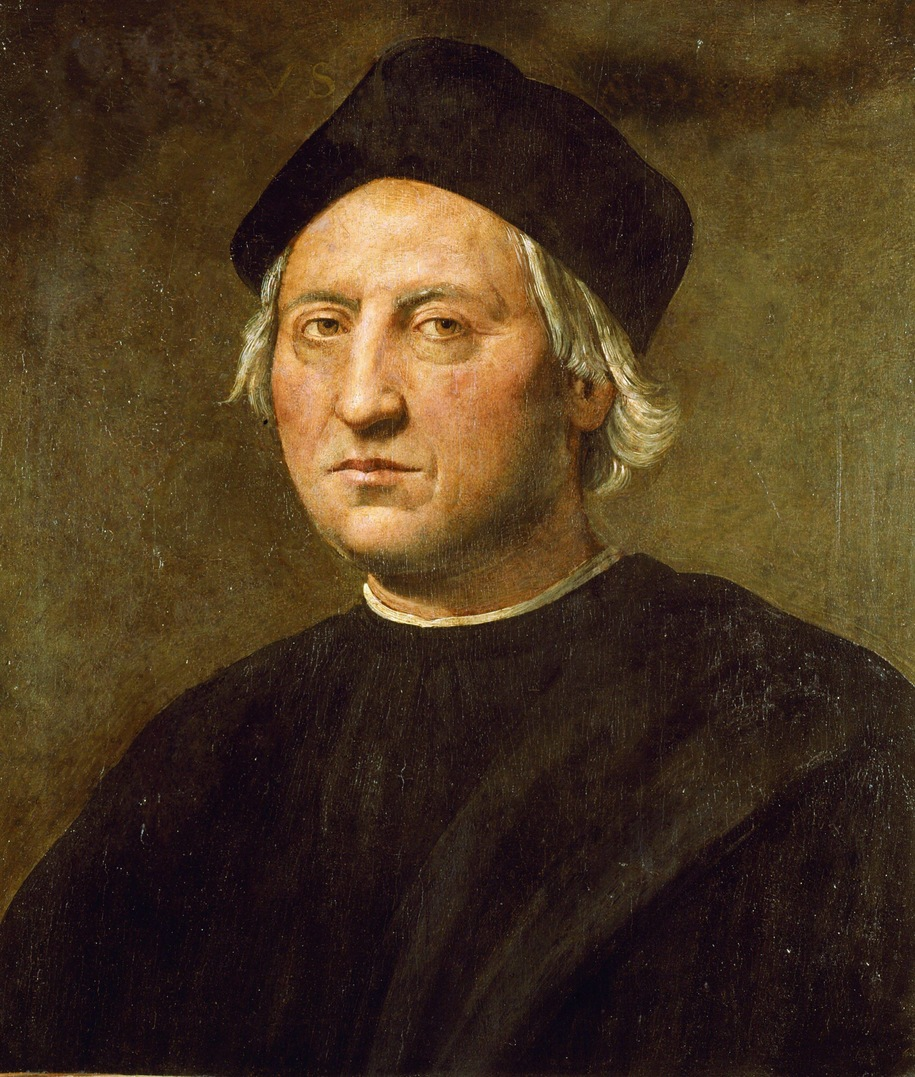
Christopher Columbus

- January 14 – Franchinus Gaffurius, Italian composer (d. 1522)
- January 29 – John, Prince of Portugal, Prince of Portugal (d. 1451)
- February 17 – Raffaello Maffei, Italian theologian (d. 1522)
- March 5 – William Herbert, 2nd Earl of Pembroke, English earl (d. 1491)
- March 9 – Amerigo Vespucci, Italian explorer (d. 1512)
- April 22 – Queen Isabella I of Castile, Castillian queen regnant and first queen of a united Spain (by marriage to Ferdinand of Aragon) (d. 1504)
- May 2 – René II, Duke of Lorraine (d. 1508)
- May 17 – Engelbert II of Nassau, Count of Nassau-Vianden and Lord of Breda (1475–1504) (d. 1504)
- June 1 – Giles Daubeney, 1st Baron Daubeney, English soldier, diplomat, courtier and politician (d. 1508)
- July 10 – James III of Scotland (d. 1488)
- September 5 – Isabel Neville, Duchess of Clarence, elder daughter of Richard Neville (d. 1476)
- November 29 – Elisabeth of Brandenburg, Duchess of Württemberg (d. 1524)
- date unknown
  - Christopher Columbus, Italian-born explorer (d. 1506)
  - Ignatius Noah of Lebanon, Syriac Orthodox patriarch of Antioch (d. 1509).
  - Guru Jambheshwar, Rajasthani founder of the Bishnoi Panth (d. 1536)

1452

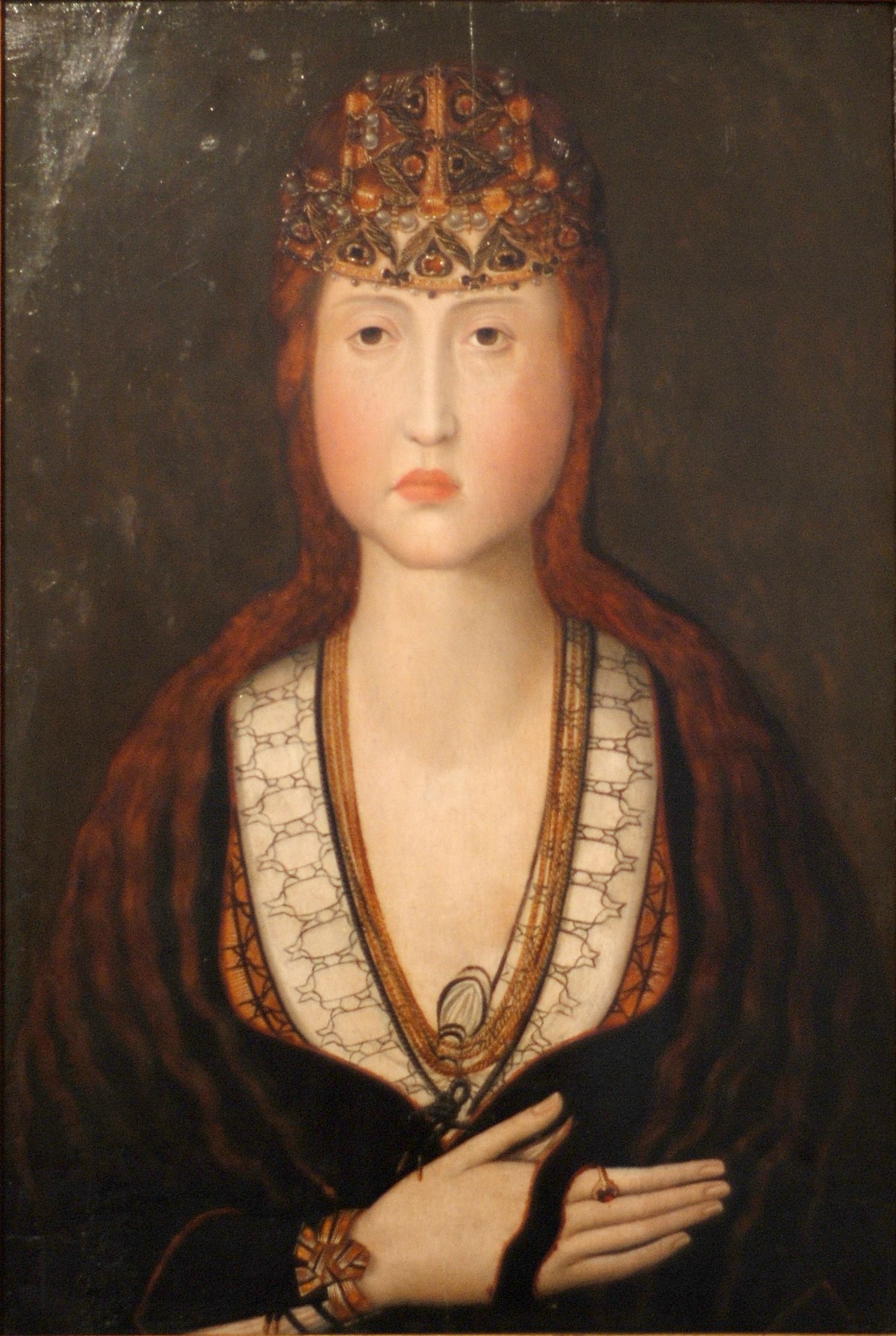
Joanna, Princess of Portugal

- February 6 – Joanna, Princess of Portugal (d. 1490)
- February 14
  - Davide Ghirlandaio, Italian painter and mosaicist (d. 1525)
  - Pandolfo Petrucci, tyrant of Siena (d. 1512)
- March 10 – King Ferdinand II of Aragon, Aragonese king and first king of a united Spain (by marriage to Isabella of Castile) (d. 1516)
- April 15 – Leonardo da Vinci, Italian artist and inventor (d. 1519)
- April 19 – King Frederick of Naples (d. 1504)
- May 18 – Henry the Younger of Poděbrady, Bohemian nobleman (d. 1492)
- July 27
  - Ludovico Sforza, Duke of Milan (d. 1508)
  - Lucrezia Crivelli, mistress of Ludovico Sforza (d. 1534) (approximate date)
- August 12 – Abraham Zacuto, Spanish Jewish astronomer, astrologer, mathematician, rabbi and historian (d. 1515)
- September 21 – Girolamo Savonarola, Italian religious reformer (d. 1498)
- October 2 – King Richard III of England (d. 1485)
- December 6 – Antonio Mancinelli, Italian humanist pedagogue and grammarian (d. 1505)
- December 10 – Johannes Stöffler, German mathematician (d. 1531)
- Date unknown
  - Diogo Cão, Portuguese explorer (d. 1486)
  - Hugh Oldham, English bishop and patron of education (d. 1519)

1453

- January 6 – Girolamo Benivieni, Italian poet
- March 2 – Johannes Engel, German doctor, astronomer and astrologer
- September 1 – Gonzalo Fernández de Córdoba, Spanish general and statesman
- October 13 – Edward of Westminster, Prince of Wales, only son of Henry VI
- October 25 – Giuliano de' Medici, Italian nobleman
- November 7 – Filippo Beroaldo, philosopher and scholar
- November 15 – Alfonso, Prince of Asturias
- Afonso de Albuquerque, Portuguese naval and military commander
- Firdevsī-i Rūmī, Turkish poet
- Shin Mahasilavamsa, Burmese poet
- Sultan-Khalil, Sultan of the Aq Qoyunlu

1454

- June 3 – Bogislaw X, Duke of Pomerania (1474–1523) (d. 1523)
- June 16 – Joanna of Aragon, Queen of Naples (d. 1517)
- July 14 – Poliziano, Italian humanist (d. 1494)
- September 4 – Henry Stafford, 2nd Duke of Buckingham, English politician (d. 1483)
- September 24 – Gerold Edlibach, Swiss historian (d. 1530)
- November 25 – Catherine Cornaro, Queen of Cyprus (d. 1510)
- date unknown
  - Domenico Maria Novara da Ferrara, Italian astronomer (d. 1504)
  - Pinturicchio, Italian painter (d. 1513)
  - Choe Bu, Korean official and venturer to China (d. 1504)
  - Alexander Stewart, Duke of Albany (d. 1485)

1455

- January 9 – William IV, Duke of Jülich-Berg, Count of Ravensberg (d. 1511)
- January 29 – Johann Reuchlin, German-born humanist and scholar (d. 1522)
- February 2 – King John of Denmark, Norway, and Sweden (d. 1513)
- March 3
  - King John II of Portugal (d. 1495)
  - Ascanio Sforza, Italian Catholic cardinal (d. 1505)
- March 15 – Pietro Accolti, Italian Catholic cardinal (d. 1532)
- April 17 – Andrea Gritti, Doge of Venice (d. 1538)
- May 16 – Wolfgang I of Oettingen, German count (d. 1522)
- June 1 – Anne of Savoy, Savoy royal (d. 1480)
- July 9 – Frederick IV of Baden, Dutch bishop (d. 1517)
- July 15 – Queen Yun, Korean queen (d. 1482)
- August 2 – John Cicero, Elector of Brandenburg (d. 1499)
- August 15 – George, Duke of Bavaria (d. 1503)
- November 9 – John V, Count of Nassau-Siegen, Stadtholder of Guelders and Zutphen (d. 1516)
- date unknown
  - Peter Vischer the Elder, German sculptor (approximate date) (d. 1529)
  - Estefania Carròs i de Mur, Spanish educator (approximate date) (d. 1511)
  - Raden Patah, Javanese sultan, founder of the Demak Sultanate (d. 1518)
  - María de Ajofrín, Spanish visionary (d. 1489)
  - Nicholas Barnham, English knight, killed in the War of the Roses (d. 1485)
  - Angelo da Vallombrosa, Italian jurist and abbot (d. 1530)

1456

- March – Jan Łaski, Polish nobleman (d. 1531)
- March 1 – Vladislaus II, king of Bohemia, Hungary and Croatia (d. 1516)
- June 11 – Anne Neville, queen consort of Richard III of England (d. 1485)
- June 23 – Margaret of Denmark, Queen of Scotland, consort of James III of Scotland (d. 1486)
- June 25 – Henry V of Rosenberg, Bohemian nobleman (d. 1489)
- October 16 – Ludmila of Poděbrady, Regent of the duchies of Brzeg and Oława from 1488 (d. 1503)
- November 7 – Margaret of Bavaria, Electress Palatine and hereditary princess of Bavaria-Landshut (d. 1501)
- November 8 – Queen Gonghye, Korean royal consort (d. 1474)
- date unknown
  - Jeanne Hachette (Laisné), French peasant heroine
  - Antonia di Paolo di Dono, Italian artist and daughter of Paolo di Dono (d. 1491)
  - Jan Lubrański, Polish bishop (d. 1520)

1457

- January 18 – Antonio Trivulzio, seniore, Roman Catholic cardinal (d. 1508)
- January 28 – King Henry VII of England (d. 1509)
- February 2 – Peter Martyr d'Anghiera, Italo-Spanish historian and diplomat (d. 1526)
- February 13 – Mary of Burgundy, sovereign duchess regnant of Burgundy, married to Maximilian I, Holy Roman Emperor (d. 1482)
- August 20 – Seongjong of Joseon, King of Joseon (d. 1494)
- September 21 – Hedwig Jagiellon, Duchess of Bavaria, Polish princess (d. 1502)
- November 16 – Beatrice of Naples, Hungarian queen (d. 1508)
- date unknown – Richard Grey, English knight, half brother of Edward V (executed 1483)
- probable
  - Sebastian Brant, German humanist and satirist (d. 1521)
  - Filippino Lippi, Florentine painter (d. 1504)
  - Jacob Obrecht, Dutch composer (d. 1505)
  - Thomas West, 8th Baron De La Warr (d. 1525)

1458

- February 15 – Ivan the Young, Ruler of Tver (d. 1490)
- April 9 – Camilla Battista da Varano, Italian saint (d. 1524)
- April 13 – John II, Duke of Cleves (d. 1521)
- May 2 – Eleanor of Viseu, Portuguese princess and later Queen of Portugal (d. 1525)
- July 28 – Jacopo Sannazaro, Italian poet (d. 1530)
- August 18 – Lorenzo Pucci, Italian Catholic cardinal (d. 1531)
- October 3 – Saint Casimir, Prince of Poland and Duke of Lithuania (d. 1484)
- October 16 – Adolph II, Prince of Anhalt-Köthen, German prince (d. 1526)
- December 25 – Amago Tsunehisa, Japanese warlord (d. 1541)
- probable
  - Thomas Docwra, Grand Prior of the English Knights Hospitaller (d. 1527)
  - Jacob Obrecht, Dutch composer (d. 1505)

1459

- January 25 – Paul Hofhaimer, Austrian organist and composer (d. 1537)
- March 2 – Pope Adrian VI, Dutch-born churchman (d. 1523)
- March 6 – Jakob Fugger, German banker (d. 1525)
- March 22 – Maximilian I, Holy Roman Emperor (d. 1519)
- May 15 – John I, Count Palatine of Simmern (1480–1509) (d. 1509)
- July – Mingyi Nyo, founder of the Toungoo Dynasty of Burma (Myanmar) (d. 1530)
- July 11 – Kaspar, Count Palatine of Zweibrücken, German nobleman (d. 1527)
- October 6 – Martin Behaim, German explorer and cartographer (d. 1507)
- December 22 – Sultan Cem, pretender to the Ottoman throne (d. 1495)
- December 27 – King John I Albert of Poland (d. 1501)
- date unknown
  - Christina Brask, Swedish writer and translator (d. 1520)
  - Edward Poynings, Lord Deputy to King Henry VII of England (d. 1521)
- probable – Lorenzo di Credi, Florentine painter and sculptor (d. 1537)
- approximate
  - Jheronimus de Clibano, Dutch composer (d. 1503)
  - Jean Mouton, French composer (d. 1522)

== Deaths ==
1450

- January 9 – Adam Moleyns, English courtier and Bishop of Chichester
- February 9 – Agnès Sorel, mistress of Charles VII of France (b. c. 1422)
- April 8 – Sejong the Great of Joseon, ruler of Korea (b. 1397)
- May 2 – William de la Pole, 1st Duke of Suffolk, English military leader (born 1396)
- May 9 – Abdal-Latif Mirza, ruler of Transoxania
- July 2 – Ranuccio Farnese il Vecchio, Italian condottiero (b. c. 1390)
- July 4 – James Fiennes, 1st Baron Saye and Sele, English soldier and politician (b. c. 1395)
- July 18 – Francis I, Duke of Brittany (b. 1414)
- July 26 – Cecily Neville, Duchess of Warwick (b. 1424)
- August 15 – Alberto da Sarteano, Italian Franciscan friar and papal legate (b. 1385)
- August 27 – Reginald West, 6th Baron De La Warr, English politician (b. 1395)
- August 31 – Isabella of Navarre, Countess of Armagnac (b. 1395)
- September 16 – Louis Aleman, French cardinal
- September 22 – William Tresham, English politician
- October 1 – Leonello d'Este, Marquis of Ferrara, Italian noble (b. 1407)
- November 3 – Paola Colonna, Lady of Piombino (b. c. 1378)
- November 5 – John IV, Count of Armagnac (b. 1396)

1451

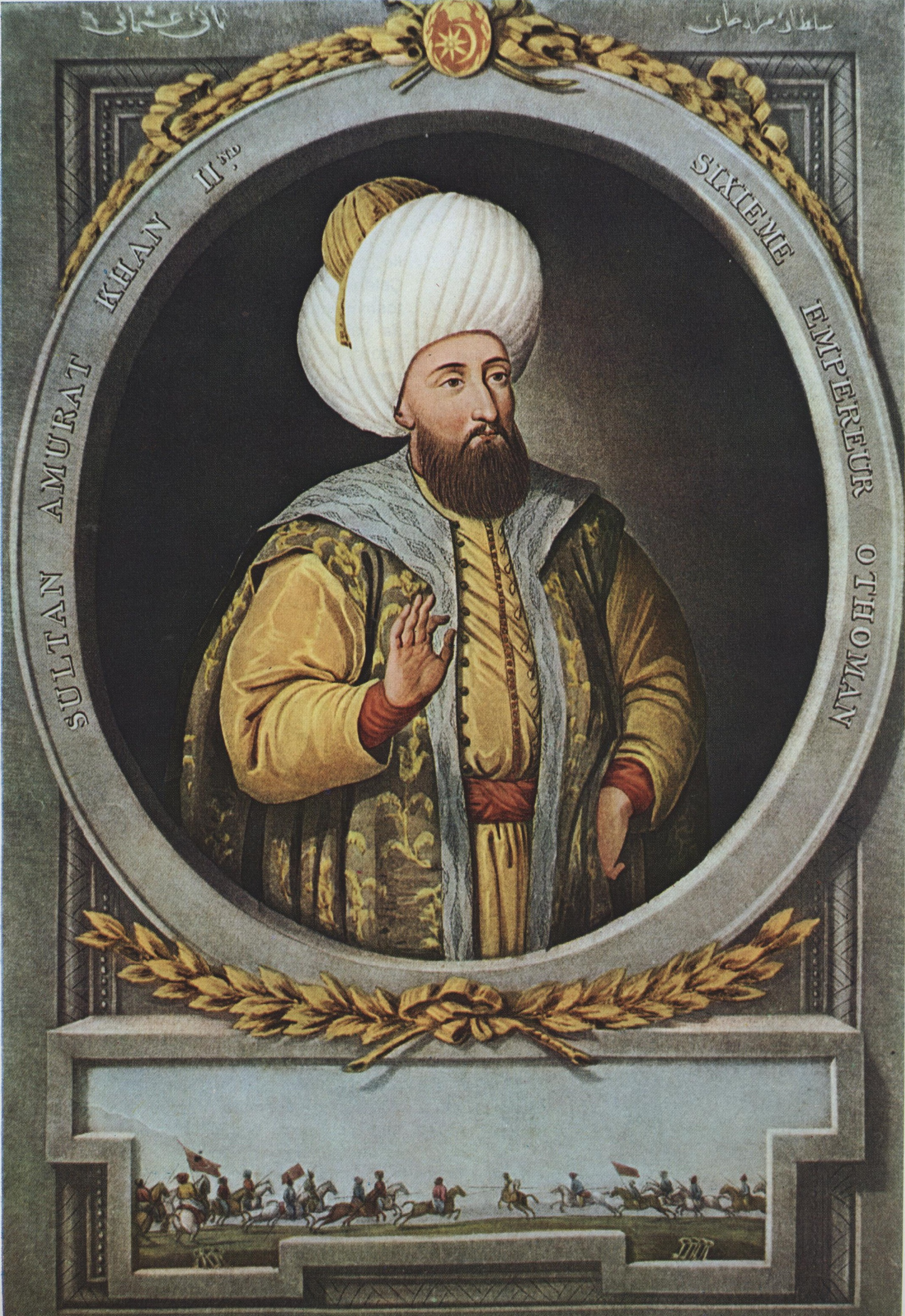
Sultan Murad II

- January 7 – Antipope Felix V (b. 1383)
- January 18 – Henry II, Count of Nassau-Siegen, Co-ruler of Nassau-Siegen (1442–1451) (b. 1414)
- February 3 – Murad II, Ottoman Sultan (b. 1404)
- June – ‘Abdullah, Timurid Empire ruler
- July 11 – Barbara of Cilli, Holy Roman Empress, queen consort of Hungary and Bohemia (b. 1392)
- October – Bogdan II of Moldavia, assassinated by Petru Aron
- date unknown
  - Stefan Lochner, German painter (b. 1400)
  - John Lydgate, English monk and poet (b. 1370)
  - al-Mustakfi II, Abbasid Caliph

1452

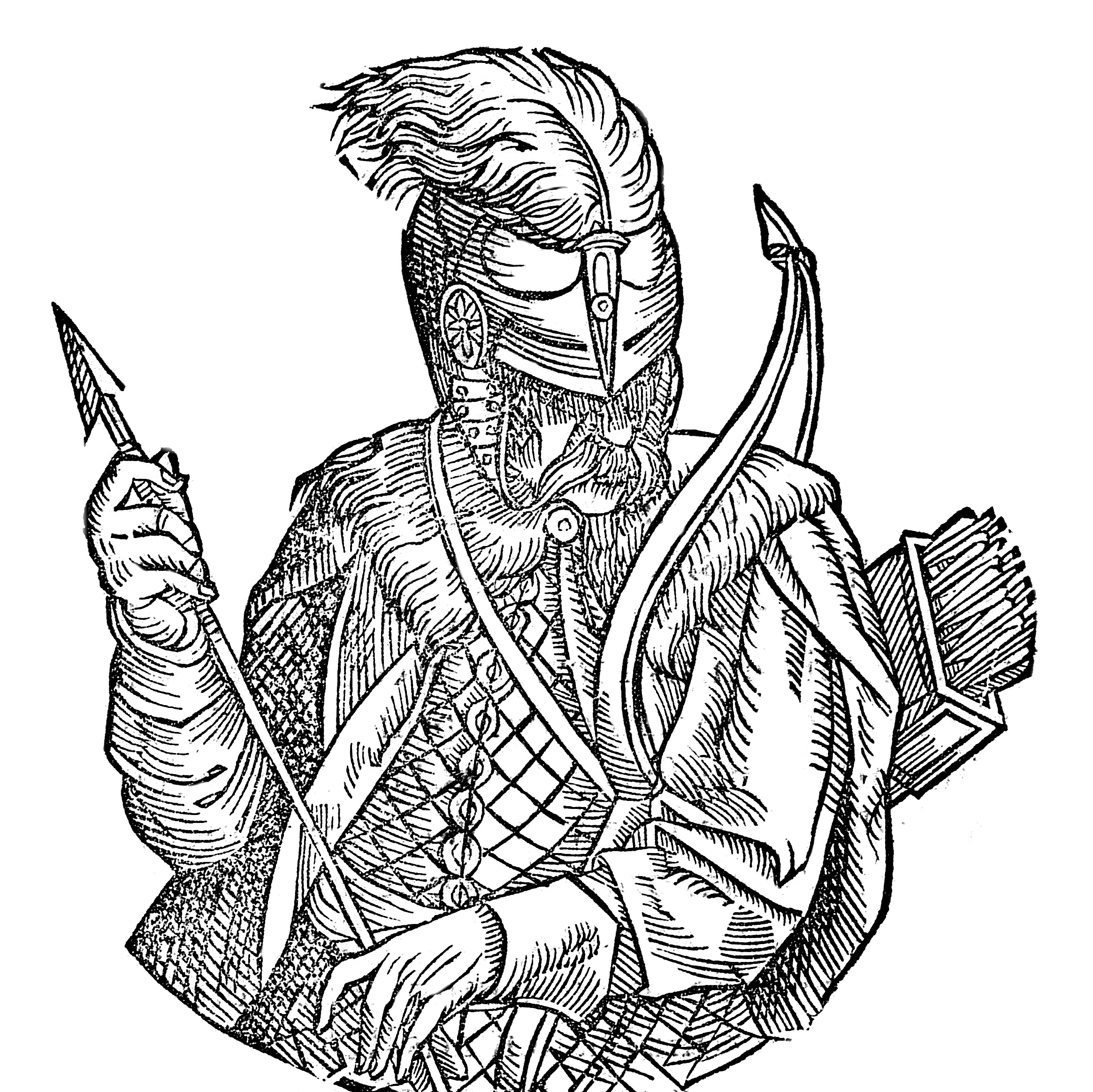
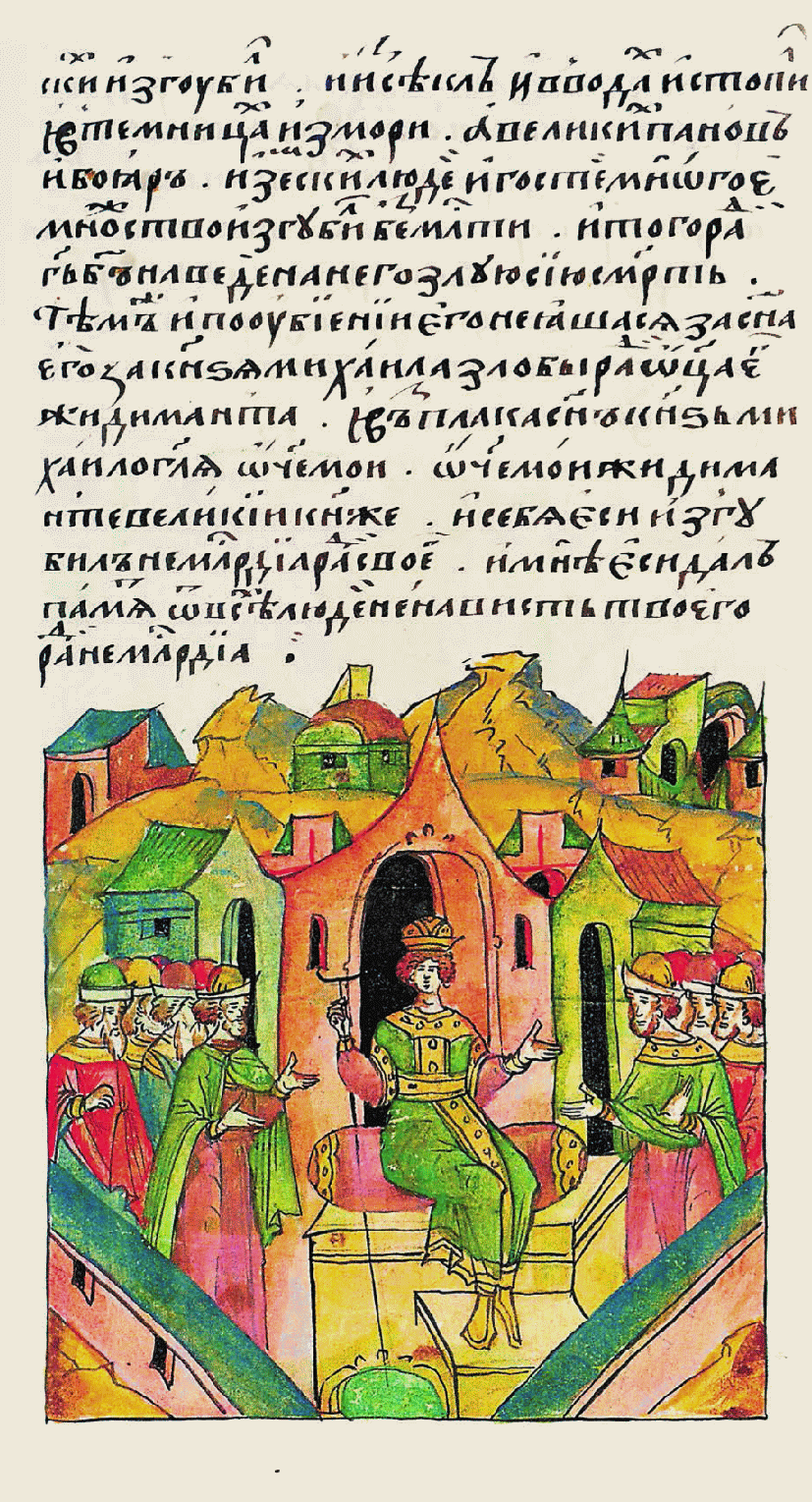
Švitrigaila and Michał Bolesław Zygmuntowicz (Michael Žygimantaitis) died on February 10, 1452

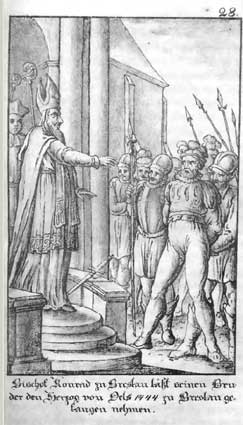
Konrad VII the White

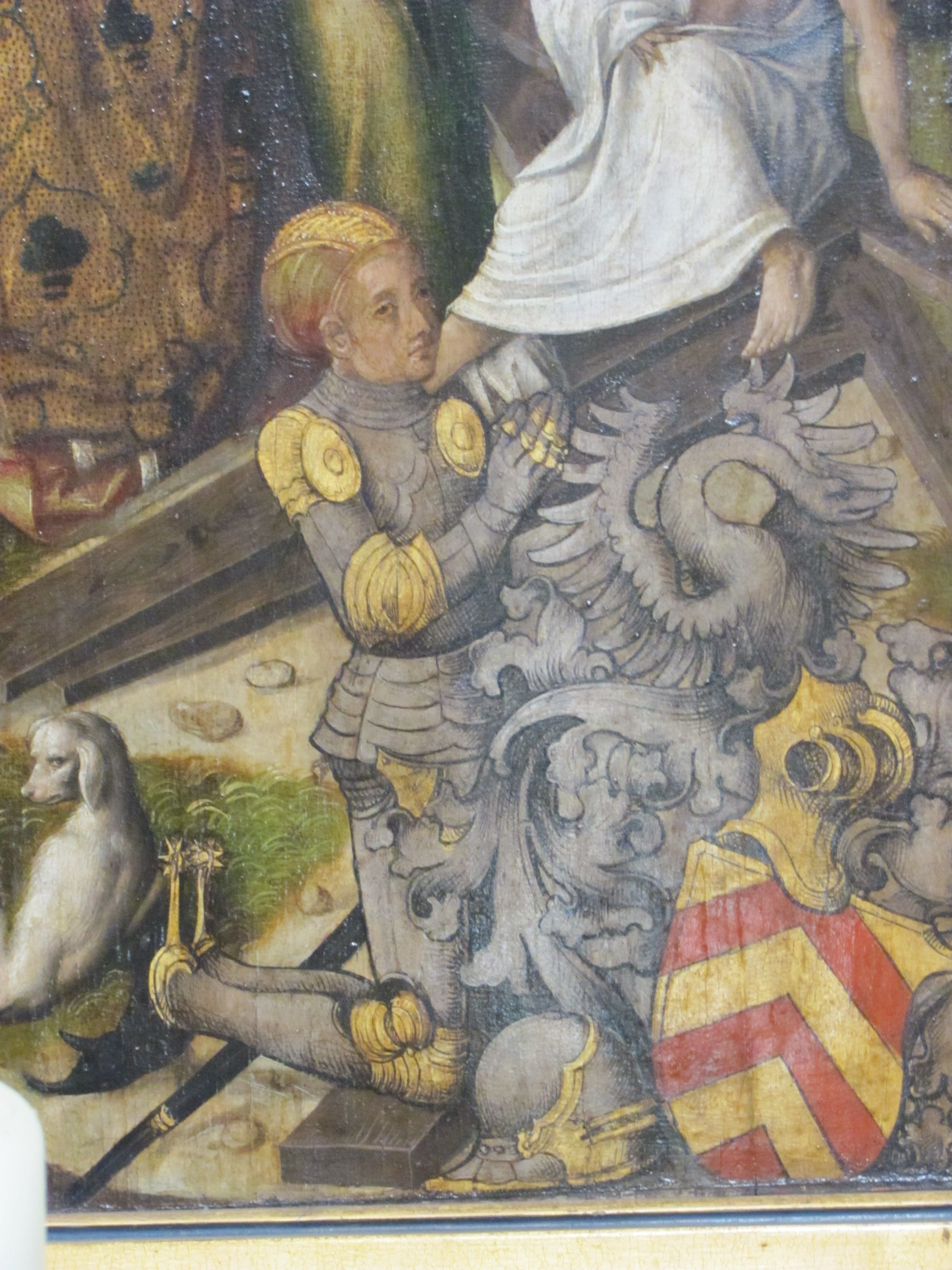
Reinhard III, Count of Hanau

- February 10
  - Švitrigaila, Grand Prince of Lithuania
  - Michał Bolesław Zygmuntowicz (Michael Žygimantaitis), Prince of Black Ruthenia
- February 14 – Konrad VII the White, Duke of Oleśnica
- February 22 – William Douglas, 8th Earl of Douglas (b. 1425)
- April 20 – Reinhard III, Count of Hanau (1451–1452) (b. 1412)
- May – John Stafford, Archbishop of Canterbury
- October – Nicholas Close, English bishop
- probable – Gemistus Pletho, Greek philosopher

1453

- January 9 – Stefano Porcari, Italian nobleman and humanist politician
- February 13 – Sayf al-Din Jaqmaq, Egyptian Mamluk sultan
- May 29
  - Constantine XI Palaiologos, Byzantine emperor
  - Demetrios Palaiologos Metochites, Byzantine noble and ambassador
  - Orhan Çelebi, Ottoman prince
- June 2 or June 3 – Loukas Notaras, Byzantine statesman and naval commander
- June 22 – Álvaro de Luna, Spanish knight and statesman
- July – Jacques de Lalaing, Burgundian knight
- July 17
  - John Talbot, 1st Earl of Shrewsbury, English nobleman and military leader
  - John Talbot, 1st Viscount Lisle, English nobleman, son of the Earl of Shrewsbury
- December 16 – Zhu Jianji, crown prince of the Ming Dynasty
- December 24 – John Dunstaple, English composer
- Dmitry Shemyaka, claimant to the Principality of Moscow
- Giovanni Giustiniani, Genoese mercenary
- Nguyễn An, Vietnamese-born Ming Dynasty court eunuch and architect
- Sophia of Lithuania, Grand Princess of Moscow

1454

- March 22 – John Kemp, Archbishop of Canterbury
- July 20 – King John II of Castile (b. 1405)
- December 10 – Ignatius Behnam Hadloyo, Syriac Orthodox Patriarch of Antioch.
- date unknown
  - Chiara Zorzi, regent of Athens
  - William Turnbull, Bishop of Glasgow
  - Robert Wingfield, English politician (b. 1403)

1455

- February 18 – Fra Angelico, Italian painter (b. 1395)
- March 24 – Pope Nicholas V (b. 1397)
- April 1 – Zbigniew Oleśnicki, Polish Catholic cardinal and statesman (b. 1389)
- May 1 – Archibald Douglas, Earl of Moray (in battle)
- May 22 (killed at the First Battle of St Albans):
  - Henry Percy, 2nd Earl of Northumberland, Lancastrian commander (b. 1393)
  - Edmund Beaufort, 2nd Duke of Somerset, Lancastrian commander (b. 1406)
  - Thomas Clifford, 8th Baron de Clifford, Lancastrian commander (b. 1414)
- September 3 – Alonso Tostado, Spanish Catholic bishop
- October 22 – Johannes Brassart, Flemish composer
- October 28 – Guillaume-Hugues d'Estaing, French Catholic cardinal
- December 1 – Lorenzo Ghiberti, Italian sculptor and metal smith (b. 1378)
- December 2 – Isabel of Coimbra, queen of Portugal (b. 1432)

1456

- January 17 – Elisabeth of Lorraine-Vaudémont, French translator (b. 1395)
- August 11 – John Hunyadi, Hungarian statesman and military leader (b. c. 1406)
- August 20 – Vladislav II of Wallachia
- October 17 – Nicolas Grenon, French composer (b. 1375)
- October 23 – Giovanni da Capistrano, Italian saint (b. 1386)
- November 3 – Edmund Tudor, 1st Earl of Richmond, father of King Henry VII of England (b. 1431)
- November 9 – Ulrich II, Count of Celje (b. 1406)
- November 25 – Jacques Cœur, French merchant (b. 1395)
- December 4 – Charles I, Duke of Bourbon (b. 1401)
- December 24 – Đurađ Branković, Despot of Serbia (b. 1377)
- date unknown – Juan de Mena, Spanish poet (b. 1411)

1457

- March 14 – Jingtai Emperor of China (b. 1428)
- March 16 – László Hunyadi, Hungarian statesman and warrior (b. 1433)
- May 22 – Saint Rita of Cascia, Italian saint (b. 1381)
- August 1 – Lorenzo Valla, Italian humanist
- August 19 – Andrea del Castagno, Italian painter (b. 1421)
- September 12 – Gabriele Sforza, Archbishop of Milan (b. 1423)
- September 14 – Countess Palatine Margaret of Mosbach, countess consort of Hanau (b. 1432)
- September 22 – Peter II, Duke of Brittany (b. 1418)
- November 3 – Ludwig II, Count of Württemberg-Urach, German noble (b. 1439)
- November 23 – King Ladislaus Posthumus of Bohemia and Hungary (b. 1440)
- December 24 – Danjong of Joseon, King of Joseon (b. 1441)
- date unknown
  - Abul-Qasim Babur Mirza, ruler of Khurasan (b. 1422)
  - Bartolomeu Perestrello, Portuguese navigator and explorer (b. 1395)

1458

- January 17 – Louis I, Landgrave of Hesse, Landgrave of Hesse (1413–1458) (b. 1402)
- February 20 – Lazar Branković, Despot of Serbia
- March 25 – Íñigo López de Mendoza, 1st Marquis of Santillana, Spanish poet (b. 1398)
- April 11 – Helena Palaiologina, Queen of Cyprus (b. 1428)
- June 27 – King Alfonso V of Aragon (b. 1396)
- July 28 – John II of Cyprus
- August 6 – Pope Callixtus III (b. 1378)
- September 7 – Maria of Castile, Queen of Aragon, Queen consort of Aragon and Naples (b. 1401)
- December 26 – Arthur III, Duke of Brittany (b. 1393)
- date unknown – Isabelle Romée, mother of Joan of Arc

1459

- February 14 – Stephen, Count Palatine of Simmern-Zweibrücken (b. 1385)
- March 3 – Ausiàs March, Catalan poet from Valencia (b. 1397)
- May 2 – Antoninus of Florence, Italian archbishop (b. 1389)
- August 27 – James of Portugal, Portuguese cardinal (b. 1433)
- September 6 – Katharina of Nassau-Beilstein, German regent
- September 17 – Isabella of Urgell, Duchess of Coimbra, Portuguese Duchess (b. 1409)
- September 23 (killed at the Battle of Blore Heath):
  - James Tuchet, 5th Baron Audley (b. 1400)
  - Thomas Dutton, English knight (b. 1421)
- September 24 – Eric of Pomerania, King of Norway, Denmark and Sweden (b. 1382)
- October 30 – Gian Francesco Poggio Bracciolini, Italian humanist (b. 1380)
- November 5 – John Fastolf, English soldier
- December 4 – Adolf VIII, Duke of Southern Jutland (b. 1401)

== Sources ==
- Bartusis, Mark C. (1992). The Late Byzantine Army: Arms and Society, 1204–1453. University of Pennsylvania Press. ISBN 9781512821314.
- Bietenholz, P. G.; Deutscher, Thomas B. (1986). Contemporaries of Erasmus: A Biological Register of the Renaissance and Reformation. Vol. 1, A–E. University of Toronto Press.
- De Heer, P. H. (1986). The Care-Taker Emperor: Aspects of the Aspects of the Imperial Institution in Fifteenth-Century China as Reflected in the Political History of the Reign of Chu Chi'i-Yü. Brill. ISBN 9789004078987.
- D'Elia, Anthony F. (2007). "Stefano Porcari's Conspiracy against Pope Nicholas V in 1453 and Republican Culture in Papal Rome". Journal of the History of Ideas. 68 (2): 207–231. JSTOR 30136016.
- Gerli, E. Michael; Armistead, Samuel G., eds. (2003). Medieval Iberia: An Encyclopedia. Taylor & Francis. ISBN 9780415939188.
- Hardy, Duncan (2024). "'There Can Be No Agreement to Take up Arms against the Turks Unless We First Restore the Empire': The Fall of Constantinople and the Rise of a New Political Dynamic in the Holy Roman Empire, 1453–1467". Austrian History Yearbook. doi:10.1017/S0067237824000481.
- Harris, Jonathan (2010). The End of Byzantium. Yale University Press. ISBN 9780300169669. JSTOR j.ctt1npm19.
- Ilardi, Vincent (1959). "The Italian League, Francesco Sforza, and Charles VII (1454-1461)". Studies in the Renaissance. 6: 129–166. doi:10.2307/2857185. JSTOR 2857185.
- Mote, Frederick W.; Twitchett, Denis, eds. (1988). The Cambridge History of China. Vol. 7: The Ming Dynasty, Part 1. doi:10.1017/CHOL9780521243322. ISBN 9781139054751.
  - Chan, Hok-lam. "The Chien-wen, Yung-lo, Hung-hsi, and Hsüan-te reigns, 1399–1435." 182-304.
  - Twitchett, Denis. "The Cheng-t'ung, Ching-t'ai, and T'len-shun reigns, 1436–1464." 305-342.
- Necipoğlu, Nevra (2009). Byzantium between the Ottomans and the Latins. Cambridge University Press. doi:10.1017/CBO9780511576720. ISBN 9780511576720.
- Petry, Carl F. (2022). The Mamluk Sultanate: A History. Cambridge University Press. doi:10.1017/9781108557382. ISBN 9781108557382.
- Philippides, Marios; Hanak, Walter K. (2011). The Siege and the Fall of Constantinople in 1453: Historiography, Topography, and Military Studies. Routledge. doi:10.4324/9781315552927. ISBN 9781315552927.
- Somel, Selcuk Aksin (2003). Historical Dictionary of the Ottoman Empire. Scarecrow Press. ISBN 9780810866065.
- Swain, Elisabeth Ward (1989). "The Wages of Peace: The "Condotte" of Ludovico Gonzaga, 1436–1478". Renaissance Studies. 3 (4): 442–452. JSTOR 24409514.
- Vale, Malcolm (1969). "The Last Years of English Gascony, 1451-1453: The Alexander Prize Essay". Transactions of the Royal Historical Society. 19: 119–138. doi:10.2307/3678742. JSTOR 3678742.
- Allmand, Christopher, ed. (1998). The New Cambridge Medieval History. Vol. 7. doi:10.1017/CHOL9780521382960. ISBN 9781139055758.
  - MacKay, Angus. "Castile and Navarre". 606–626.
- Vaughan, Richard (1970). Philip the Good: The Apogee of Burgundy. Longman. ISBN 9780851159171.
