= 1455 =

1455 in various calendars
- Gregorian calendar: 1455; MCDLV
- Ab urbe condita: 2208
- Armenian calendar: 904; ԹՎ ՋԴ
- Assyrian calendar: 6205
- Balinese saka calendar: 1376–1377
- Bengali calendar: 861–862
- Berber calendar: 2405
- English Regnal year: 33 Hen. 6 – 34 Hen. 6
- Buddhist calendar: 1999
- Burmese calendar: 817
- Byzantine calendar: 6963–6964
- Chinese calendar: 甲戌年 (Wood Dog); 4152 or 3945 — to — 乙亥年 (Wood Pig); 4153 or 3946
- Coptic calendar: 1171–1172
- Discordian calendar: 2621
- Ethiopian calendar: 1447–1448
- Hebrew calendar: 5215–5216
- Hindu calendars
- Vikram Samvat: 1511–1512
- Shaka Samvat: 1376–1377
- Kali Yuga: 4555–4556
- Holocene calendar: 11455
- Igbo calendar: 455–456
- Iranian calendar: 833–834
- Islamic calendar: 859–860
- Japanese calendar: Kyōtoku 4 / Kōshō 1 (康正元年)
- Javanese calendar: 1370–1371
- Julian calendar: 1455; MCDLV
- Korean calendar: 3788
- Minguo calendar: 457 before ROC 民前457年
- Nanakshahi calendar: −13
- Thai solar calendar: 1997–1998
- Tibetan calendar: ཤིང་ཕོ་ཁྱི་ལོ་ (male Wood-Dog); 1581 or 1200 or 428 — to — ཤིང་མོ་ཕག་ལོ་ (female Wood-Boar); 1582 or 1201 or 429

May 22: The Wars of the Roses begin with the First Battle of St Albans.

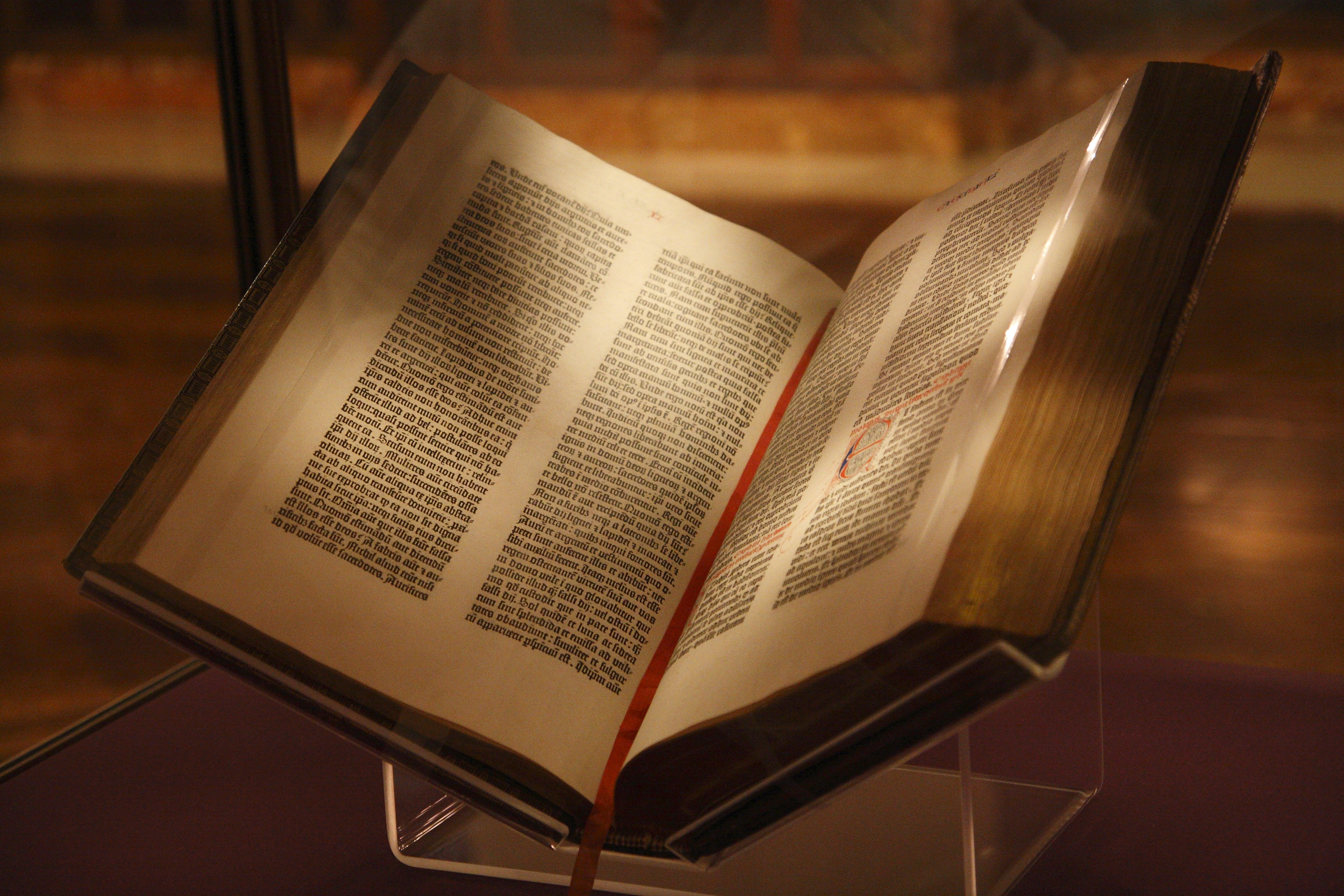
The Gutenberg Bible is printed.

Year 1455 (MCDLV) was a common year starting on Wednesday (full) of the Julian calendar.

== Events ==
=== January–March ===
- January 8 – Pope Nicholas V publishes Romanus Pontifex, an encyclical addressed to King Afonso V of Portugal, which sanctions the conquest of non-Christian lands, and the reduction of native non-Christian populations to 'perpetual slavery'. (Later there will be a dramatic reversal when, in 1537, the bull Sublimis Deus of Pope Paul III forbids the enslavement of non-Christians.)
- February 23 – The Gutenberg Bible is the first book printed with movable type.
- February 24 – Alexăndrel of Moldavia retakes the position of Prince of Moldavia after forcing out Petru Aron.
- March 2 – After an agreement reached in Venice on August 30, the Italic League (Lega Italica) comes into being as a 25-year truce and mutual defense agreement between the Republic of Venice, the Papal States, the Duchy of Milan, the Republic of Florence, and the Kingdom of Naples.
- March 22 – Venetian explorer and slave trader Alvise Cadamosto and a crew commanded by Vicente Dias depart from Porto Santo on the first of two voyages down the coast of West Africa and reaches the Gambia River before being forced to turn back by the crew.
- March 24 – (6th waxing of Tagu 816 ME Burmese kings Min Khayi of Arakan and Narapati of Ava meet in a summit near Minbu at Natyegan Hill.

=== April–June ===
- April 4 – The papal conclave to replace the late Pope Nicholas V begins. For the first time, the conclave is held at the Apostolic Palace in Rome. In the first rounds of ballots, the two front-running candidates are Cardinal Latino Orsini and Cardinal Prospero Colonna, and Colonna receives a plurality of votes, but not the required two-thirds majority.
- April 8 – Cardinal Alfons de Borja is elected as the 209th Roman Catholic pontiff and takes the name Pope Calixtus III.
- May 1 – Battle of Arkinholm: Forces loyal to King James II of Scotland defeat the supporters of the Earl of Douglas.
- May 22 – The Wars of the Roses begin in England at the Battle of St Albans, as Richard, Duke of York, captures King Henry VI as a prisoner of war.
- May 25 – Petru Aron retakes the position of Prince of Moldavia after forcing Prince Alexăndrel (who had taken the throne from him on February 24) to flee the country.
- June 1 – Novo Brdo, the last defense of Serbia, falls to the Ottoman Turks after a siege of 40 days. All high ranking Serbian officials are executed and younger men and boys are taken captive to serve in the Ottoman Army, while 700 women and girls are taken as wives by Ottoman commanders.
- June 3 – Saint Vincent Ferrer is canonized 36 years after his death by Pope Callixtus III in a ceremony at the Dominican church of Santa Maria sopra Minerva in Rome.
- June 15 – In Egypt, the Sultan Sayf al-Din Inal confronts a revolt of 500 of his ethnic Circassian slave-troops (mamluks) after rejecting the soldiers' requests for camels to accompany them on an expedition against Bedouin invaders in the Nile Delta. After attempting to assassinate the Sultan's secretary, Yunus al-Aqba'i, the rebels join discontented Zahiri troops and besieged the Cairo Citadel. Facing a withdrawal of support from the Egyptian Caliph, the Sultan eventually meets the rebels' demands.
- June 21 – In what is now the nation of Kosovo, the city of Prizren is captured from the Serbian Despotate by the Ottoman Turkish invaders.
- June 25 – Prince João, the new son of King Afonso V of Portugal, is approved as the heir to the throne by the representatives of the three estates of the realm (nobility, clergy and bourgeoisie) in the Portuguese Cortes at Lisbon.

=== July–September ===
- July 4 – King Danjong of Korea, ruler since the death in 1452 of his father, King Munjong, is forced to abdicate. He is promoted to the figurehead post of King Emeritus (Sangyang).
- July 14 – In the Thirteen Years' War, the Teutonic Order wins the Battle for Kneiphof, though the Order will eventually lose with the signing of a treaty at Thorn.
- August 4 – Prince Sejo, son of the late King Sejong, becomes the new monarch of Korea in Hanseong following the forced abdication of King Danjong.
- September 8 – Pope Calixtus III decides to send Christians on a crusade against the Ottoman Empire in an attempt to recapture Constantinople. At a ceremony at St. Peter's Basilica in Rome, the Pope provides Cardinal Alain de Coëtivy with the crusader's cross and sends him on a mission to meet with King Charles VII of France in hopes of getting French support for the proposed crusade.
- September 15 – Ludwig von Erlichshausen, Grand Master of the Teutonic Order, signs the Treaty of Mewe, selling the Order's territory of the Neumark back to the Electorate of Brandenburg after having owned it for 34 years. Grand Master Ludwig had earlier "pawned" the territory to Brandenburg on February 22, 1454, in return for a loan approved by the Elector Frederick II.

=== October–December ===
- October 5 – Threatened with an invasion by the Ottoman Empire, the Principality of Moldavia sends its first tribute to the Ottoman Sultan, paying 2,000 ducats (equivalent to 6.99 kilograms (15.4 lb) of gold) in response to an ultimatum.
- November 15 – The conflict between Vladislav II of Wallachia and John Hunyadi escalates, so the latter decides to support Vlad the Impaler for the throne of Wallachia, the following year.
- December 15 – At the Battle of Clyst Heath, part of the Bonville–Courtenay feud fought during the Wars of the Roses, Thomas Courtenay, Earl of Devon defeats the Baron William Bonville. Bonville had made the attack after the October 23 murder of his councillor, the lawyer Nicholas Radford.

== Births ==
- January 9 – William IV, Duke of Jülich-Berg, Count of Ravensberg (d. 1511)
- January 29 – Johann Reuchlin, German-born humanist and scholar (d. 1522)
- February 2 – King John of Denmark, Norway, and Sweden (d. 1513)
- March 3
  - King John II of Portugal (d. 1495)
  - Ascanio Sforza, Italian Catholic cardinal (d. 1505)
- March 15 – Pietro Accolti, Italian Catholic cardinal (d. 1532)
- April 17 – Andrea Gritti, Doge of Venice (d. 1538)
- May 16 – Wolfgang I of Oettingen, German count (d. 1522)
- June 1 – Anne of Savoy, Savoy royal (d. 1480)
- July 9 – Frederick IV of Baden, Dutch bishop (d. 1517)
- July 15 – Queen Yun, Korean queen (d. 1482)
- August 2 – John Cicero, Elector of Brandenburg (d. 1499)
- August 15 – George, Duke of Bavaria (d. 1503)
- November 9 – John V, Count of Nassau-Siegen, Stadtholder of Guelders and Zutphen (d. 1516)
- date unknown
  - Peter Vischer the Elder, German sculptor (approximate date) (d. 1529)
  - Estefania Carròs i de Mur, Spanish educator (approximate date) (d. 1511)
  - Raden Patah, Javanese sultan, founder of the Demak Sultanate (d. 1518)
  - María de Ajofrín, Spanish visionary (d. 1489)
  - Nicholas Barnham, English knight, killed in the War of the Roses (d. 1485)
  - Angelo da Vallombrosa, Italian jurist and abbot (d. 1530)

== Deaths ==
- February 18 – Fra Angelico, Italian painter (b. 1395)
- March 24 – Pope Nicholas V (b. 1397)
- April 1 – Zbigniew Oleśnicki, Polish Catholic cardinal and statesman (b. 1389)
- May 1 – Archibald Douglas, Earl of Moray (in battle)
- May 22 (killed at the First Battle of St Albans):
  - Henry Percy, 2nd Earl of Northumberland, Lancastrian commander (b. 1393)
  - Edmund Beaufort, 2nd Duke of Somerset, Lancastrian commander (b. 1406)
  - Thomas Clifford, 8th Baron de Clifford, Lancastrian commander (b. 1414)
- September 3 – Alonso Tostado, Spanish Catholic bishop
- October 22 – Johannes Brassart, Flemish composer
- October 28 – Guillaume-Hugues d'Estaing, French Catholic cardinal
- December 1 – Lorenzo Ghiberti, Italian sculptor and metal smith (b. 1378)
- December 2 – Isabel of Coimbra, queen of Portugal (b. 1432)
