= List of acts of the Parliament of Scotland from 1449 =

This is a list of acts of the Parliament of Scotland for the year 1449.

It lists acts of Parliament of the old Parliament of Scotland, that was merged with the old Parliament of England to form the Parliament of Great Britain, by the Union with England Act 1707 (c. 7).

For other years, see list of acts of the Parliament of Scotland. For the period after 1707, see list of acts of the Parliament of Great Britain.

== 1449 ==
The 6th parliament of James II, held in Edinburgh from 19 January 1450.

Short title, or popular name	Citation	Royal assent
Long title
Church Censure Act 1449 (repealed)	1449 c. 1 (Note: This is the citation in the Record Edition.); 1449 c. 12 (Note: This is the citation in the Duodecimal Edition.)	19 January 1450
Of letteris of capcione to be gevin apon peronis under censuris of haly kirk. Of letters of caption to be given upon persons under censure of the holy church. (Repealed by Statute Law Revision (Scotland) Act 1906 (6 Edw. 7. c. 38))
Public Peace Act 1449 (repealed)	1449 c. 2; 1449 c. 13	19 January 1450
Of general pece to be proclamyt and kepit oute throu the realme. Of general peace to be proclaimed and kept throughout the realm. (Repealed by Statute Law Revision (Scotland) Act 1906 (6 Edw. 7. c. 38))
Treason Act 1449 (repealed)	1449 c. 3; 1449 cc. 14-15	19 January 1450
Of revellione agaynis the kingis persone or his autorite. Of rebellion against the king's person or his authority. (Repealed by Statute Law Revision (Scotland) Act 1906 (6 Edw. 7. c. 38))
Borders Act 1449 (repealed)	1449 c. 4; 1449 c. 16	19 January 1450
For the keping of trewis on the bordouris. For the keeping of the truce on the borders. (Repealed by Statute Law Revision (Scotland) Act 1906 (6 Edw. 7. c. 38))
Officers of Law Act 1449 (repealed)	1449 c. 5; 1449 c. 17	19 January 1450
Of punicione of officiaris that wilfully trespassis in the ministracion of thar office. Of punishment of officials that wilfully trespass in the ministration of their office. (Repealed by Statute Law Revision (Scotland) Act 1906 (6 Edw. 7. c. 38))
Leases Act 1449 still in force	1449 c. 6; 1449 1449 c. 18	19 January 1450
Of takis of landis for termes and takis of wedset landis eftir the oute quyting of the lande. Of taking of land for terms, and taking of mortgaged lands after the quitting of the land.
Spuilyies Act 1449 (repealed)	1449 c. 7; 1449 c. 20	19 January 1450
For the restorance of spoliacion. Of the restoration of spoilation. (Repealed by Statute Law Revision (Scotland) Act 1906 (6 Edw. 7. c. 38))
Officers of Law (No. 2) Act 1449 (repealed)	1449 c. 8; 1449 c. 21	19 January 1450
That Justicez chaumerlanis crownaris and uthir officiaris ryde bot with competent and esy nowmer. That Justices, chamberlains, coroners and other officers ride but with competent and easy number. (Repealed by Statute Law Revision (Scotland) Act 1906 (6 Edw. 7. c. 38))
Sorners and Beggars Act 1449 (repealed)	1449 c. 9; 1449 c. 22	19 January 1450
For the away putting of sornaris fenyet fulis bardis and sic lik utheris rynnaris aboute. For the putting away of sorners, canny fools, bards and such like others running about. (Repealed by Statute Law Revision (Scotland) Act 1906 (6 Edw. 7. c. 38))
Statute Law Revision Act 1449 (repealed)	1449 c. 10 — (Note: This act is not listed in the Duodecimal Edition.)	19 January 1450
Persons chosyn of the thre estatis til examyn the actis of parliamentis and general counsallis. Persons chosen of the three estates to examine the acts of parliaments and general councils. (Repealed by Statute Law Revision (Scotland) Act 1906 (6 Edw. 7. c. 38))
Price of Food Act 1449 (repealed)	1449 c. 11; 1449 cc. 23-24	19 January 1450
Of the bying and selling of vittale for eschewyn of derthe in the lande. Of the buying and selling of victuals for the avoidance of dearth in the land. (Repealed by Statute Law Revision (Scotland) Act 1906 (6 Edw. 7. c. 38))
Treason (No. 2) Act 1449 (repealed)	1449 c. 12; 1449 c. 25	19 January 1450
Of treason agaynis the kingis persone or his majeste. Of treason against the king's person or his majesty. (Repealed by Statute Law Revision (Scotland) Act 1906 (6 Edw. 7. c. 38))
Regalities Act 1449 (repealed)	1449 c. 13; 1449 c. 26	19 January 1450
That regaliteis that ar in the kingis handis be haldin in Ryalte. That regalities that are in the king's hands be held in Royalty. (Repealed by Statute Law Revision (Scotland) Act 1906 (6 Edw. 7. c. 38))
Theft and Robbery Act 1449 (repealed)	1449 c. 14; 1449 c. 27	19 January 1450
For eschewing of masterful thift and reife. For avoidance of masterful theft and robbery. (Repealed by Statute Law Revision (Scotland) Act 1906 (6 Edw. 7. c. 38))
Justice Clerks Act 1449 (repealed)	1449 c. 15; 1449 c. 28	19 January 1450
Anent Justice Clerkis. About Justice Clerks. (Repealed by Statute Law Revision (Scotland) Act 1906 (6 Edw. 7. c. 38))
Castles Act 1449 (repealed)	1449 c. 16 —	19 January 1450
Anent the biggyn of touris or fortalicis. Regarding the building of tours or fortifications. (Repealed by Statute Law Revision (Scotland) Act 1906 (6 Edw. 7. c. 38))
Coinage Act 1449 (repealed)	1449 c. 17; 1449 c. 29	19 January 1450
Anent the mone. About the money. (Repealed by Statute Law Revision (Scotland) Act 1906 (6 Edw. 7. c. 38))
Parties Summoned to King's Council Act 1449 (repealed)	1449 c. 18; 1449 c. 30	19 January 1450
Ordinance anent the contumacy of partiis summonde befor the king and his consal. Ordinance regarding the disobedience of parties summoned before the king and his council. (Repealed by Statute Law Revision (Scotland) Act 1906 (6 Edw. 7. c. 38))

=== Sources ===
- Alexander, William (1841). "Acta Parliamentorum Regis Jacobi Secundi". An Abridgement of the Acts of the Parliaments of Scotland. Edinburgh: Adam and Charles Black. pp. 440–441 – via Google Books.
- Alexander, William (1841). "Acta Parliamentorum Regis Jacobi Secundi". An Abridgement of the Acts of the Parliaments of Scotland. Edinburgh: Adam and Charles Black. pp. 440–441 – via Google Books.
- Chronological Table of the Statutes. London: Her Majesty's Stationery Office. 1972. pp. 1317–1318 – via Google Books.
- "Acts of the Old Scottish Parliament: 1449". legislation.gov.uk. The National Archives.
- "Index of Statutes: James II (1437-1460)". Records of the Parliaments of Scotland to 1707. University of St Andrews.

== See also ==
- List of legislation in the United Kingdom
- Records of the Parliaments of Scotland
