= Kaspar von Breitenlandenberg =

German prince-abbot

Kaspar von Breitenlandenberg (died 24 April 1463 in Konstanz) was prince abbot of the Abbey of Saint Gall from 1442 to 1463. He descended from a noble family from the Canton of Thurgau. His father was Rudolf V von Breitenlandenberg (Landenberg).

Von Breitenlandenberg joined Reichenau Abbey in 1439, he took his religious vows there and then moved to Bologna to study canon law. After his return on 18 June 1442, he was appointed Abbot of Saint Gall by Pope Eugene IV. He received the bishop consecration on 24 September of the same year. Von Breitenlandenberg was considered a very educated man and was highly esteemed among the nobility. Thus, he became one of the presidents of the provincial chapter of the Benedictine order in Mainz and Bamberg. In later years, he held the office of treasurer of the chapter.

The city of Saint Gall, whose feudal lord Von Breitenlandenberg was, refused to pay him homage as he wanted to enforce old claims of ownership which the citizens were no longer willing to grant him. Emperor Frederick III, the Swiss people and several nobles were in the subsequent tedious dispute for the independence of the city alternately appealed to by both parties. On 17 August 1451, the abbot formed an eternally valid land law with the confederal cities of Zurich, Lucerne, Schwyz and Glarus. The lawsuit was only settled in 1457, however, thanks to the intermediation of Bern. The abbot was able to keep most of his rights, but the city had the possibility to buy them from him. On 14 May 1457, the city paid the amount of 7000 gulden and thus became a free imperial city. This was not the last of Kaspar von Breitenlandenberg’s trials, however. Already for quite some time, the monks of the abbey had accused him of mismanagement and agreements with the opposite party. His opinion regarding the rights of the city had in the course of the negotiations changed more and more in the city's favour, and eventually, he wanted to leave them all the sovereign rights of the monastery for only 1000 gulden, which, however, the convent was able to prevent. In November 1457, the abbot was definitely deprived of the administration of the abbey. The administration of finances had already been in the hands of his successor, Ulrich Rösch, for some time.

Von Breitenlandenberg spent the last years of his life chiefly in Reichenau or in Konstanz. He died on 24 April 1463 in Konstanz, but was buried in Saint Gall. During his reign, the convent counted more members than during the whole of the previous century.

== Reading list ==
- Gössi, Anton: St. Gallen - Äbte: Kaspar von Breitenlandenberg, 1442-1463. in: Helvetia Sacra. III: Die Orden mit Benediktinerregel. 2/1: Frühe Klöster, die Benediktiner und Benediktinerinnen in der Schweiz. Francke Verlag, Bern 1986, p. 1317-19.
