= Antonia di Paolo di Dono =

Italian artist (1456–1491)

Antonia di Paolo di Dono (1456–1491) was an Italian artist. She was the daughter of Paolo di Dono, nicknamed Uccello, a well-known early Renaissance Florentine painter. Giorgio Vasari's biography of Uccello states that he had "a daughter who knew how to draw." Antonia was recorded in the Libro dei Morti (Book of the Dead) of the painter's guild, Arte dei Medici e Speziali, as a "pittoressa." This was the first time the feminine form of the word "painter" appears in Florentine public records and the first formal recognition of a fifteenth-century woman artist.

== Life ==
Antonia was born to Paolo di Dono and his wife Tomasa di Benedetto dei Malifici on Via della Scala in Florence. She was baptized in the Florence Baptistery on October 13, 1456. Her grandfather, a barber-surgeon, had immigrated from Pratovecchio and was of middle social status, whereas her grandmother belonged to the old Florentine del Beccuto family. Following custom, Antonia was named for her grandmother. Her brother Donato was also an artist, and both of them continued in the family tradition. Around the age of 10–13 (1466–1469) she probably left home to join a Carmelite religious community. Her father's 1469 tax return declared that he was old, could not work, and his wife was sick. His testament in 1475 does not mention his daughter Antonia or any convent donations. She may not have been an enclosed nun when he died. The Florentine Carmelites began with pious women living near the church of Santa Maria del Carmine. As the community grew, the prior went to Rome and asked Pope Nicholas V for permission to have Carmelite sisters. The Pope licensed the female branch of the Carmelites in 1452. Santa Maria degli Angeli (on the site of San Frediano in Cestello) was founded c. 1450–1460, and the smaller Nunziatina house appeared in May 1453. The women worked and prayed together, attending religious services at the Carmine, but were not yet subject to enclosure. Between 1479 and 1482, they were granted the scapular and adopted the enclosed lifestyle. Therefore, Antonia entered a Carmelite tertiary or lay sisters community by 1469 and became an enclosed nun in the last decade of her life (c. 1482–1491). According to the Libro dei Morti, she died on 9 February 1491.

== Works ==
There are no known signed or documented artworks by Antonia. Several small-scale devotional paintings from Paolo Uccello's workshop have been attributed to her when she was identified as the "Karlsruhe Master," but most scholars now reject this hypothesis. These include the Adoration (Karlsruhe, Germany), the Hyland Madonna, dated 1470–1475 (The J. Paul Getty Museum, Malibu), the Thebaid (Academy Gallery, Florence), and a predella from the Beata Giulia of Certaldo Altarpiece (Museum of Sacred Art, Church of Saints Jacopo and Filippo, Certaldo). The miniature "Vestition of Novices from the Vecchietti Family" from San Donato Polverosa, Florence (Uffizi Gallery, Florence) was thought to have Antonia's signature, but it is now recognized as the pledge of profession for a Benedictine nun in 1501. So far, the most reasonable hypothesis is that she helped her father after he closed his workshop in 1469–1475. She likely supplied drawings of small figures of saints, clothing details, or animals for Uccello's later cassoni and, after his death, continued to provide drawings to other cassoni furniture workshops. Her art was collaborative and created in support of male artists, but she was sufficiently well known to have been publicly recognized as a woman painter.
