= Jonathan Harris (historian) =

Professor of the History of Byzantium at Royal Holloway, University of Londo

Jonathan Harris is professor of the History of Byzantium at Royal Holloway, University of London. Harris's research is in the area of "Byzantine History 900–1460; relations between Byzantium and the west, especially during the Crusades and the Italian Renaissance; the Greek diaspora after 1453". His first novel, Theosis, was published in 2023.

== Selected publications ==
- Byzantine Sources for the Crusades, 1095-1204, Abingdon and New York: Routledge, 2024
- Theosis, Budapest: Trivent, 2023
- Byzantium and the Crusades, 3rd ed., London and New York: Bloomsbury, 2022 (translated with Chatzelis, G.)
- Introduction to Byzantium (602-1453), Abingdon and New York: Routledge, 2020
- Constantinople: Capital of Byzantium, 2nd ed., London and New York: Bloomsbury, 2017
- A Tenth-Century Byzantine Military Manual: The Sylloge Tacticorum, Abingdon and New York: Routledge, 2017 (translated with Chatzelis, G.)
- The Lost World of Byzantium, New Haven CT and London: Yale University Press, 2015
- Byzantines, Latins and Turks in the Eastern Mediterranean World after 1150, Oxford: Oxford University Press, 2012 (edited with Holmes, C. & Russell, E.)
- The End of Byzantium, New Haven CT and London: Yale University Press, 2010
- Palgrave Advances in Byzantine History, Basingstoke and New York: Palgrave Macmillan, 2005 (editor)
