= University of Valence =

The University of Valence was founded 26 July 1452, by letters patent from the Dauphin Louis, afterwards Louis XI of France, in a move to develop the city of Valence, then part of his domain of Dauphiné. It existed until the French Revolution.

== History ==
Pope Pius II approved its erection in the papal bull of 3 May 1459. In February 1541, the Canon Pierre Morel opened a college for thirteen poor students.

In the 16th century, Valence was famous for its teaching of law, entrusted to Italian professors or to those who had studied in Italy. The Portuguese jurist António de Gouveia taught at Valence, 1554–55; the French jurist, Jacques Cujas (1522–90), from December 1557 to 1559; and François Hotman from the end of 1562 until August 1568. It was at the instigation of Hotman that Bishop Jean de Monluc obtained from Charles IX of France the Edict of 8 April 1565, which united the University of Grenoble with Valence.

Cujas again filled a chair at Valence, August 1567–1575; he had among his auditors Joseph Justus Scaliger, the historian Jacques Auguste de Thou, and the jurist Pierre Pithou. At this time, the university was known for its "Protestant tendencies". Hotman was a determined Protestant; Cujas passed from Protestantism to Catholicism, but it is doubtful if his conversion was inspired entirely from religious motives. Consequently, in 1575, Montluc founded at Valence a college of Jesuits, but this was of short duration.

In the 17th and 18th centuries, the University of Valence was of only minor importance. From 1738 to 1764, its transfer to Grenoble was contemplated but this project was abandoned. Its operations ceased at the time of the French Revolution.

== See also ==
- List of medieval universities
