= Leases Act 1449 =

- Act of Parliament
- Parliament of Scotland
- Long title: Of takis of landis for termes and takis of wedset landis eftir the oute quyting of the lande.
- Citation: 1449 c. 6 [12mo ed: 1449 c. 18]

Dates
- Royal assent: 19 January 1450

Other legislation
- Amended by: Statute Law Revision (Scotland) Act 1906

Status: Amended

Text of the Leases Act 1449 as in force today (including any amendments) within the United Kingdom, from legislation.gov.uk.

The Leases Act 1449 (c. 6) is an act of the Parliament of Scotland.

It sets forth obligations between tenants and landlords. One such example is that is protects tenants from transfers by their landlord; whether that is a real right, or a fully fledged right is disputed.
