= María de Ajofrín =

Spanish Hieronymite visionary (c. 1455–1489)

María de Ajofrín (1455?–1489) was a Spanish beata of the Hieronymite order who became a well-known visionary throughout the fifteenth century.

== Early life ==
María de Ajofrín was born sometime between the years of 1455–59. She was the daughter of Pero Martin Maestro and Marina García, two well-off commoners from the town of Ajofrín near Toledo, Spain. María had many suitors growing up, but at the young age of 13 she made a vow of chastity and was determined to enter a religious life. This was seen as a heroic act, and despite her parents' numerous attempts to marry her off, María resisted "with the strength of a man". As marriage was the ideal choice as a middle-class women in this time period her family began to detest her as she continuously requested to enter into a religious life. Finally, María convinced her father to take her to a cathedral in Toledo. María was instantly inspired to join the Hieronymite order, and joined the convent when she was 15 years old.

She joined a religious institute called "Casa de María García" after its founder, which eventually came to be known as the convent of San Pablo (Note: María García actually founded the Hieronymite order.). Since, at her time of entering, this was a lay residence and not an official convent, the women who lived here were not nuns but beatas, or women who made a private vow of chastity and followed a religious rule of some kind. Although the beatas of the “casa de María García” were subject to the prior of the Hieronymite monastery of La Sisla, the residence was not fully incorporated into the Hieronymite order until 1506.

While in the convent María de Ajofrín spoke of her visions and her religious ideals to her confessor, Juan de Corrales, who in turn wrote a biography about her life. Corrales' text serves as an eyewitness account to the events of María's life, but there has been some question of validity due to the context. Raquel Trillia has suggested that since this biography emanates from a man of power, it has to be read cautiously as the purpose of Corrales was not to tell of María but instead to enhance God's greatness and protect the orthodoxy of religion as well as the ministerial role of the priest in the Church. (Note: Translated from “Tanto para Corrales como para Sigüenza, sus textos sirven dos propó-sitos: realzar la grandeza de Dios y, más importante, proteger la ortodoxia de la religión y el papel ministerial del sacerdote dentro de la Iglesia.”) María de Ajofrín had another text written by José de Sigüenza after her death, that recounts Corrales' story with some additional ones. His text is called Historia de la Orden de San Jerónimo.

== Mystics ==
Christian women were not able to be ordained or administer the sacraments, but they found an opportunity to gain authority in the church through prophecy. It was recognized by Thomas Aquinas that prophecy is a gift straight from God, independent of church intervention, and therefore gender was irrelevant. According to Elizabeth Petroff, it is therefore not too surprising that Christian mysticism consisted mostly of women. Men of this time period had many religious options and abilities for leadership that women did not share. Women who wanted to live a religious life had one main option and that was to join a convent, where women would be cloistered from the world. Petroff suggest that this one option offers an opportunity for the development of mysticism and leadership abilities for women. Virginity or chastity was seen as a necessary prerequisite in order to have credible mystical vision. Cardinal Cisneros, confessor to Queen Isabella, supported female spirituality and female visionaries and encouraged women to teach men through their prophecies.

== Visions ==
Gwenfair Adams describes visions as “events that were believed to involve direct encounters with or communications from the supernatural world”. A vision could be experienced by anyone, anywhere at any time. Generally, visions of the medieval time period had some type of religious, supernatural component consisting of a saint, angel, ghost or demon. It is unclear exactly how many visions María de Ajofrín had throughout her life, but majority of those which Corralez cites centralize around the theme of the immoral clergy in need of reform. María experienced her first vision in 1484, but first had to establish her credibility before the clergy took her visions as honest words from God.

On the day of Ascension in 1484 María received a vision in which she saw a cloister with five doors sculpted with the Annunciation. A procession of priests emerged from each door and into another building, where the clergymen prostrated themselves before an altar singing the Gloria. The Virgin Mary was holding Jesus at the altar, and addressed the clergymen by saying,

“Behold the fruit of my womb. Take it and eat it, for he is crucified every day in five ways at the hands of immoral priests: first, out of lack of faith; second, by greed the goods of the earth; third, on account of lust; fourth, through ignorance of simpleminded and stupid priests who do not know how to distinguish between leprosy and leprosy; fifth, because of the little veneration they show their God after they have received him. My Son's flesh is consumed with less reverence by unworthy priests than the bread that is thrown to the dogs." (Note: Translated from, “Veis aquí hombres el Fruto de mi vientre, tomadlo y comedlo. En cinco diferentes maneras es cada día crucificado, por las manos de los malos sacerdotes: la primera por mengua de la Fe; la segunda, por la codicia de los bienes de la tierra; la tercera, por el vicio torpe de la lujuria; la cuarta, por ignorancia, que ni saben lo que a sus ministerios conviene, ni los misterios que tratan, ni procuran entender sus obligaciones; y la quinta, por la poca reverencia que tiene a su Dios y mi Hijo, después que le han recibido: así le tratan como si fuese el pan que echan a los perros.”)

After the Virgin's speech, at the moment of the Consecration, the Virgin placed the Child into priest's hands, where the Infant changed into a host. Another priest, the recently deceased chaplain of the convent where María lived, came up to her and explained that what she has seen refers to those who receive the form of Eucharist but do not participate in its fruits. Her vision ends as the priest orders her to reveal all she has seen to her confessor, so he may then reveal it to the dean and the capellan mayor of the Cathedral of Toledo.

After speaking with her confessor about this, and other visions, he reminded her that even the Jews demanded signs from Christ before they would believe, suggesting that he was not convinced, and therefore the mayor also wouldn't be. He then suggested to her that if she were to receive a divine sign of some sort, the members of the hierarchy may then be more inclined to believe him. (Note: Surtz suggests that it was difficult for her confessor to believe her initially because it put his own reputation at risk. He did not want to fall into "female fantasies.")

Surtz advises that this vision is a prime example of the theme of clerical immorality experienced by the male ecclesiastical hierarchy in Toledo. Surtz also mentions a few key details about this vision in relation to women in religion. Mary's gesture of offering the flesh of God to ordinary mortals gives her a priestly function. Surtz argues that this representation of Mary indicates the possibility of women assuming the sacerdotal roles abdicated by unworthy males. Surtz also makes a point to mention that even though this vision questions the morality of priests it does not attack the principle of clerical authority. Furthermore, he says that this vision indicates that women are thus untainted by the stigma of immorality and consequently are authorized to participate in priestly functions alongside alternatives to the priesthood such as in visionary experiences.

This idea of women in comparison to priests is significant in relation to the time period. Most women of the age who wished to lead a religious life were constricted to cloistered monasteries as nuns or beguines. Women of this time period were not allowed to administer services, so the idea that the Virgin Mary, a woman, is fulfilling this role is unlike the norm. No woman of the time was thought of as an equal to any member of the clergy, which makes María de Ajofrín stand out from other religious women.

The vision that established María's credibility occurred on All Saints' Day in 1484. As she received Communion, she felt intense pain and cried out as a blade wound appeared on her forehead. After Communion, María had a vision of Christ enthroned and holding a double-edged sword in his mouth. She was told that the sword represents his anger at the clergy, and she was ordered to reveal this to the bishops already indicated to her. Specifically, she was to tell the archbishop of Toledo to eradicate the five sins (Note: Five sins of the clergy are lack of faith, greed, lust, ignorance and lack of reverence for sacred things.) by which immoral clergymen were daily crucifying God. More so, the archbishop should extirpate the heresies that flourished in Toledo and forbid the saying of Mass in private homes. In order to ensure that María would be believed, the sword that Christ held would pierce her heart and the blood that flowed would serve as a living testimony.

As promised, María experienced intense pain after the vision, as blood flowed from an open wound in her heart. Upon seeing the wound, her confessor summoned the dean, the capellan mayor and other witness including a notary public, to attest to the marvel. The confessor ordered a notarial document be drawn up to record the sight. It was at this point in time when her confessor began to trust her visions. Following this trust, he wrote a letter to the archbishop of Toledo, Cardinal Pedro González de Mendoza who replied with a letter saying he believed in María's holiness, and would no longer question her visions.

Surtz indicated that the wound on María's breast was a replication of the Passion of Christ, which was a crucial element in the construction of María's holiness. This wound was a physical imitation of Christ's suffering, and was frequently experienced by women in the late Middle Ages. The corporal manifestations of that imitation were eminently readable by women's contemporaries who interpreted them as a sign of sanctity. At this time, the injury alone was insufficient until it was validated by the male written word, indicating the typical male-dominated stereotype of the time period.

== Significance ==
In one particular vision she received in 1488, Christ adamantly instructed her to encourage the Inquisition to pursue heretics. This vision had strong relevance in the late fifteenth century because the city had a large Jewish population and the mass conversions of the late fourteenth century led to a large population of converted Jews, or New Christians. Many New Christians were sincere in their new faith, but many others were Judaizers, reverting to their old Jewish practices.

Corralez states that María's visions gave her a moral obligation to eradicate even the slightest sight of heresy, which caused her to be a witness during the trial of one of the Judaizing monks. Implantation of the Inquisition in Toledo was recorded as being a struggle, and María de Ajofrín's role in its establishment is not entirely clear. However, Surtz suggests that she did manage to convey to the Church hierarchy God's divine approval of the tribunal's rigorous extinction of heresy.

Surtz also advocates that María's visions about the Inquisition served at a very opportunistic time. While the church was attempting to implement the new policies that came along with the Inquisition, María's visions provided validation from God. María's visions allowed the Church to further its own political agendas and in turn, María's usefulness was awarded with authentication from the ecclesiastical hierarchy, which empowered her as a female in society.

María de Ajofrín died on July 18, 1489.
