= Estefania Carròs i de Mur =

Estefania Carròs i de Mur (1455 – March 16, 1511), was a Catalan educator.

She was born to Brianda de Mur and Nicolau Carròs i d’Arborea, who was viceroy of Sardinia from 1461 to 1478. When her parents moved to Sardinia, she was left in the care of her aunt Isabel de Mur, who was a lady-in-waiting to queen Juana Enriquez and a governess of princess Joanna. Estefania Carròs did not wish to marry nor become a nun, the two accepted choices for a noblewoman. Instead, she settled in a house owned by her father at Plaza de Santa Ana in Barcelona, where she established a secular school for girls from the nobility and the burgher class. Juana de Aragón (1469 – 1510), illegitimate daughter of Ferdinand II of Aragon, was one of her students. Her initiative was unusual for her time - in this period, schools for girls were normally convent schools. She was evidently respected at her school and had a large network of female co-workers and supporters.
