= Angelo da Vallombrosa =

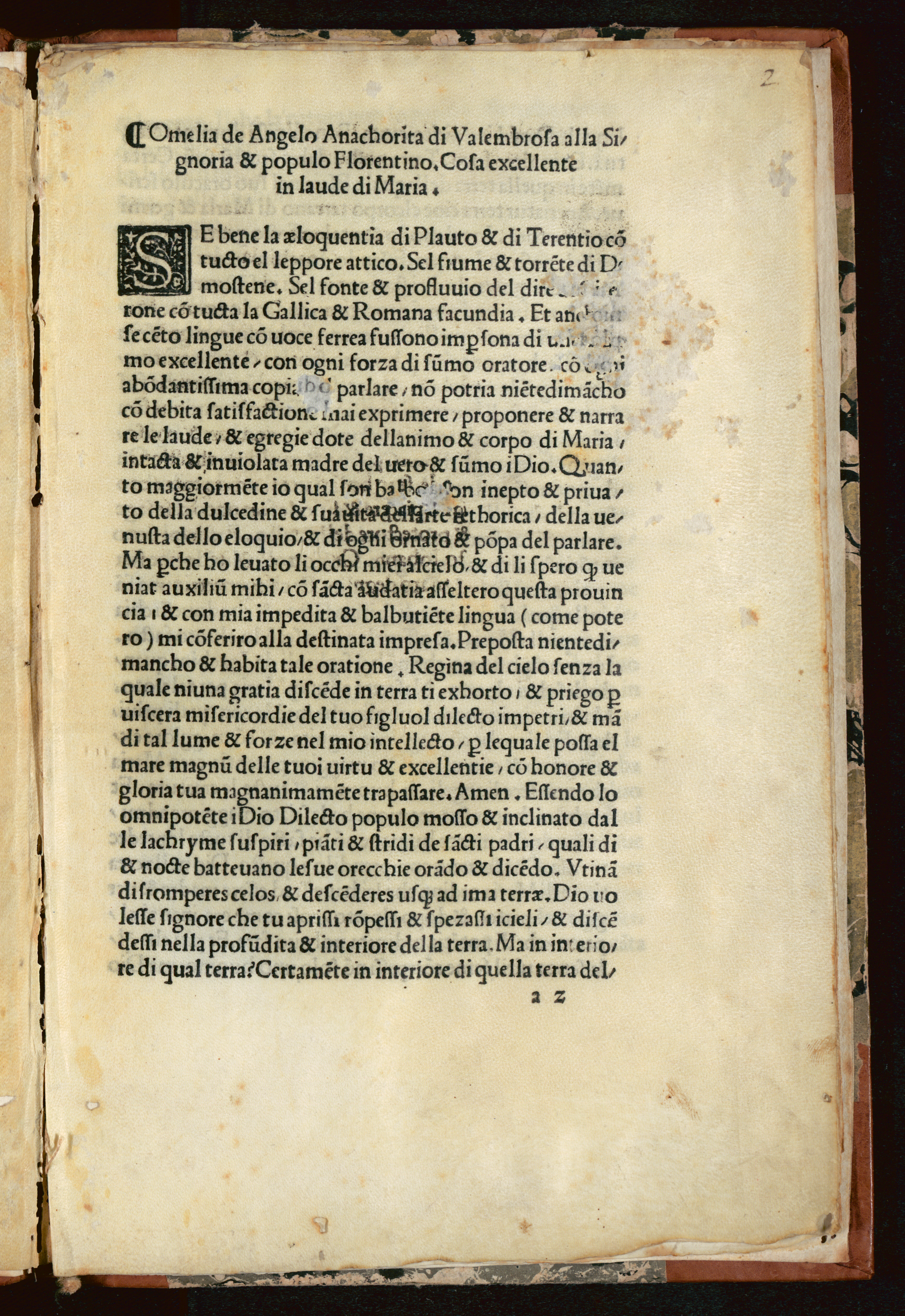
Omelia in laude di Maria, circa 1500

Angelo da Vallombrosa or Angelus Anachorita Vallombrosa (1455–1530) was an Italian jurist and abbot.

== Life ==
He was a counsellor of the Roman Rota and was ordained on January 15, 1488 in the monastery of S. Prassede (Rome), by the general of the Vallumbrosan Order, Biagio Milanesi.

He was appointed vicar at the pieve Montemignaio (Toscany) and the santa Cecilia della Corvara abbay in Bologna

He then obtained the Perpetual Vicar of the Montemignaio Pieve in Tuscany, and the Abbey of Santa Cecilia of Corvara near Bologna, but settled in Vallombrosa (Florence) in 1496.

He wrote numerous invectives, many of which against Girolamo Savonarola theories.

When he died in 1530, Ilario Alcei wrote an epigram in couplet that was engraved on his grave.

== Works ==
- Angelo da Vallombrosa (1496). Epistola ai Fiorentini (in Italian). Firenze: Johann Petri, Lorenzo Morgiani.
- Angelo da Vallombrosa (1496). Epistola alle matrone e donne fiorentine (in Italian). Firenze: Bartolomeo de' Libri.
- Angelo da Vallombrosa (1496). Epistola sullo stato della Chiesa (in Italian). Firenze: Lorenzo Morgiani e Johann Petri.
- Angelo da Vallombrosa (1497). Epistola ai frati usciti di San Marco di Firenze (in Italian). Firenze: Lorenzo Morgiani, Johann Petri.
- Angelo da Vallombrosa (1497). Epistola al Doge e al Senato veneto (in Italian). Firenze: Lorenzo Morgiani, Johann Petri.
- Angelo da Vallombrosa (1497). Replica alla risposta dei frati di San Marco di Firenze (in Italian). Firenze: Lorenzo Morgiani, Johann Petri.
- Angelo da Vallombrosa (1500). Omelia in laude di Maria (in Italian). Firenze: Lorenzo Morgiani, Johann Petri.
