= Nicholas Radford =

Member of the Parliament of England

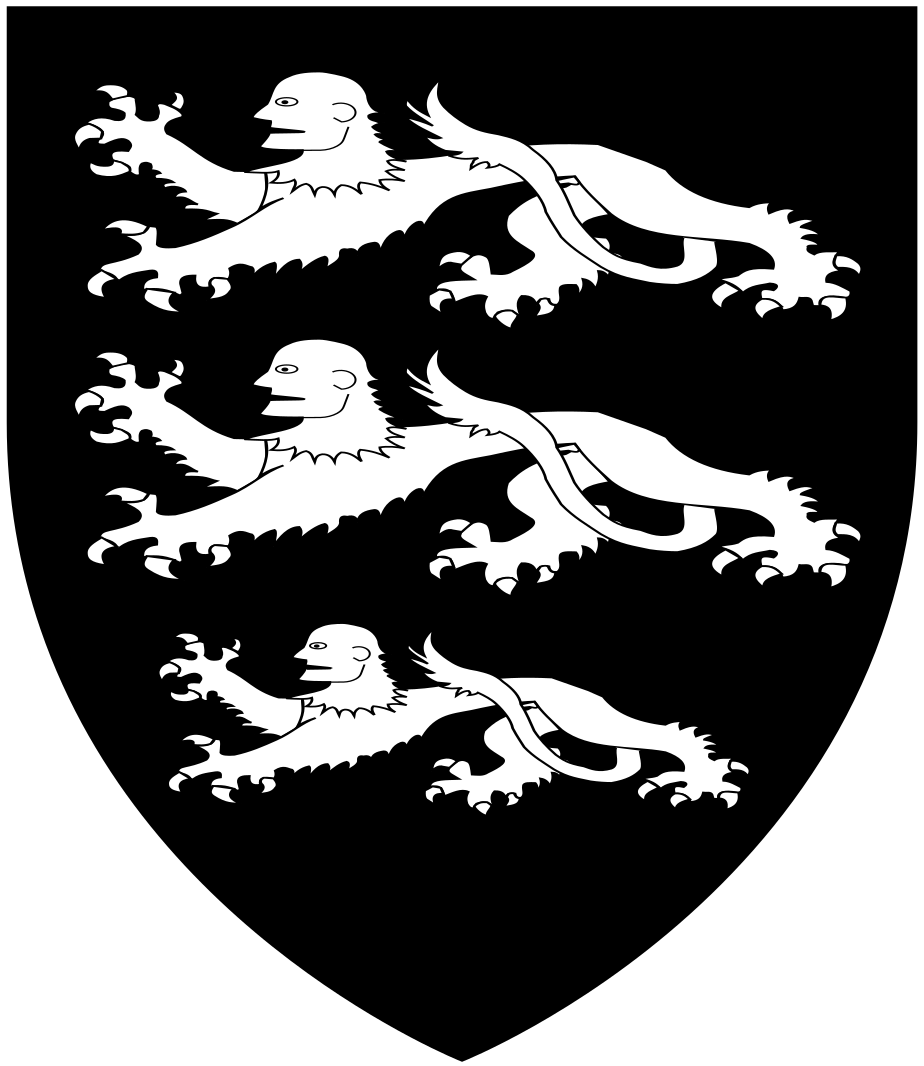
Arms of Radford: Sable, three lampagoes passant coward in pale argent

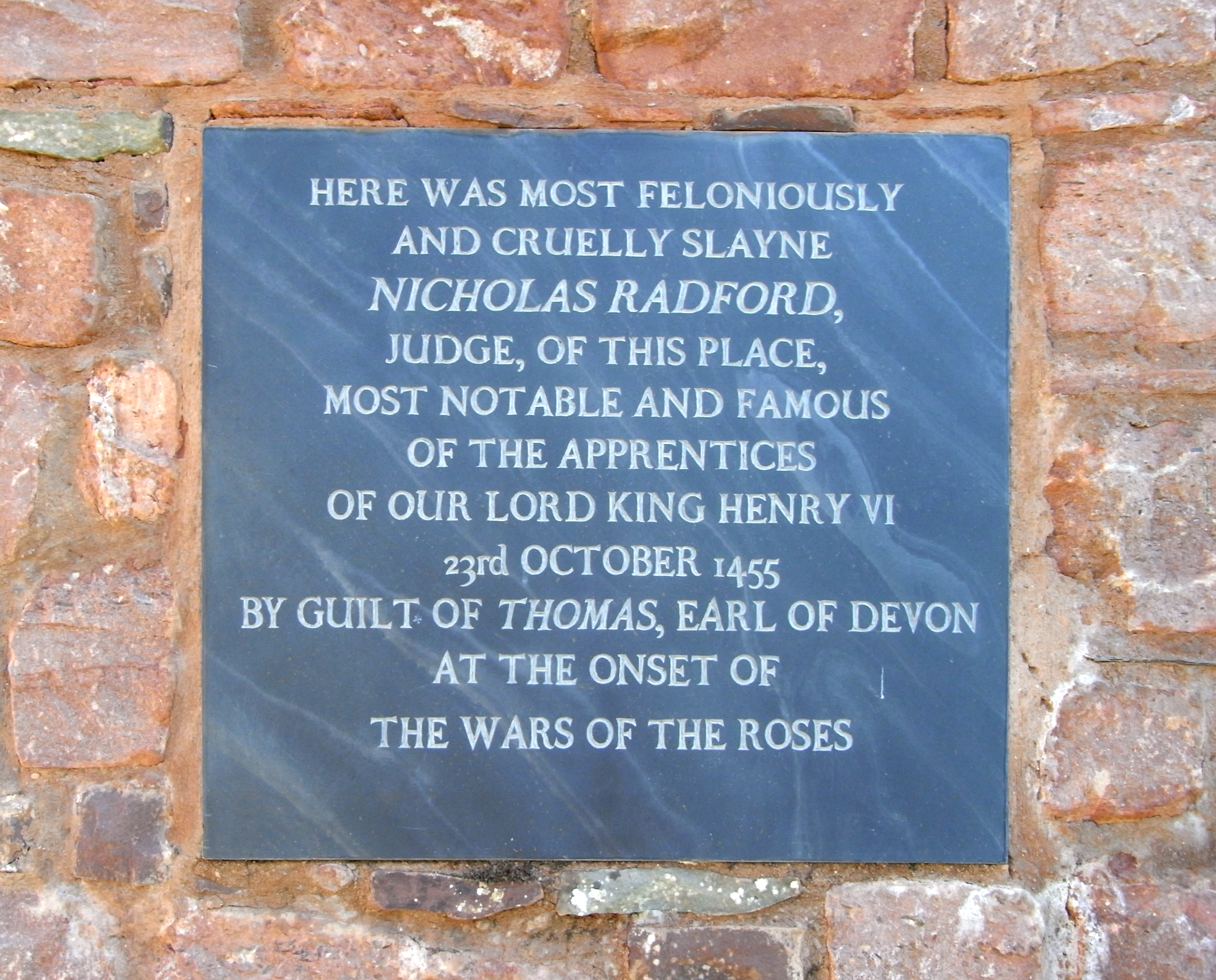
Inscribed slate tablet at Upcott Barton, composed and erected by the owner circa 2015

Nicholas Radford (c. 1385 – 23 October 1455) of Upcott in the parish of Cheriton Fitzpaine, and of Poughill, Devon, was a prominent lawyer in the West Country who served as Member of Parliament for Lyme Regis, Dorset (May 1421) and Devon (1435). During the anarchic times of the Wars of the Roses he was caught up in the dynastic West Country rivalry between Thomas de Courtenay, 5th Earl of Devon, of Tiverton Castle, for whom during his minority he had acted as steward, and William Bonville, 1st Baron Bonville, of Shute. His murder in 1455 by the Earl's faction "ranks among the most notorious crimes of the century", and was the precursor of the Battle of Clyst Heath (1455) fought shortly thereafter near Exeter by the private armies of the two magnates. He served as a Justice of the Peace for Devon (1424-1455), as Escheator for Devon and Cornwall (1435-6), Recorder of Exeter (1442-1455) and as Tax Collector for Devon in 1450 and as Apprentice-at-law for the Duchy of Lancaster (1439-1455).

== Origins ==
He was the son of Robert Radford, and Thomasina Wyke of Oakford, Devon. According to Risdon (d.1640), he was a descendant of the de Radford family of the estate of Radford, in the parish of Winkleigh, Devon, who had changed their name from de Bickly, after Robert de Bickly, son of Ralph Borne, had during the reign of King Richard I (1199-1299) been granted the estate of Radford by Oliver de Tracy, feudal baron of Barnstaple. According to Pole the arms of Radford of Radford were: Sable, three lampagoes (man tigers with lion's bodies and man's faces) passant in pale coward argent.

== Steward of Earl of Devon ==
In 1423 he was appointed by the royal council as joint steward (with John II Copleston (d.1457) of Copplestone, thrice MP for Devon, Escheator of Devon and Cornwall) of the vast estates of the infant Thomas de Courtenay, 5th/13th Earl of Devon (1414–1458), ward of the king and son and heir of the magnate Hugh de Courtenay, 4th/12th Earl of Devon (1389–1422). The 5th/13th Earl reached his majority of 21 in 1435, after which Radford still remained friends with him and was chosen by the earl to be a godfather to his second son Henry Courtenay.

== Marriage ==
At some time before 1431, he married a certain Thomasina Wyke, by whom he had a son, Nicholas Jnr, born in 1437 in Poughill, Devon. Nicholas Jnr married Ursula Sufcote and they had a son, William.

== Murder by Courtenay faction ==
The facts surrounding Radford's murder are recorded in the petition for justice made by his executor John Radford to King Henry VI, preserved in the National Archives at Kew and summarised contemporaneously as follows:

Petition stating that Nicholas Radford was a justice of the Peace by the king's commission and was possessed of great zeal to pursue evil-doers. On Thursday 23 October in 34th year of the reign, Radford was at his place called Uppecote in Cadleleigh and was in the king's peace, and Thomas Courtenay came with others bearing arms and attacked Radford's place and set the gates of the place on fire. Radford came and admitted them after Courtenay (said) that he and his goods would be preserved. While Courtenay distracted Radford, the men stripped the place, turning Radford's sick wife out of bed and carrying all away. Afterwards Courtenay said that he had to take Radford to his father and then departed. Philip and the others then struck Radford on the head with a glaive so that his brain fell out and cut his throat. Afterwards at his burial when his body lay in his chapel, Henry Courtenay came with others and took upon him the office of coroner and held an inquest without authority. Afterwards they cast his body from the coffin into the grave and threw the stones conveyed there for Radford's tomb onto the body crushing it. Justice is requested for the ... so that an example is not set if the murder, felony and robbery pass unpunished".

The petition is endorsed by the king in the standard form of acceptance: "Let it be done as he requests".

=== Paston Letters narrative ===
Several contemporary accounts record in tones of shock and horror, unusual during the times of blunted sensitivities of the fifteenth century, this murder and the following mock-funeral and coroner's inquest accompanied by the singing of highly inappropriate songs. The Paston Letters include a letter dated 28 October 1455 from James Gresham to John Paston as follows:

"Also there is gret varyance bytwene the Erll of Devenshire and the Lord Bonvyle, as hath be many day, and meche debat is like to growe therby; for on Thursday at nyght last passed, the Erll of Denshyres sone and heir come with LX men of armes to Radford's place in Devenshire, whiche was of counseil with my Lord Bonvyle; and they sette an hous on fyer at Radford's gate, and cryed and mad an noyse as though they had be sory for the fyer; and by that cause Radford's men set opyn the gats and yede owt to se the fyer; and for with th'erll sone forseid entred into the place and intreted Radford to come doun of his chambre to sp[e]ke with them, promyttyng hym that he shuld no bodyly harm have; up on whiche promysse he come doun, and spak with the seid Erll sone. In the mene tyme his menye robbe his chambre, and ryfled his huches and trussed suyche as they coude gete to gydder, and caryed it awey on his own hors. Thanne th'erll sone seid, "Radford, thou must come to my lord my fadir". He seid he wold, and bad oon of his men make redy his hors to ride with hem, whiche answerd hym that alle his hors wern take awey; thanne he seid to th'erll sone, "Sir, your men have robbed my chambre, and thei have myn hors, that I may not ride with you to my lord your fadir, wherfor, I pray you, lete me ride, for I am old, and may not go." It was answerid hym ageyn, that he shuld walke forth with them on his feete; and so he dede till he was a flyte shote or more from his place, and thanne he was ... softly, for cawse he myght not go fast. And whanne thei were thus departed, he turned ... oon; forwith come IX men ageyn up on hym, and smot hym in the hed, and fellid ... of them kyt his thirote. This was told to my Lord Chaunceler this fornoon ... messengers as come of purpos owt of the same cuntre".

== Succession ==
His heir to Poughill was Roger Prouz (alias Prouse) of Prouz, Devon, apparently his nephew, who inherited his estates. His sister Jone Radford had married Prouse of Prouse, whose later heir general was Guy. His seat of Upcott was however later the seat of James Courtenay, a younger son of Sir William II Courtenay (1451–1512) of Powderham, and brother of Sir William III Courtenay (1477–1535) "The Great", which family during the Wars of the Roses and at the Battle of Clyst Heath (1455) were members of the Bonville faction and were thus enemies of their distant cousins the Courtenay Earls of Devon of Tiverton Castle.

== Landholdings ==
His landholdings included:

- Upcott, Cheriton Fitzpaine, his residence.
- Manor of Poughill (alias Pohill, Podhill, Poghill, etc.), in the parish of Poughill, Devon, near the junction of the Rivers Creedy and Exe, which he acquired in 1429 by conveyance from Robert de Poughill.

== Sources ==
- Woodger, L.S (1993). J.S. Roskell; L. Clark; C. Rawcliffe (eds.). "biography of Radford, Nicholas (d.1455), of Poughill and Upcott Barton, Devon". History of Parliament: the House of Commons 1386-1421. London.
