= Gotō (surname) =

Gotō (後藤, 五藤, 五島), also spelled Gotou or Gotoh, is a Japanese surname. People with the name include:

== Artists ==
- Jin Goto (born 1968), Japanese nihonga painter
- John Goto (born 1949), British artist known for his montage color photography
- Joseph Goto (1920–1994), American sculptor
- Keiichirō Gotō (1918–2004), Japanese photographer
- Goto Yujo (1440–1512), Japanese artisan and sword fitting maker

== Film, television, and video games ==
- Hirohito Gotō (born 1969), Japanese television and stage director
- Hiroki Gotō (born 1985), Japanese voice actor
- Hiroyuki Goto (born 1973), Japanese game designer and pi reciter
- Keiji Gotoh (born 1968), Japanese anime director
- Kenji Goto (1967–2015), Japanese freelance video journalist
- Mai Goto (voice actress) (born 1982), Japanese voice actress
- Risa Goto (born 1983), Japanese actress and gravure idol
- Saori Gotō (born 1987), Japanese voice actress
- Satoshi Goto (born 1971), Japanese voice actor
- Tetsuo Gotō (1950–2018), Japanese voice actor
- Yūko Gotō (born 1975), Japanese voice actress
- Terumoto Gotō (born 1974), Japanese comedian, member of the duo Football Hour
- Toshio Gotō (born 1938), Japanese film director

== Musicians ==
- Kumiko Goto (born 1971), Japanese singer
- Maki Goto (born 1985), Japanese singer in Hello!Project
- Mariko Gotō, 21st-century Japanese singer
- Masafumi Gotoh (born 1976), member of the Japanese rock band Asian Kung-Fu Generation
- Midori Gotō (born 1971), Japanese-born American violinist
- Ryu Gotō (born 1988), Japanese-American violinist
- Suguru Goto, 21st-century Japanese composer and new media artist
- Tsugutoshi Gotō (後藤 次利; born 1952), Japanese musician
- Yukari Goto (後藤 友香里; born 1988), Japanese singer and voice actress

== Government ==
- Fumio Gotō (1884–1980), Japanese politician and theoretician
- Hitoshi Goto (born 1957), Japanese politician, governor of Yamanashi Prefecture
- Gotō Morinori (1840–1875), Japanese daimyō of Fukue Domain in what is now Nagasaki Prefecture
- Gotō Shinpei (1857–1929), Japanese statesman and cabinet member
- Gotō Shōjirō (1838–1897), Japanese politician and leader of the Freedom and People's Rights Movement
- Shigeyuki Goto (born 1955), Japanese politician, Liberal Democratic Party member of the House of Representatives

== Military and samurai ==
- Aritomo Gotō (1888–1942), Imperial Japanese Navy admiral during World War II
- Eiji Gotō (1887–1967), Imperial Japanese Navy admiral during World War II
- Jūrō Gotō (1887–1984), Imperial Japanese Army major general during the Second Sino-Japanese War
- Fusanosuke Gotō (1879–1924), Imperial Japanese Army soldier
- Gotō Mototsugu (1565–1615), Japanese samurai who served the Kuroda and Toyotomi clans
- Goto Nobuyasu (1556–1612), Japanese samurai who served the Uesugi clan

== Sportspeople ==
- Ai Goto (born 1983), Japanese badminton player
- Ayumi Goto (born 1993), Japanese figure skater
- Hideko Goto (後藤 英子), Japanese table tennis player
- Hirooki Goto (born 1979), Japanese professional wrestler
- Kanoko Goto (後藤 鹿子; born 1975), Japanese cross-country skier
- Keisuke Gotō (born 2005), Japanese footballer
- Keita Goto (footballer) (born 1986), Japanese footballer
- Michi Goto (born 1990), Japanese football forward
- Mitsutaka Goto (born 1978), Japanese baseball infielder
- Ryo Goto (born 1986), Japanese football forward
- Shunta Gotoh (born 1993), Japanese baseball outfielder
- Tadaharu Goto (born 1941), Japanese swimmer
- Takasuke Goto (後藤 崇介; born 1985), Japanese footballer
- Tarzan Goto (born Seiji Gotō, 1963), Japanese professional wrestler
- Tatsutoshi Goto (born 1956), Japanese professional wrestler
- Teruya Goto (born 1991), Japanese rugby sevens player
- Toru Goto (born 1934), Japanese freestyle swimmer
- Yoshikazu Goto (born 1964), Japanese football midfielder
- Yuji Goto (born 1985), Japanese football midfielder
- Yukio Goto (died 1976), Japanese football defender
- Yusuke Goto (born 1993), Japanese football forward

== Writers ==
- Ben Goto (born 1929), Japanese documentarist and novelist
- Cassern "Multilaser" Goto (born 1970), American science fiction writer
- Gotō Chūgai (1866–1938), Japanese essayist, novelist and literary critic
- Hiromi Goto (born 1966), Japanese-born Canadian fantasy novelist
- Meisei Goto (1932–1999), Japanese novelist

== Other ==
- Eiichi Goto (1931–2005), Japanese computer scientist
- Gotō Zuigan (1879–1965), Japanese Buddhist Rinzai Zen master
- Katsu Goto (1862–1889), Japanese merchant, interpreter, and lynching victim
- Kazushige Goto, Japanese software engineer known for hand-optimized assembly routines
- Keita Gotō (industrialist) (1882–1959), Japanese businessman, founder of the Tokyu Group
- Kumiko Goto-Azuma, Japanese Antarctic palaeoclimatologist and glaciologist
- Seitarō Gotō (1867–1935), Japanese zoologist and parasitologist
- Tadamasa Goto (born 1942), yakuza boss

== Organizations ==
- Gotoh (1960 - present), Japanese manufacturer of guitar and musical instruments parts

== In fiction ==
- Goto Dengo, a character in the novel Cryptonomicon
- Goto Shinpachi, an interpreter in the novel The Thousand Autumns of Jacob de Zoet by David Mitchell
- Gabriel Goto, a minor character in the Baroque cycle
- Kasumi Goto (Voiced by Kym Hoy), a character from the video game franchise Mass Effect
- The Goto Family, a powerful yakuza family from The Raid 2
  - Hideaki Goto (Kenichi Endō), yakuza boss, father of Keiichi Goto and head of Goto Family
  - Keiichi Goto (Ryuhei Matsuda), son of Hideaki Goto and heir of Goto Family
- Tojiro Goto (Ryousuke Kawamura), a character from the Kamen Rider Fourze
- Gotō Matabei (Voiced by Shinichirō Miki), a character of vídeo game Sengoku Basara 4
- Gotou (Voiced by Kazuhiko Inoue in Japanese and Jason Douglas in English for Anime and played by Tadanobu Asano in the Live-action), the main antagonist of Parasyte franchise.
- Shinichi Goto, the main protagonist from Old Boy.
- Jun Gotō (Voiced by Yuko Ono), one of main protagonists from Angel's 3Piece!
- Moka Gotō (Voiced by Anzu Haruno), one of main characters from Clean Freak! Aoyama kun.
- Hidenori Gotō (Voiced by Tomokazu Sugita), one of main characters from Samurai Flamenco.
- Ren Goto (Voiced by Kazuki Shimizu in Japanese and Chris Smith in English), a character from K Project.
- Kosei Goto (Voiced by Tokuyoshi Kawashima), a character from Giant Killing.
- Takuya Gotou (Voiced by Kenjiro Tsuda), a character from Sound! Euphonium.
- Shintaro Goto (Asaya Kimijima), one of main characters from Kamen Rider OOO.
- Hitori Gotō (Voiced by Yoshino Aoyama), one of main characters from Bocchi the Rock!
