= 1575 =

1575 in various calendars
- Gregorian calendar: 1575; MDLXXV
- Ab urbe condita: 2328
- Armenian calendar: 1024; ԹՎ ՌԻԴ
- Assyrian calendar: 6325
- Balinese saka calendar: 1496–1497
- Bengali calendar: 981–982
- Berber calendar: 2525
- English Regnal year: 17 Eliz. 1 – 18 Eliz. 1
- Buddhist calendar: 2119
- Burmese calendar: 937
- Byzantine calendar: 7083–7084
- Chinese calendar: 甲戌年 (Wood Dog); 4272 or 4065 — to — 乙亥年 (Wood Pig); 4273 or 4066
- Coptic calendar: 1291–1292
- Discordian calendar: 2741
- Ethiopian calendar: 1567–1568
- Hebrew calendar: 5335–5336
- Hindu calendars
- Vikram Samvat: 1631–1632
- Shaka Samvat: 1496–1497
- Kali Yuga: 4675–4676
- Holocene calendar: 11575
- Igbo calendar: 575–576
- Iranian calendar: 953–954
- Islamic calendar: 982–983
- Japanese calendar: Tenshō 3 (天正３年)
- Javanese calendar: 1494–1495
- Julian calendar: 1575; MDLXXV
- Korean calendar: 3908
- Minguo calendar: 337 before ROC 民前337年
- Nanakshahi calendar: 107
- Thai solar calendar: 2117–2118
- Tibetan calendar: ཤིང་ཕོ་ཁྱི་ལོ་ (male Wood-Dog); 1701 or 1320 or 548 — to — ཤིང་མོ་ཕག་ལོ་ (female Wood-Boar); 1702 or 1321 or 549

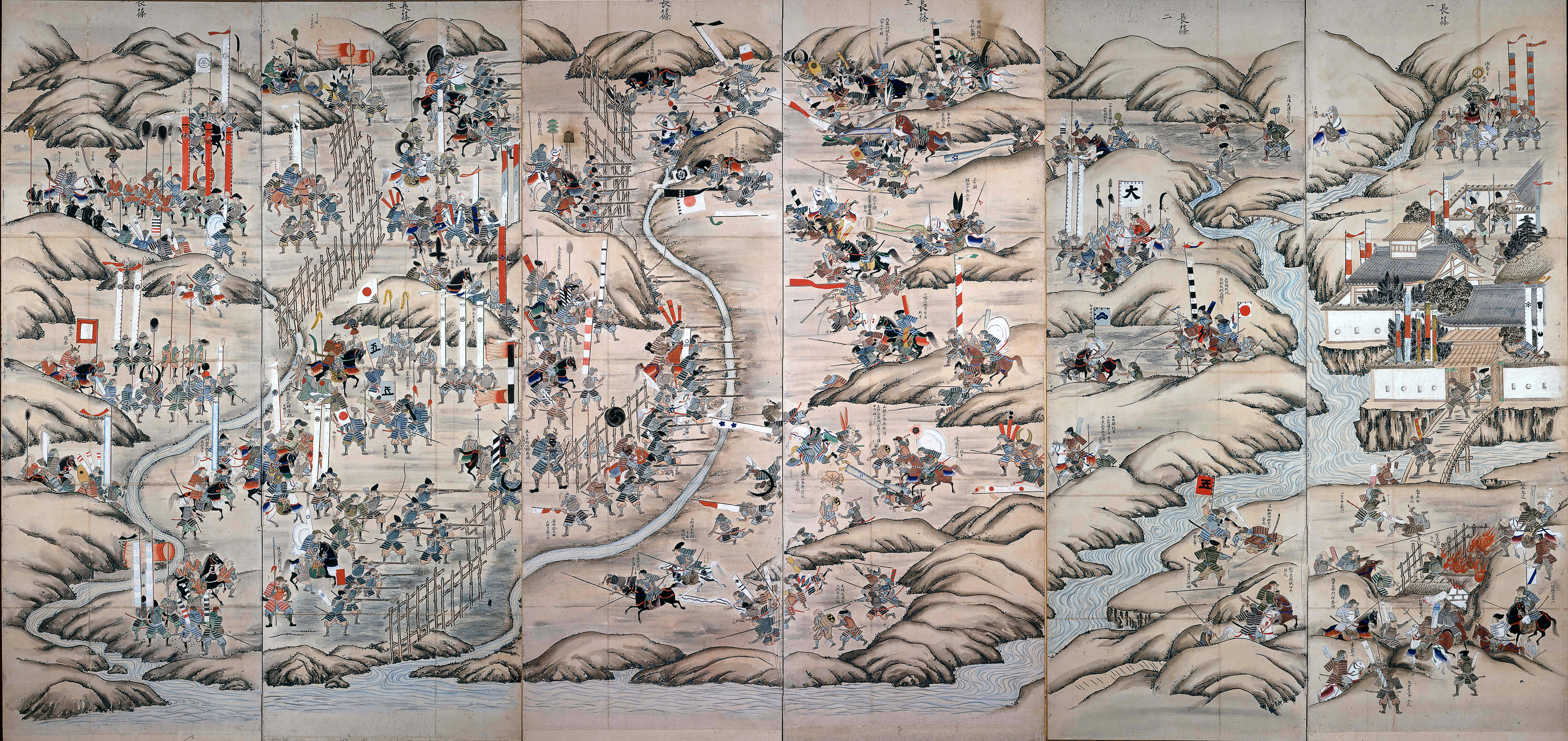
June 28: Battle of Nagashino

Year 1575 (MDLXXV) was a common year starting on Saturday of the Julian calendar.

== Events ==
=== January–March ===
- January 21 – Queen Elizabeth I of England grants a monopoly on producing printed sheet music, to Thomas Tallis and William Byrd.
- February 8 – William I of Orange founds Leiden University.
- February 11 – Portuguese explorer Paulo Dias de Novais arrives in southeastern Africa to colonize what is now Angola.
- February 13 – The formal coronation of Henry III as King of France takes place at the Reims Cathedral. Henry inherited the throne on May 30, 1574, upon the death of his older brother, Charles IX. He marries Louise of Lorraine.
- March 3 – Battle of Tukaroi: The Mughal Empire decisively defeats the Karrani dynasty of Bengal. The battle took place near the village of Tukaroi in present-day Balasore District of Odisha.

=== April–June ===
- April 2 – English privateer Gilbert Horseley and his crew sail into the Bay of Honduras in Central America and conduct three days of raids of Spanish settlements and ships.
- April 6 – Antoine I de Gramont, Lord Sovereign of the Principality of Bidache in the French Pyrennees Mountains, promulgates a legal code for his people.
- April 18 – Bayinnaung, King of Burma, returns to his capital at Pegu from Vientiane after installing Voravongsa I as the Burmese-appointed monarch of the Kingdom of Lan Xang (now Laos).
- May 12 – King Henry III of France, who had been selected in 1573 by the nobles of Poland and Lithuania to be King of Poland as Henryk Walezy, is stripped of his Polish and Lithuanian titles after failing to return to Kraków by the deadline imposed by the Polish nobility.
- May 24 – In an attempt to reform the Eastern Orthodox Church, Lutheran missionaries meet with Jeremias II Tranos, the Ecumenical Patriarch, at his residence in Constantinople, and present him with a Greek translation of the Augsburg Confession. Jeremias sends the missionaries, Jakob Andreae and Martin Crusius, three rebuttals to define the objections he has to the Lutheran document, declaring the reasons why the Eastern Orthodoxy has no desire for reformation.
- June 24 – William the Silent, Prince of Orange, marries Charlotte of Bourbon.
- June 28 – Battle of Nagashino: Oda Nobunaga defeats Takeda Katsuyori in Japan's first modern battle.

=== July–September ===
- July 7 – Raid of the Redeswire: Sir John Carmichael defeats Sir John Forster, in the last battle between England and Scotland.
- July 26 – Edmund Grindal succeeds Matthew Parker as Archbishop of Canterbury.
- August 5 – Henry Sidney is appointed Lord Lieutenant of Ireland.
- September 1 –As a result of the Eighty Years' War, the government of the Kingdom of Spain is in bankruptcy and stops paying its troops, beginning in March.
- September 22
  - Paulo Dias de Novais becomes the first Portuguese Governor of Angola.
  - Ottoman forces led by Ferhad Pasha Sokolović defeat the Austrian Army, led by Herbard VIII von Auersperg, in the Battle of Budačka. Auersperg is decapitated and Ferhad Pasha leaves Croatia with the head as a trophy.
- September 25 – At St. Vitus Cathedral in Prague, Rudolf of Habsburg, son of the Holy Roman Emperor Maximilian II, is crowned King of Bohemia by the Archbishop Antonín Brus of Mohelnice.
- September 26 – Future Spanish author and playwright Miguel de Cervantes, then 28, is taken hostage by the Ottoman Albanian pirate Arnaut Mami after an attack on the Spanish galley Sol off of the Catalan coast. Cervantes spends the next five years as a slave in Algeria before his family pays a ransom to free him.

=== October–December ===
- October 10 – Battle of Dormans: Catholic forces under Henry I, Duke of Guise defeat the Protestants, capturing Philippe de Mornay among others.
- October 22 – The city of Villa de la Asunción (today Aguascalientes) is founded in New Spain, by permission from Philip II of Spain.
- November 8 – The Sejm of Poland meets in Warsaw to elect a new King of Poland after King Henryk has failed to return from France, and considers 11 candidates.
- November 9 – Ferhad Pasha Sokolović returns to Constantinople in triumph with the head of General Auersperg as a trophy after his September 22 victory at Budecka.
- November 22 – Portuguese navigator Manuel de Mesquita Perestrelo departs from Mozambique on a mission for to map the coastline, completing the task on March 13.
- December 12 – Under pressure from Papal nuncio Vincenzo Lauro when a majority of the Sejm has still not agreed on a candidate, the Primate of Poland, Jakub Uchański, declares Maximilian II new King of Poland and Grand Duke of Lithuania.
- December 16 – An earthquake hits Valdivia.

=== Date unknown ===
- Russians occupy Pernau in western Estonia, and the fortress of Weissenstein.
- The seat of the Audiencia Real in Chile moves from Concepción to Santiago.
- Abraham Ortelius becomes a geographer to Philip II of Spain.
- The bubonic plague decimates Venice.
- Captains of vessels flying the Spanish flag are legally required to maintain a logbook.
- Venceslaus Agrippa Lituanus is the Great Scribe of Lithuania.

== Births ==
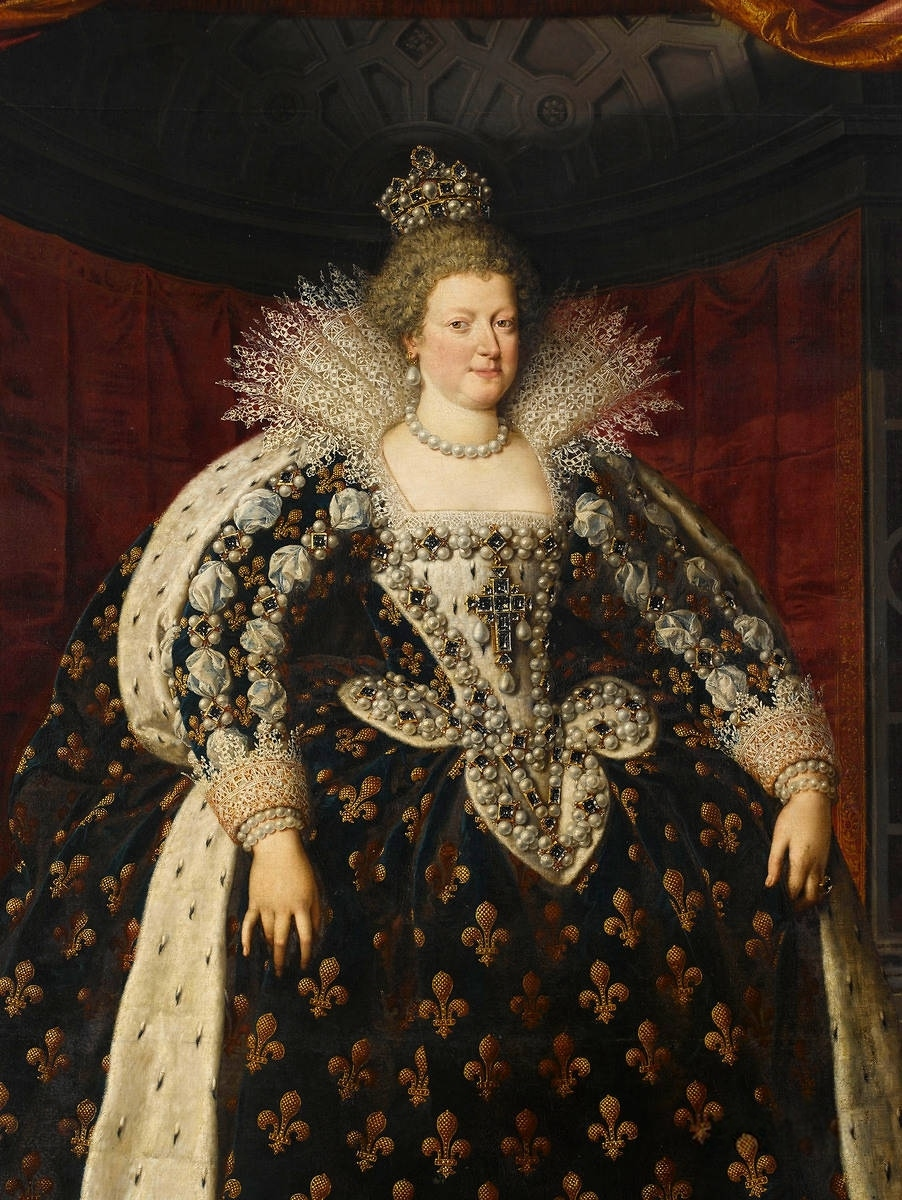
Marie de' Medici

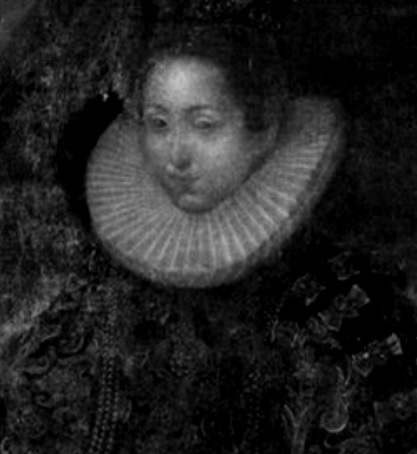
Countess Palatine Anna Maria of Neuburg

- January – Elizabeth Cecil, 16th Baroness de Ros (d. 1591)
- January 22 – Louis III, Cardinal of Guise (d. 1621)
- c. February 3 – Bernard of Wąbrzeźno, Polish Catholic priest and Benedictine monk (d. 1603)
- February 4 – Pierre de Bérulle, French cardinal and statesman (d. 1629)
- February 15 – Louis Gunther of Nassau, Count of Nassau-Katzenelnbogen (d. 1604)
- February 16 – Richard Carpenter, English priest and theologian (d. 1625)
- February 21 – Marten Pepijn, Flemish painter (d. 1643)
- February 27
  - John Adolf, Duke of Holstein-Gottorp (1590–1616) (d. 1616)
  - Anna of Holstein-Gottorp, countess consort of East Frisia (d. 1610)
- April 18 – Frederick Magnus, Count of Erbach-Fürstenau (1606–1618) (d. 1618)
- April 21 – Francesco Molin, Doge of Venice (d. 1655)
- April 26 – Marie de' Medici, queen of Henry IV of France (d. 1642)
- May 20 – Robert Heath, English judge and politician (d. 1649)
- May 30 – Diego Salcedo, Spanish bishop (d. 1644)
- June 15 – Lelio Biscia, Italian Catholic cardinal (d. 1638)
- June 24 – William Petre, 2nd Baron Petre, English peer and MP (d. 1637)
- June 26 – Anne Catherine of Brandenburg (d. 1612)
- July 2 – Elizabeth de Vere, Countess of Derby (d. 1627)
- July 11 – Thomas Berkeley, English politician (d. 1611)
- July 14 – Augustus, Prince of Anhalt-Plötzkau, German prince (d. 1653)
- July 28 – Fernando de Valdés y Llanos, Spanish Catholic archbishop (d. 1639)
- July 31 – Simon Steward, English politician (d. 1632)
- August 14 – Robert Hayman, English-born poet (d. 1629)
- August 15 – Diego, Prince of Asturias, Portuguese prince (d. 1582)
- August 18 – Countess Palatine Anna Maria of Neuburg, Duchess of Saxe-Altenburg (d. 1643)
- August 24 – William Burton, British antiquarian (d. 1645)
- November 4 – Guido Reni, Italian painter (d. 1642)
- November 26 – John Augustus, Count Palatine of Lützelstein, German count (d. 1611)
- December 4 – The Nun of Monza, Italian nun (d. 1650)
- December 18 – Michelagnolo Galilei, Italian lutenist and composer (d. 1631)
- date unknown
  - Jakob Böhme, German mystic (d. 1624)
  - David Calderwood, Scottish divine and historian (d. 1650)
  - Concino Concini, 3rd Prime Minister of France (d. 1617)
  - Anna Kostka, Polish noblewoman (d. 1635)
  - Lionel Cranfield, 1st Earl of Middlesex, successful London merchant (d. 1645)
  - William Parker, 4th Baron Monteagle (d. 1622)
  - Arbella Stuart, Duchess of Somerset (d. 1615)
  - Cyril Tourneur, English dramatist (d. 1626)
  - Rory O'Donnell, 1st Earl of Tyrconnell (d. 1608)
- probable
  - Vittoria Aleotti, Italian composer (d. c. 1620)
  - Giambattista Basile, Italian poet (d. 1632)
  - Edmund Bolton, English historian and poet (d. 1633)
  - Clemente Tabone, Maltese landowner and militia member (d. 1665)

== Deaths ==
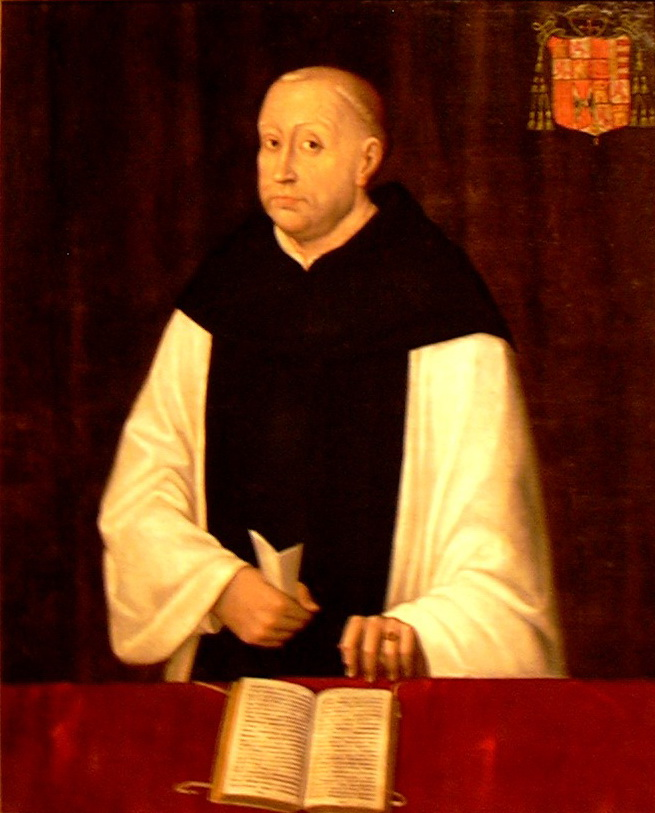
Hernando de Aragón

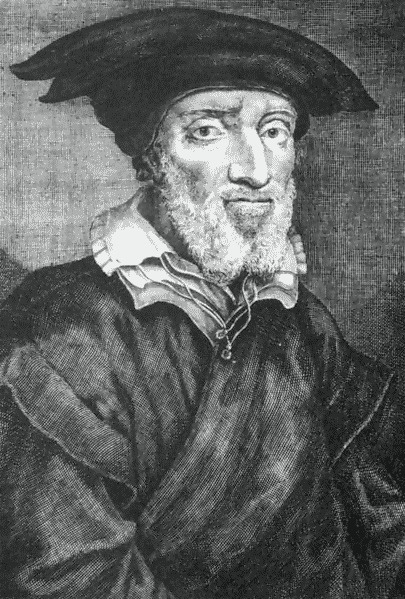
Matthias Flacius

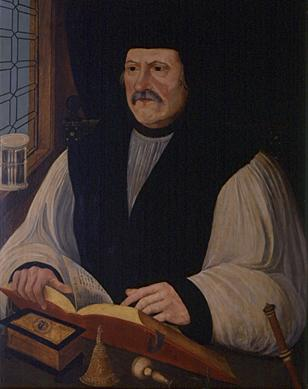
Reverend Matthew Parker

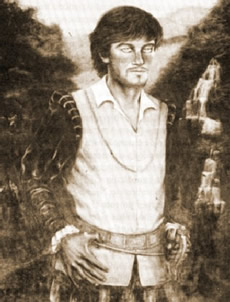
Francisco de Ibarra

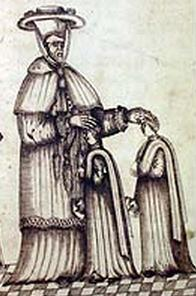
Gaspar Cervantes de Gaeta

- January 4 – Sidonie of Saxony, Duchess of Brunswick-Calenberg (b. 1518)
- January 14 – Barbara Uthmann, German businessperson (b. 1514)
- January 22 – James Hamilton, Duke of Châtellerault (b. 1516)
- January 29 – Hernando de Aragón, Spanish Roman Catholic archbishop (b. 1498)
- February 9 – Karl Friedrich of Jülich-Cleves-Berg, heir apparent of Jülich-Cleves-Berg (b. 1555)
- February 20 – Maria of Jever, last ruler of the Lordship of Jever (b. 1500)
- February 21 – Claude of Valois, Duchess consort of Lorraine and French princess (b. 1547)
- March 11 – Matthias Flacius, Croatian Protestant reformer (b. 1520)
- March 15 – Annibale Padovano, Italian composer and organist (b. 1527)
- March 17 – Georg Cracow, German lawyer and politician (b. 1525)
- March 24 – Yosef Karo, Spanish-born Jewish rabbi. Author of the book "Shulchan Aruch" (b. 1488)
- May 17 – Matthew Parker, English Roman Catholic archbishop (b. 1504)
- May 28 – Sophia Jagiellon, Duchess of Brunswick-Lüneburg (b. 1522)
- June 3 – Francisco de Ibarra, Spanish explorer and colonial governor in Mexico (b. c. 1539)
- June 7 – Sir George Heron, English politician
- June 28 – Yonekura Shigetsugu, Japanese samurai
- June 29
  - Baba Nobuharu, Japanese samurai
  - Hara Masatane, Japanese samurai (b. 1531)
  - Naito Masatoyo, Japanese samurai (b. 1522)
  - Sanada Nobutsuna, Japanese samurai (b. 1537)
  - Takeda Nobuzane, Japanese daimyō
  - Yamagata Masakage, Japanese samurai (b. 1524)
- July 14 – Richard Taverner, English Bible translator (b. 1505)
- July 29 – Jon Simonssøn, Norwegian humanist (b. 1512)
- August 2 – Christopher II, Margrave of Baden-Rodemachern (b. 1537)
- September 17 – Heinrich Bullinger, Swiss religious reformer (b. 1504)
- September 24 – Anna of Oldenburg, Regent of East Frisia (b. 1501)
- October 17 – Gaspar Cervantes de Gaeta, Spanish Roman Catholic cardinal (b. 1511)
- October 20 – Kaspar Eberhard, German theologian (b. 1523)
- October 24 – Peder Oxe, Danish finance minister (b. 1520)
- November 2 – Sabina of Brandenburg-Ansbach, German princess (b. 1529)
- December 1 – Diego Andrada de Payva, Portuguese theologian (b. 1528)
- December 23 – Akiyama Nobutomo, Japanese retainer (b. 1531)
- December 31 – Pierino Belli, Italian soldier and jurist (b. 1502)
- date unknown
  - Constantio Varoli, Italian anatomist (b. 1543)
  - Isabel de Josa, Catalan writer (b. 1508)

== In fiction ==
- The conclusion of the events of the film Kagemusha by Akira Kurosawa takes place in this year.
