= 1502 =

1502 in various calendars
- Gregorian calendar: 1502; MDII
- Ab urbe condita: 2255
- Armenian calendar: 951; ԹՎ ՋԾԱ
- Assyrian calendar: 6252
- Balinese saka calendar: 1423–1424
- Bengali calendar: 908–909
- Berber calendar: 2452
- English Regnal year: 17 Hen. 7 – 18 Hen. 7
- Buddhist calendar: 2046
- Burmese calendar: 864
- Byzantine calendar: 7010–7011
- Chinese calendar: 辛酉年 (Metal Rooster); 4199 or 3992 — to — 壬戌年 (Water Dog); 4200 or 3993
- Coptic calendar: 1218–1219
- Discordian calendar: 2668
- Ethiopian calendar: 1494–1495
- Hebrew calendar: 5262–5263
- Hindu calendars
- Vikram Samvat: 1558–1559
- Shaka Samvat: 1423–1424
- Kali Yuga: 4602–4603
- Holocene calendar: 11502
- Igbo calendar: 502–503
- Iranian calendar: 880–881
- Islamic calendar: 907–908
- Japanese calendar: Bunki 2 (文亀２年)
- Javanese calendar: 1419–1420
- Julian calendar: 1502; MDII
- Korean calendar: 3835
- Minguo calendar: 410 before ROC 民前410年
- Nanakshahi calendar: 34
- Thai solar calendar: 2044–2045
- Tibetan calendar: ལྕགས་མོ་བྱ་ལོ་ (female Iron-Bird); 1628 or 1247 or 475 — to — ཆུ་ཕོ་ཁྱི་ལོ་ (male Water-Dog); 1629 or 1248 or 476

Year 1502 (MDII) was a common year starting on Saturday of the Julian calendar.

== Events ==
=== January–March ===
- January 1 – Portuguese explorers, led by Gonçalo Coelho, sail into Guanabara Bay, Brazil, mistaking it for the mouth of a river, which they name Rio de Janeiro.
- January 24 – Commissioners from Scotland and England meet at Richmond Palace in London to finalize an agreement on the marriage between Scotland's King James IV to the daughter of England's King Henry VII, the princess Margaret Tudor, with a dowry of 35,000 Scottish Punnds and an agreement for a "treaty of perpetual peace". The marriage will be completed by proxy on January 25, 1503.
- February 12 – Isabella I issues an edict outlawing Islam in the Crown of Castile, forcing virtually all her Muslim subjects to convert to Christianity.
- February 13 – The new Viceroy of the New World, Nicolás de Ovando, departs Spain with a fleet of 30 ships and orders to replace Viceroy Francisco de Bobadilla at Santo Domingo on the island of Hispaniola, and arrives in April.
- March 14 – Christopher Columbus begins preparation for his fourth and final voyage, with a goal of finding a westward passage in the New World to link the Atlantic Ocean to the Indian Ocean.
- March 26 – The first recorded earthquake in what is now Croatia strikes at Medvednica with a Mercalli scale intensity estimated at VIII. (2000).

=== April–June ===
- April 2 – Arthur, Prince of Wales, the 15-year-old Duke of Cornwall and Earl of Chester, heir to the English throne as eldest son of King Henry VII, dies after a long illness less than five months after marrying Catherine of Aragon. Arthur's 10-year-old brother, Henry, Duke of York, becomes the new heir to the throne and will later succeed his father as King Henry VIII.
- April 11 – Dmitry Ivanovich Vnuk, who had been the teenage co-ruler of the Grand Duchy of Moscow since 1498 with his grandfather Ivan III, is arrested along with his mother, Elena of Moldavia on suspicion of conspiracy. Ivan designates his son (and Dmitry's uncle) Vasili Ivanovich as the new heir to the throne of Moscow.
- April 14 – The formal coronation of Ivan the Great as Grand Prince of Moscow (encompassing most of the Russian people's territory) to reflect that he is the nation's sole ruler. Ivan had been co-ruler of Moscow from 1449 to 1462, ruler from 1462 to 1471 and 1490 to 1498, and co-ruler with his eldest son (Ivan the Young, 1471-1490) and his grandson, Dmitry Ivanovich from 1498 onward.
- May 3 – Portuguese navigator João da Nova discovers the uninhabited island of Saint Helena.
- May 9 – Christopher Columbus leaves Cadiz in Spain for his fourth and final trip to the New World, taking with him 147 men on his flagship, Capitana and the companion ships Gallega, Vizcaína, and Santiago de Palos. He explores Central America, and discovers the Isthmus of Panama and the land now occupied by Honduras, and Costa Rica, and possibly the island of St. Lucia as well
- May 26 – Columbus and his men complete the rescue of stranded Portuguese soldiers in Morocco, then depart Asilah for a crossing of the Atlantic in 20 days.
- June 15 – Columbus and his crew land on the island of Martinique and land at Le Carbet.
- June 29 – Columbus and his crew attempt to land at Santo Domingo in order to avoid being caught in a hurricane, despite being ordered not to return to Hispaniola. Nicolás de Ovando, the Spanish Viceroy, refuses to let Columbus sail into harbor and does not believe the warnings of the hurricane, which strikes two days later.

=== July–September ===
- July 1 – A powerful hurricane sweeps through the Caribbean Sea near Puerto Rico and the island of Hispaniola, two days after Christopher Columbus was denied permission to land at Santo Domingo. An estimated 500 people are killed when the winds wreck 20 of the 31 ships brought from Spain by the new Viceroy, Nicolás de Ovando, including Ovando's flagship, El Dorado. Former Viceroy Francisco de Bobadilla and administrator Francisco Roldán are among the people killed. A ship provided by Bobadilla for Columbus to transport the gold owed to him, the Aguja, is one of the 11 to survive the hurricane and accusations are made that Columbus magically invoked the storm as an act of vengeance.
- July 28 – At Augsburg, Maximilian I, Germany's King of the Romans signs a treaty with representatives of King Henry VII of England, agreeing not to provide assistance to English rebels.
- July 30 – The first encounter between Europeans and the Maya people of Central America takes place when the Columbus brothers anchor at Guanaja, one of the Bay Islands off of the coast of what is now the nation of Honduras. An unfortunate group of Mayan traders happens to arrive at Guanaja at the same time, and its cargo is looted by Bartolomeo Columbus and his crew.
- August 14 – Christopher Columbus and his crew land at Puerto Castilla in what is now the mainland of the nation of Honduras, becoming the first Europeans to visit.
- September 18 – Christopher Columbus lands at Central America at what is now Costa Rica.
- September 29 – Anne of Foix-Candale is proclaimed Queen of Hungary upon her marriage to Vladislaus II, King of Hungary and Bohemia, at a ceremony in Székesfehérvár.

=== October–December ===
- October 1 – An annular solar eclipse occurs.
- October 16 – Columbus and his crew arrive at Almirante Bay in Panama.
- November 7 – Ismail I founds the Safavid dynasty and proclaims himself the Shah of Iran after defeating tribes of the Aq Qoyunlu confederation.
- November 19 – The "Cantino planisphere", a precise copy for an Italian spy of Portugal's secret Padrão Real map of the New World, is acquired by Alberto Cantino, agent for Ercole I d'Este, Duke of Ferrara, at a cost of 12 golden ducats.
- December 26 – Cesare Borgia kills Ramiro d'Orco; this incident is referenced in Machiavelli's The Prince
- December 31 – Cesare Borgia (son of Pope Alexander VI) occupies Urbino, where he imprisons two potentially treacherous allies, Vitellozzo and Oliveretto; he executes them the next morning.

=== Date unknown ===
- The first African slaves brought to the New World arrive at the island of Hispaniola (modern-day Haiti and Dominican Republic).
- Bristol merchants return from Newfoundland (first so named this year from a letter) to England, carrying three native people and cod from the Grand Banks.
- Moctezuma II is elected emperor of the Aztecs, following the death of Ahuitzotl.
- Meñli I Giray defeats the Golden Horde and sacks their capital, Sarai.
- Wittenberg University is founded.
- In Germany, Peter Henlein of Nuremberg uses iron parts and coiled springs to build a portable timepiece.
- In Italy, Asher Lämmlein declares that the Jewish Messiah will arrive in the next 6 months, resulting in the year of penance.
- The King's School, Macclesfield, England, is founded by Sir John Percyvale.
- Heinrich Cornelius Agrippa receives the degree of magister artium from the University of Cologne.
- Wilhelm Bombast moves to Villach with his son, Paracelsus.

== Births ==
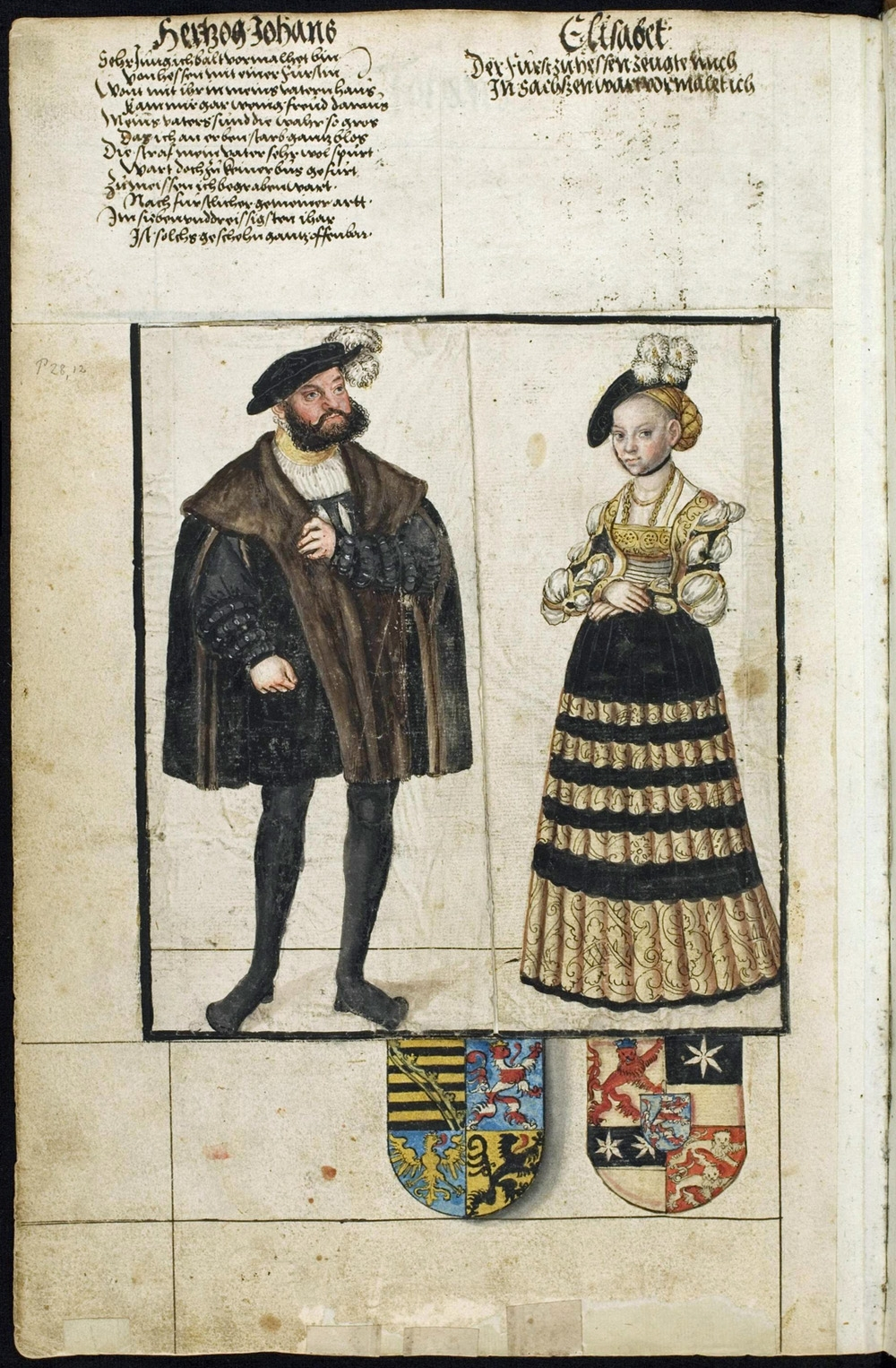
Elisabeth of Hesse, Hereditary Princess of Saxony

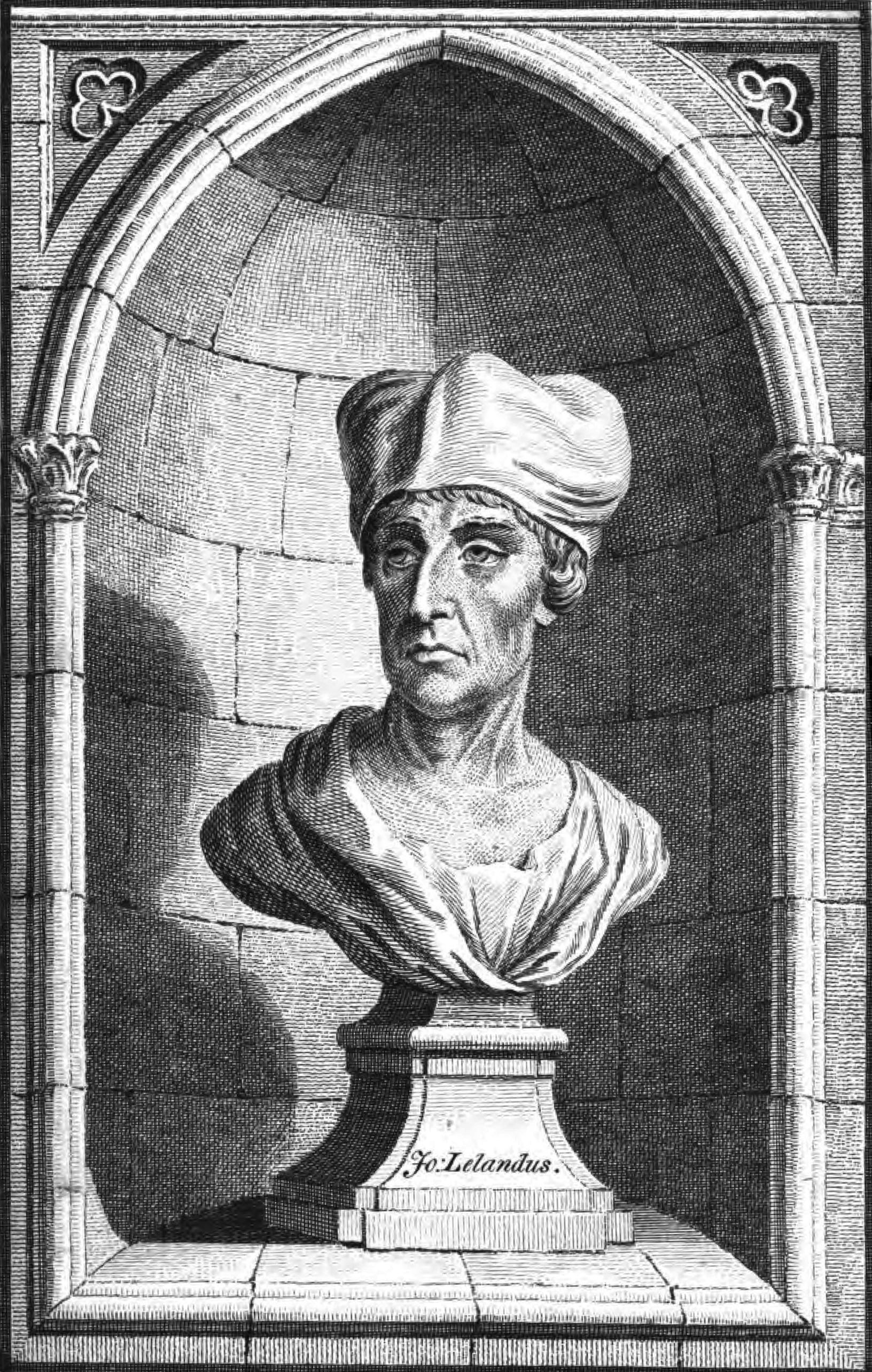
John Leland

- January 3 – Yi Hwang, Korean Neo-Confucian scholar (d.1571)
- January 7 (Julian) (January 17 Gregorian)– Pope Gregory XIII, born Ugo Boncompagni, Bolognese-born pontiff (d. 1585)
- January 20 – Sebastian de Aparicio, Spanish colonial industrialist and saint in Mexico (d. 1600)
- February 2 – Damião de Góis, Portuguese philosopher (d. 1574)
- March 4 – Elisabeth of Hesse, Hereditary Princess of Saxony (d. 1557)
- March 18 – Philibert of Chalon, French nobleman (d. 1530)
- March 20 – Pierino Belli, Italian soldier and jurist (d. 1575)
- April 2 – Susanna of Bavaria, German noble of the House of Wittelsbach (d. 1543)
- April 10 – Otto Henry, Count Palatine of Neuburg (1505–1559) and Elector Palatine (1556–1559) (d. 1559)
- April 25 – Georg Major, German Lutheran theologian (d. 1574)
- June 2 – Guillaume Bigot, French writer (d. 1550)
- June 6 – King John III of Portugal (d. 1557)
- July 26 – Christian Egenolff, German printer (d. 1555)
- July 27 – Francesco Corteccia, Italian composer (d. 1571)
- August 14 – Pieter Coecke van Aelst, Flemish painter (d. 1550)
- September 14 – Louis II, Count Palatine of Zweibrücken, Duke of Zweibrücken from 1514 to 1532 (d. 1532)
- December 6 – Anna of Brunswick-Lüneburg, Duchess consort of Pomerania (d. 1568)
- December 13 – George III, Landgrave of Leuchtenberg (d. 1555)
- date unknown
  - Takeno Jōō, Japanese Sengoku period master of the tea ceremony and merchant (d. 1555)
  - Miguel López de Legazpi, Spanish conquistador (d. 1572)
  - Pedro Nunes, Portuguese mathematician (d. 1578)
  - Francesco Spiera, Italian Protestant jurist (d. 1543)
  - Anthony Maria Zaccaria, Cremonese founder of the Barnabite Order and saint (d. 1539)
- probable
  - Elizabeth Blount, English courtier, mistress of King Henry VIII (d. 1540)
  - Cuauhtémoc, last Aztec ruler (Tlatoani) of Tenochtitlán and the last "Aztec Emperor" (d. 1525)
  - Blaise de Lasseran-Massencôme, seigneur de Montluc, marshal of France (approximate date; d. 1577)
  - Hurrem Sultan, Ruthenian-born Haseki sultan of the Ottoman Empire (d. 1558)
  - Henry Percy, 6th Earl of Northumberland, English courtier (d. 1537)

== Deaths ==
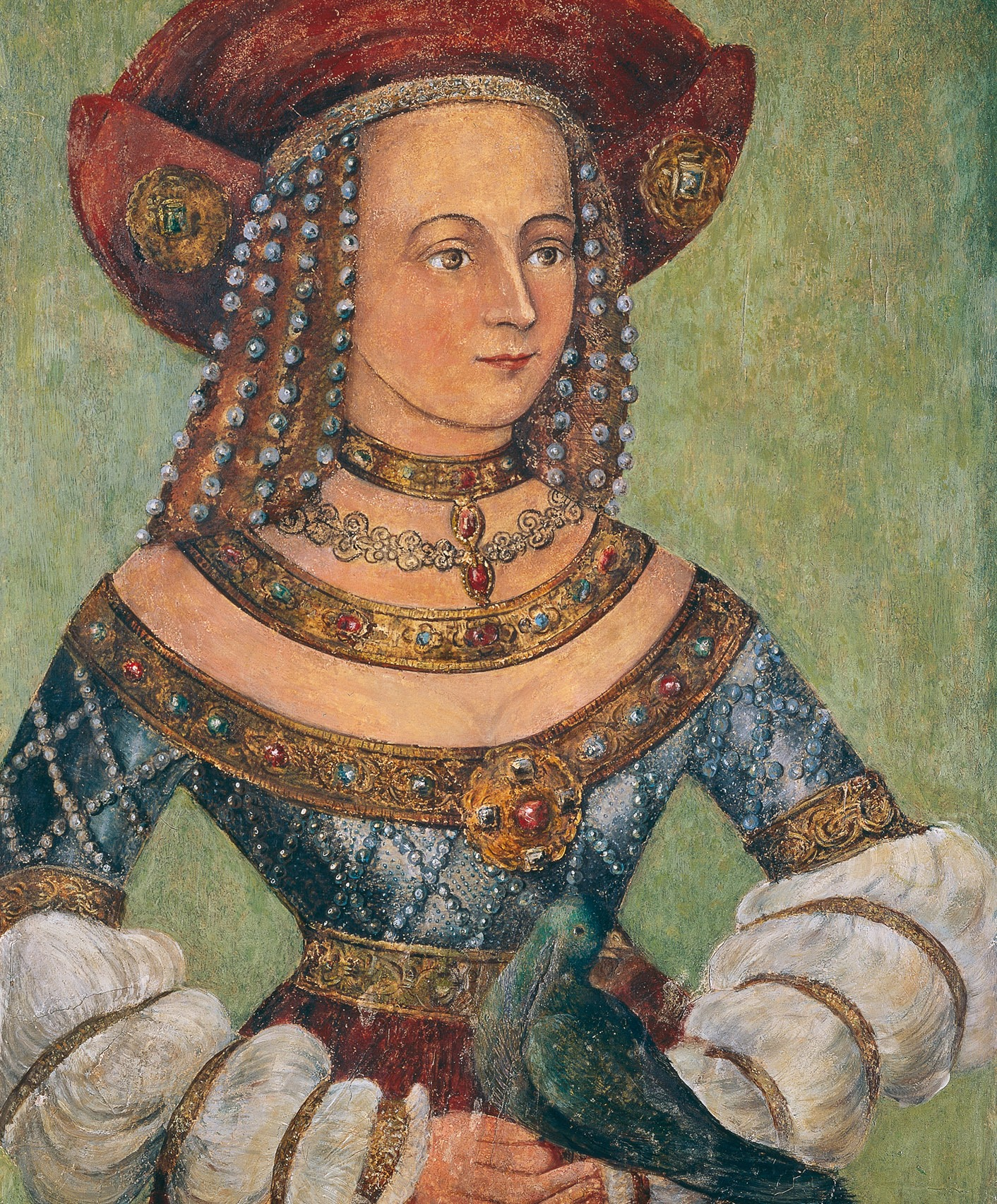
Hedwig Jagiellon, Duchess of Bavaria

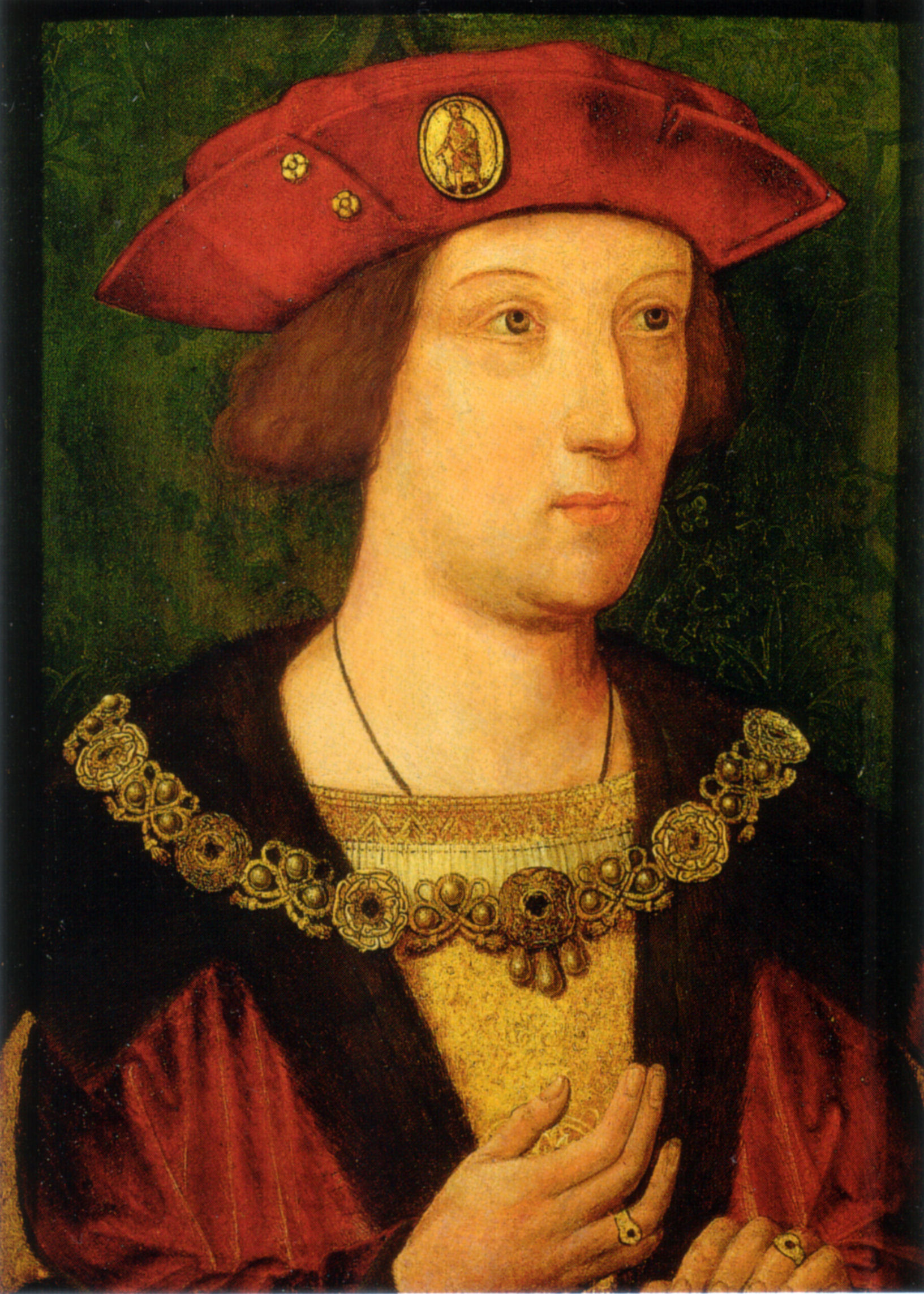
Arthur, Prince of Wales

=== January–June ===
- February 18 – Hedwig Jagiellon, Duchess of Bavaria (b. 1457)
- March – Francesco Laurana, Dalmatian-born sculptor (b. c. 1430)
- March 2 – Jan I Carondelet, Burgundian jurist and politician (b. 1428)
- April 2 – Arthur, Prince of Wales, English prince, eldest son of Henry VII of England (b. 1486)
- April 15 – John IV of Chalon-Arlay, Prince of Orange (1475–1502) (b. 1443)
- April 20 – Mary of Looz-Heinsberg, Dutch noble (b. 1424)
- May 4 – Berthold II of Landsberg, Bishop of Verden (1470–1502) and Hildesheim (1481–1502) (b. 1464)
- May 6 – James Tyrrell, English knight, alleged murderer of the princes in the Tower (executed) (b. c. 1450)
- June 9 – Astorre III Manfredi, Italian noble (b. 1485)

=== July–December ===
- July 15 – Luka Radovanović, Catholic priest (b. 1425)
- August 18 – Knut Alvsson, Norwegian nobleman and politician (b. 1455)
- August 31 – Thomas Wode, Lord Chief Justice of the Common Pleas
- September 1 – Sōgi, Japanese Buddhist priest and poet (b. 1421)
- October 14 – Diego Hurtado de Mendoza y Quiñones, Spanish noble (b. 1444)
- November 10 – George I of Münsterberg, Imperial Prince, Duke of Münsterberg and Oels, Graf von Glatz (b. 1470)
- November 13 – Annio da Viterbo, Italian Dominican friar and scholar (b. 1432)
- December 31
  - Oliverotto Euffreducci, Italian politician (b. 1475)
  - Vitellozzo Vitelli, Italian condottiero (b. c. 1458)
- date unknown
  - Ahuitzotl, Aztec ruler of Tenochtitlan
  - Giustina Rocca, Italian Renaissance lawyer, judge and diplomat
  - Octavien de Saint-Gelais, French churchman, poet and translator (b. 1468)
  - Gwerful Mechain, Welsh erotic poet (b. c. 1460?)
