= 1512 =

1512 in various calendars
Gregorian calendar	1512; MDXII
Ab urbe condita	2265
Armenian calendar	961; ԹՎ ՋԿԱ
Assyrian calendar	6262
Balinese saka calendar	1433–1434
Bengali calendar	918–919
Berber calendar	2462
English Regnal year	3 Hen. 8 – 4 Hen. 8
Buddhist calendar	2056
Burmese calendar	874
Byzantine calendar	7020–7021
Chinese calendar	辛未年 (Metal Goat); 4209 or 4002 — to — 壬申年 (Water Monkey); 4210 or 4003
Coptic calendar	1228–1229
Discordian calendar	2678
Ethiopian calendar	1504–1505
Hebrew calendar	5272–5273
- Hindu calendars
Vikram Samvat	1568–1569
Shaka Samvat	1433–1434
Kali Yuga	4612–4613
Holocene calendar	11512
Igbo calendar	512–513
Iranian calendar	890–891
Islamic calendar	917–918
Japanese calendar	Eishō 9 (永正９年)
Javanese calendar	1429–1430
Julian calendar	1512; MDXII
Korean calendar	3845
Minguo calendar	400 before ROC 民前400年
Nanakshahi calendar	44
Thai solar calendar	2054–2055
Tibetan calendar	ལྕགས་མོ་ལུག་ལོ་ (female Iron-Sheep); 1638 or 1257 or 485 — to — ཆུ་ཕོ་སྤྲེ་ལོ་ (male Water-Monkey); 1639 or 1258 or 486

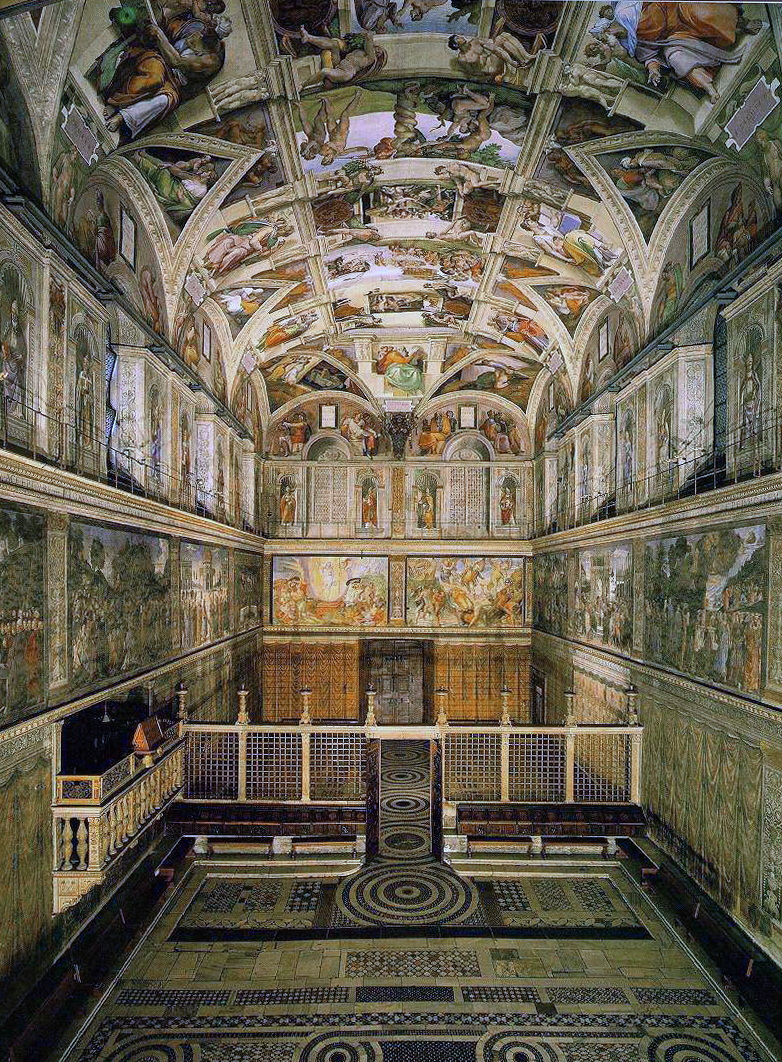
November 1: Michelangelo's painting on the ceiling of the Sistine Chapel is displayed to the public for the first time.

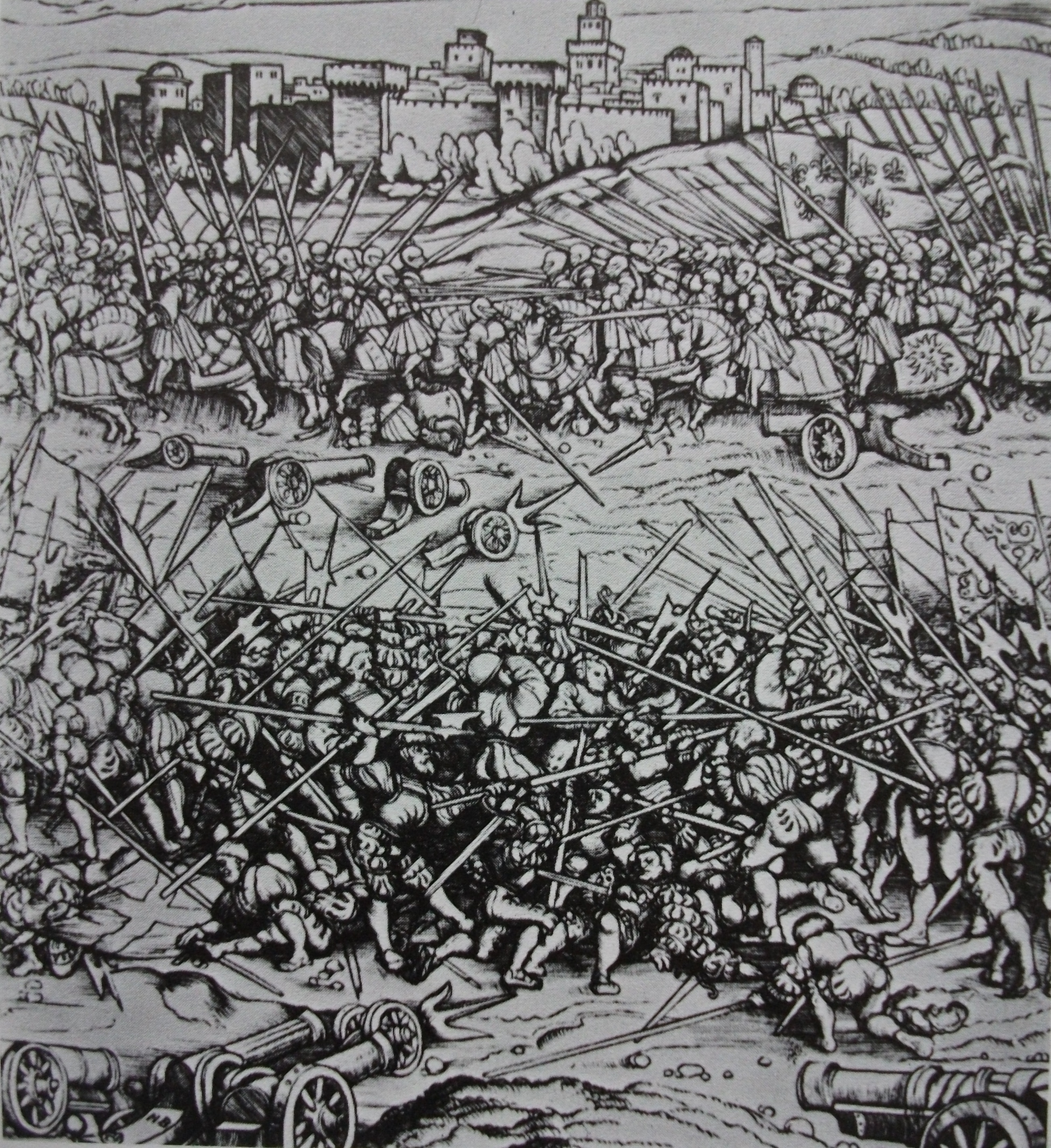
April 11: Thousands are killed in the Battle of Ravenna

Year 1512 (MDXII) was a leap year starting on Thursday of the Julian calendar.

== Events ==
=== January–March ===
- January 2 – Svante Nilsson, regent of Sweden since 1504, dies at the age of 51. Eric Trolle is subsequently elected as the new Regent, but will be ousted after only six months.
- January 23 – Neagoe Basarab becomes the new Prince of Wallachia at the capital, Târgoviște, after Prince Prince Vlad V is captured at battle in Bucharest and then decapitated.
- February 18 – War of the League of Cambrai: The French carry out the Sack of Brescia.
- March 12 – Pope Julius II issues the papal bull Dilecte fili, declaring King Louis XII deposed and directing that the French throne be given to King Henry VIII of England.
- March 23 – Donyo Dorje, ruler of the Kingdom of Ü-Tsang and most of Tibet, dies after a reign of more than 30 years and is succeeded by his brother, Ngawang Namgyal.

=== April–June ===
- April 6 – A truce was concluded in Rome, between the emperor Maximilian I and the Republic of Venice. It was ratified on 20 May by the emperor, thus ending imperial participation in the League of Cambrai.
- April 11 – War of the League of Cambrai – Battle of Ravenna: French troops under Gaston of Foix, Duke of Nemours, assisted by the Duchy of Ferrara, defeat the Spanish and Papal States troops led by Ramón de Cardona. Gaston is killed in the pursuit as the Spanish retreat, and at least 3,000 of his troops are killed. More than 9,000 Spanish and Papal troops are killed, and 17,000 civilians in and around the city of Ravenna are massacred.
- May 3 – The Fifth Council of the Lateran begins.
- May 12 – Thomas Howard, 2nd Duke of Norfolk, leads an English expedition into France and burns the port city of Brest.
- May 26 – Selim I succeeds Bayezid II, as Sultan of the Ottoman Empire.
- June 15 – Al-Ashraf Qansuh al-Ghuri, ruler of the Mamluk Sultanate that controls Egypt and what is now Egypt, Israel, Lebanon and parts of Syria, receives an envoy from King George II of Kakheti (now located in the Republic of Georgia) and decides to reopen the Church of the Holy Sepulchre in Jerusalem.
- June 16 – Massimiliano Sforza is installed as the new Duke of Milan by the Holy League, to force out King Louis XII of France.
- June 24 – Captain-Major Simão de Miranda de Azevedo took office as the new Portuguese Governor of Mozambique after being replaced by King Manuel I to replace António de Saldanha.
- June 29 – Giano II di Campofregoso was elected as the Doge of the Republic of Genoa in Italy after the withdrawal of French occupation troops, filling a vacancy that had existed since 1507.

=== July–September ===
- July 10 – King Ferdinand II of Aragon sends Don Fadrique de Toledo, to complete the Spanish conquest of Iberian Navarre.
- July 12 – The Treaty of Blois is signed in France between representatives of the Spanish Kingdom of Navarre and of the Kingdom of France guaranteeing French intervention to keep Navarre neutral and to prevent an attack by the "Holy League" alliance of Pope Julius II and Spain's King Ferdinand II of Aragon and Castile.
- July 23 – Sten Sture the Younger is elected new Regent of Sweden, replacing Eric Trolle.
- August 10 – War of the League of Cambrai – Battle of Saint-Mathieu: The English navy defeats the French-Breton fleet. Both navies use ships firing cannons through ports, and each loses its principal ship — Regent and Marie-la-Cordelière — through a large explosion aboard the latter.
- September 1 – After being dispatched by Pope Julius II with command of a Spanish Army, General Giovanni di Lorenzo de' Medici recaptures the city of Florence (Firenze), capital of the Florentine Republic in Italy and ousts Piero Soderini as the ruling Gonfaloniere. The success at Florence spares the city of Rome from a French invasion. Within a year, Medici becomes leader of the Roman Catholic Church and the Papal States as Pope Leo X.
- September 10 – Portuguese Admiral Afonso de Albuquerque departs from the Indian city of Cochin with 14 ships and 1,700 troops to retake the fortress of Goa, capital of Portuguese India, from Bijapur's General Rasul Khan. A day before a planned Portuguese attack on Bihar's army, Rasul Khan and his occupying forces depart from Goa.

=== October–December ===
- October 19 – Martin Luther becomes a doctor of theology (Doctor in Biblia).
- October 21 – Martin Luther joins the theological faculty of the University of Wittenberg.
- November 1 – The ceiling of the Sistine Chapel, painted by Michelangelo, is exhibited to the public for the first time.
- November 10 – Pope Julius II proposes the conclusion of a comprehensive peace treaty between the emperor and the Venetians, that would resolve various political conflicts by favoring Maximilian's interests and suppressing the French influence in Italy.
- December 23 – Finding the Pope's peace proposals too favorable towards the emperor, Venetian government decides to initiate peace negotiations with the king of France.
- December 27 – The Spanish Crown issues the Laws of Burgos, governing the conduct of settlers with regard to native Indians in the New World.

=== Date unknown ===
- António de Abreu discovers Timor Island, and reaches the Banda Islands, Ambon Island and Seram.
- Francisco Serrão reaches the Moluccas.
- Francisco Serrao and other shipwreck sailors with permission from the Ternate Sultanate build Fort Tolukko. It is one of the earliest, if not the first European style fortress in southeast Asia.
- Juan Ponce de León discovers the Turks and Caicos Islands.
- Pedro Mascarenhas discovers Diego Garcia, and reaches Mauritius in the Mascarene Islands.
- Moldavia becomes a vassal of the Ottoman Empire, on the same conditions as Wallachia: the voivode will be designated by the Turks, but will be Eastern Orthodox Christians. Also, the Turks are not allowed to build mosques, to be buried, to own land or to settle in the country.
- The Florentine Republic begins to be dismantled, and the Medici Family comes back into power.
- The word masque is first used to denote a poetic drama.
- Nicolaus Copernicus begins to write Commentariolus, an abstract of what will eventually become De revolutionibus orbium coelestium; he sends it to other scientists interested in the matter by 1514.

== Births ==
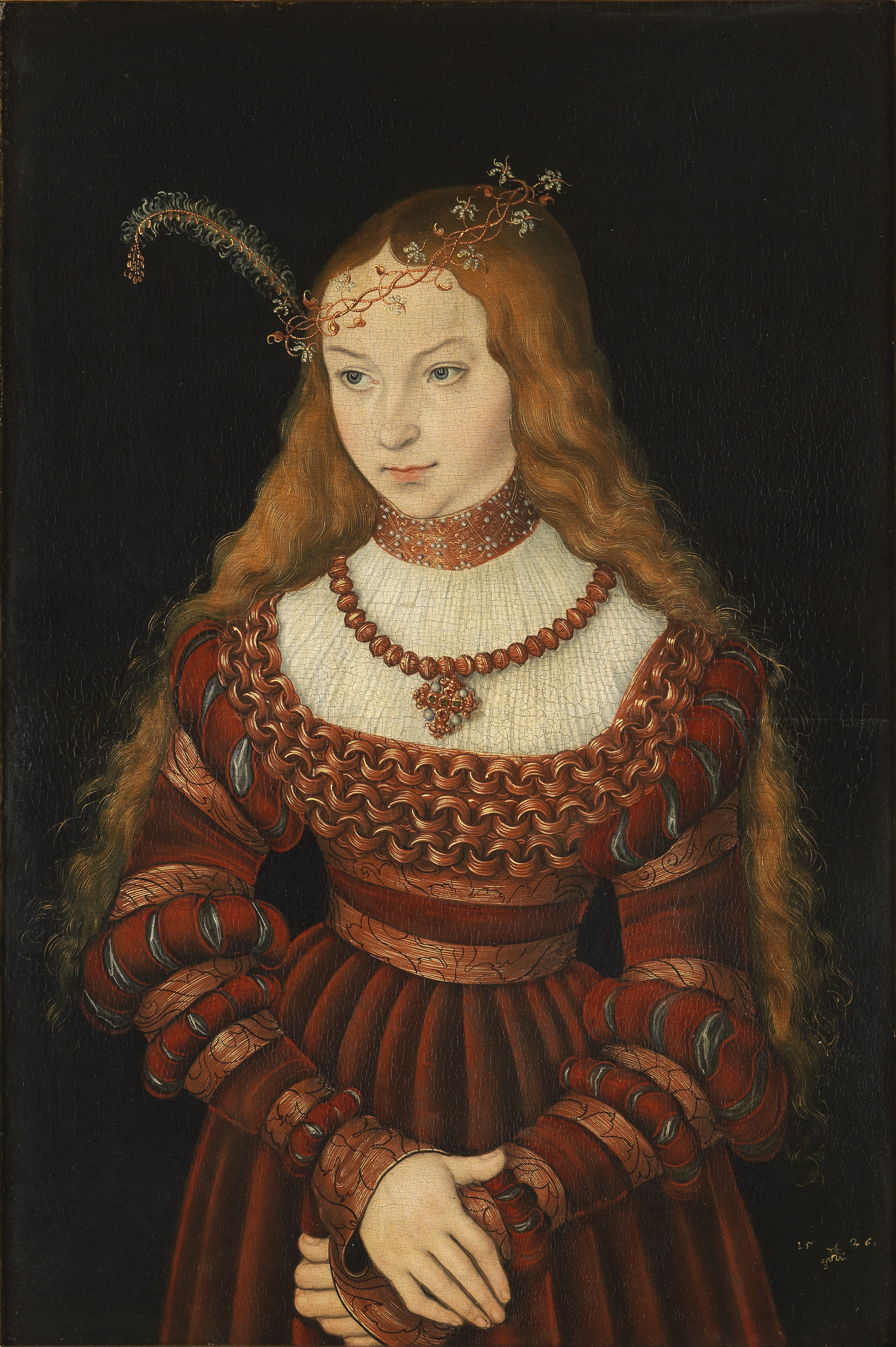
Sibylle of Cleves

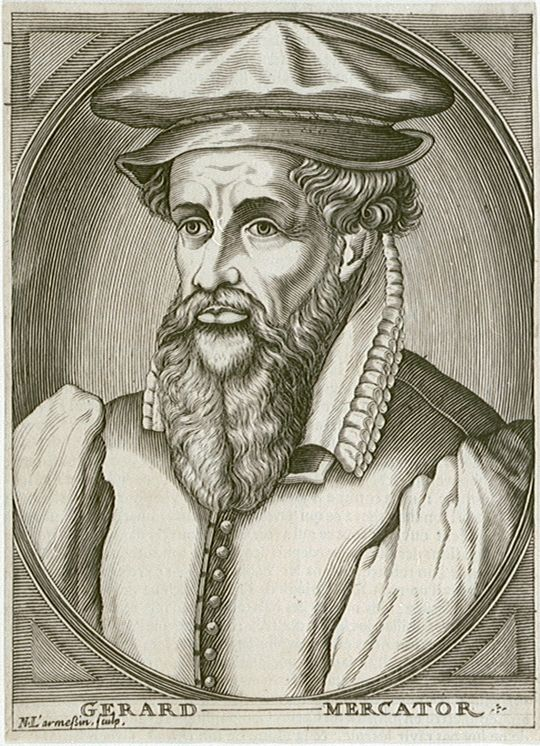
Gerardus Mercator

- January 13 – Gaspar de Quiroga y Vela, General Inquisitor of Spain (d. 1594)
- January 17 – Sibylle of Cleves, electress consort of Saxony (d. 1554)
- January 31 – Henry, King of Portugal and Cardinal (d. 1580)
- February 3 – John Hamilton, archbishop of St Andrews (d. 1571)
- February 22 – Pedro Agustín, Spanish Catholic bishop (d. 1572)
- March 5 – Gerardus Mercator, Flemish cartographer (d. 1594)
- April 10 – James V, King of Scots (d. 1542)
- April 23 – Henry FitzAlan, 19th Earl of Arundel, Chancellor of the University of Oxford (d. 1580)
- April 30 – George II, Duke of Münsterberg-Oels, Count of Glatz (d. 1553)
- July 5 – Cristoforo Madruzzo, Italian Catholic cardinal (d. 1578)
- July 25 – Diego de Covarrubias y Leyva, Spanish jurist, Roman Catholic prelate, Archbishop of Cuenca (d. 1577)
- August ? – Catherine Parr, English queen consort (d. 1548)
- August 27 – Friedrich Staphylus, German theologian (d. 1564)
- November 4 – Hu Zongxian, Chinese general (d. 1565)
- November 9 – Jon Simonssøn, Norwegian humanist (d. 1575)
- November 11 – Marcin Kromer, Prince-Bishop of Warmia (d. 1589)
- December 21 – Boniface IV, Marquess of Montferrat, Italian nobleman (d. 1530)
- date unknown
  - Robert Recorde, Welsh physician and mathematician (d. 1558)
  - Gissur Einarsson, first Lutheran bishop in Iceland (d. 1548)

== Deaths ==
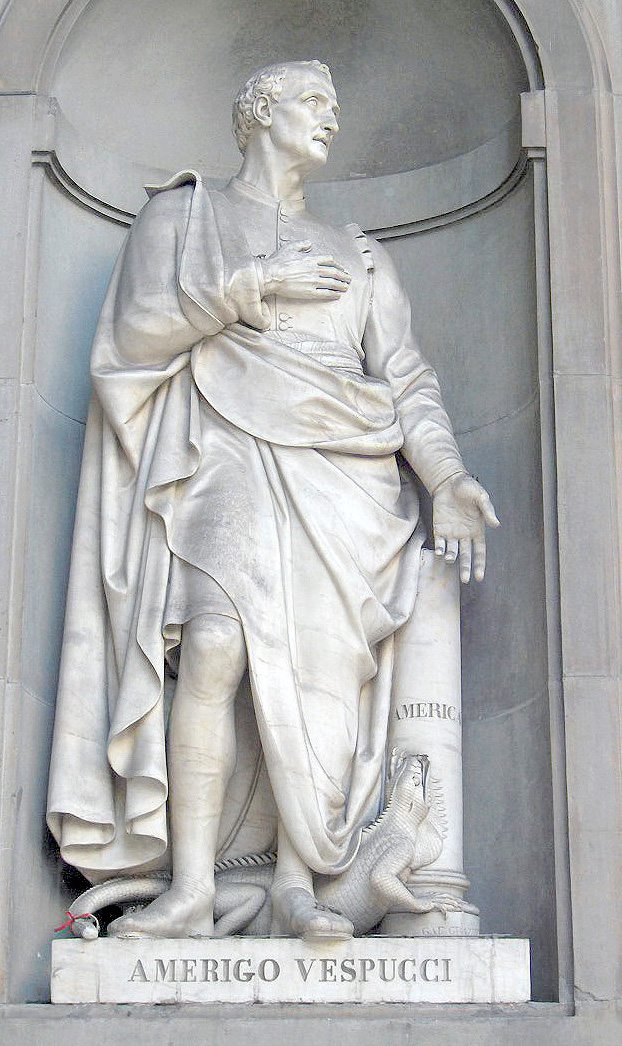
Amerigo Vespucci

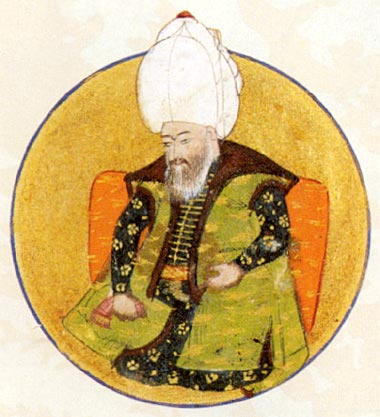
Sultan Bayezid II

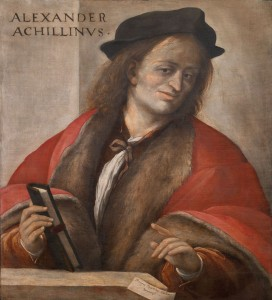
Alessandro Achillini

- January 2 – Svante Nilsson, regent of Sweden since 1504 (b. 1460)
- January 30 – Reinhard IV, Count of Hanau-Münzenberg (1500–1512) (b. 1473)
- February 2 – Hatuey, Puerto Rican Taíno chief
- February 22 – Amerigo Vespucci, Italian merchant and cartographer, after whom the Americas are named (b. 1451)
- March 29 – Lucas Watzenrode, Prince-Bishop of Warmia (b. 1447)
- April 11
  - Gaston de Foix, French military commander (b. 1489)
  - Asakura Sadakage, 9th head of the Asakura clan (b. 1473)
- May 21 – Pandolfo Petrucci, ruler of Siena (b. 1452)
- May 26 – Bayezid II, Ottoman Sultan (b. 1447)
- June 20 – Goto Yujo, Japanese swordsman and artisan (b. 1440)
- August 2 – Alessandro Achillini, Italian philosopher (b. 1463)
- August 15 – Imperia Cognati, Italian courtesan (b. 1486)
- September 15 – John Stewart, 1st Earl of Atholl, Scottish peer (b. 1440)
- September 29 – Johannes Engel, German doctor, astronomer and astrologer (b. 1453)
- October 5 – Sophia Jagiellon, Margravine of Brandenburg-Ansbach, Polish princess (b. 1464)
- October 31 – Anna of Saxony, Electress of Brandenburg (b. 1437)
