= Suguri =

Suguri (written: 村主) is a Japanese surname. Notable people with the surname include:

- Fumie Suguri (村主 章枝, born 1980), Japanese figure skater
- Hiromasa Suguri (村主 博正, born 1976), Japanese footballer

== See also ==
- Suguru
