= Venceslaus Agrippa Lituanus =

Lithuanian writer (c. 1525 – c. 1597)

Great Scribe of Lithuania
- Reign: 1575-1585
- Predecessor: Ławryn Woyna
- Successor: Emmanuel Brzostowski

Castellan of Minsk
- Reign: 1586–1597
- Predecessor: Michał Haraburda
- Successor: Marcin Strawiński

Castellan of Smolensk
- Reign: 1590–1597
- Predecessor: Ostafi Wasylewicz Tyszkiewicz
- Successor: Wacław Szemiot

Marshal of the Sejm
- Reign: 22 February 1574 – 02 April 1574
- Predecessor: Jan Firlej
- Successor: Stanisław Szafraniec
- Born: c. 1525
- Died: c. 1597
- Spouses: Magdalena Pelgrimovskaya, Regina Dorogastaiskovna
- House: Agryppa
- Father: Michalo Lituanus
- Mother: Kotryna Stanislovaitė
- Religion: Lutheran

Venceslaus Agrippa Lituanus (Lithuanian: Venclovas Venclovaitis Agripa, Polish: Wacław Wencławowicz Agryppa; c. 1525 – c. 1597) was a Lithuanian writer and diplomat from the Grand Duchy of Lithuania. Possibly a son of Michalo Lituanus, throughout his life he held various offices such as the Great Scribe of Lithuania (1575–1585) and castellan of Minsk (1586–1597) and Smolensk (1590–1597). A Lutheran who openly raised confessional issues in his stories, Agrippa is considered one of the first writers of Lithuanian fiction. Besides being a member of both the Reformation and the Renaissance humanism movements, Agrippa also claimed that ancient Lithuanians spoke Latin because many Lithuanian words retained some elements of the language.

== Biography ==
Agrippa's exact date and place of birth is unknown. Historian Edmundas Antanas Rimša claims that his father was Venclovas Mikalojaitis from Maišiagala, also known as Michalo Lituanus. Agrippa's mother Kotryna Stanislovaitė had an estate in Jašiūnai, which her son inherited in 1554. Venclovas Mikalojaitis's second marriage with Darata Bilevičiūtė produced Agrippa's two other brothers, Venclovas (a small landowner who possibly converted from Evangelism to Catholicism) and Jonas.

From 1545 to 1552 Agrippa studied at the Protestant Jagiellonian University, Martin Luther University Halle-Wittenberg and Leipzig University, where he maintained contact with Lutheran publicists. In 1553 he wrote Oratio funebris de … principis … Iohannis Radzivili Oliciae et Nesvisii ducis, vita et more (Mourning speech about the life and death of the most illustrious nobleman and sir Jonas Radvila, Duke of Olyka and Nesvyžius). The work is considered Agrippa's most important as it symbolizes an "ideal person" of his time – the patriotic, God-fearing, educated, moral, artistic and scientific nobleman, in this case, a member of the Radziwiłł family (which he was a supporter of). The speech is considered the first work of Lithuanian fiction, and draws parallels to Mikalojus Daukša's Postilė. Agrippa also translated Johann Brenz's Postille.

In 1563 he was secretary to Sigismund Augustus. From 1556 Agrippa acted as the Lithuanian Field Scribe in Livonia. In 1572 Agrippa was inspector of royal estates in Livonia. From 22 February to 2 April 1574 Agrippa was Marshal of the Sejm in Kraków. In 1575 Agrippa became the Great Scribe of Lithuania. He also supported the election of Holy Roman Emperor Maximillian II as King of Poland and Grand Duke of Lithuania. From 1576 Agrippa was a secretary in the chancellery of Stephen Bathory. Agrippa took part in Bathory's various campaigns in the Livonian War, acting mainly as an envoy. He also took part in the creation of the Third Statute of Lithuania in 1588. Agrippa was the castellan of Minsk from 1586 to 1597 and castellan of Smolensk from 1590 to 1597.

== Family ==
Agrippa, like his father, was married twice. His first wife was Magdalena Pelgrimovskaya, who was buried in a Lutheran cathedral founded by her husband. Agrippa's stepson Eliasz Pielgrzymowski, also a future writer, received his father's will of German and Latin library books. Agrippa's second wife was Regina Dorogastaiskovna, daughter of the Voivode of Polotsk Mikołaj Dorohostajski. After Agrippa died, Regina married Mikołaj Sapieha.
