= Suguru =

- Gender: Male

Origin
- Origin: Japanese
- Meaning: Different meanings depending on the kanji used

Suguru (written: 卓, 優, 傑 or 優瑠) is a masculine Japanese given name. Notable people with the name include:

- Suguru Asanuma (浅沼 優瑠; born 1992), Japanese footballer
- Suguru Awaji (淡路 卓; born 1989), Japanese fencer
- Suguru Egawa (江川 卓; born 1955), Japanese baseball player and analyst
- Suguru Fukuda (福田 俊; born 1996), Japanese professional baseball pitcher
- Suguru Goto (後藤 英; born 1966), Japanese composer
- Suguru Hashimoto (橋本 卓; born 1982), Japanese footballer
- Suguru Hino (日野 優; born 1982), Japanese footballer
- Suguru Ino (井野 卓; born 1983), Japanese former professional baseball catcher
- Suguru Ito (伊藤 卓; born 1975), Japanese footballer
- Suguru Iwazaki (岩崎 優; born 1991), Japanese baseball player
- Suguru Kiyokawa (清川 卓; born 1978), Japanese bobsledder
- Suguru Muranaka (村中 優; born 1985), Japanese professional boxer
- Suguru Osako (大迫 傑; born 1991), Japanese long-distance runner
- Suguru Shigeno, Japanese mixed martial artist

== Fictional characters ==
- Suguru Daishō (大将 優), a character from the Haikyu!! series with the position of captain and outside hitter from Nohebi Academy
- Suguru Geto, an antagonist from the anime and manga series Jujutsu Kaisen
- Suguru Kamoshida, an antagonist in the game Persona 5
- Suguru Kinniku (キン肉 すぐる), protagonist of the manga series Kinnikuman
- Suguru Niragi, a (sort of) antagonist from the manga and series ‘’Alice In Borderland’’
