= Jin Goto =

Japanese artist

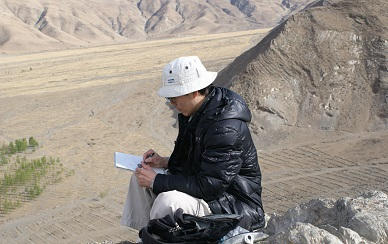
- Jin Goto in Tibet in 2012
- Born: 1968 (age 57–58); Hyōgo Prefecture, Japan
- Known for: Nihonga painting, Picture book

Jin Goto (後藤 仁, Gotō Jin; born 1968 in Hyōgo Prefecture) is a Japanese nihonga and picture book painter.

== Biography ==
He was born in Hyogo. His uncle is an artisan of Karakuri ningyō. In 1986, he appeared in the Exhibition of students at the National Gallery of Victoria in Australia. In 1988, he graduated from The Osaka City Kogei High School (Fine Arts course), and studied painting with Takashi Murakami for two years. From 1995, he restored the Japanese gold leather papers (金唐革紙 Kinkarakawashi, a kind of high-class handmade wallpaper) at Irifuneyama Memorial Hall in Kure, Ijokaku in Kobe, and Kyu-Iwasaki-tei Gardens in Tokyo (Nationally designated Important Cultural Properties of Japan). In 1996, he graduated from The Tokyo National University of Fine Arts and Music, and became a student of Sumio Goto. From 1996 to 2010 once a year, he showed work in the Exhibition of Nihonga by Syonokai in the Ginza Matsuzakaya department store. In 2007, his previous work was exhibited at the British Museum and Victoria and Albert Museum in London.

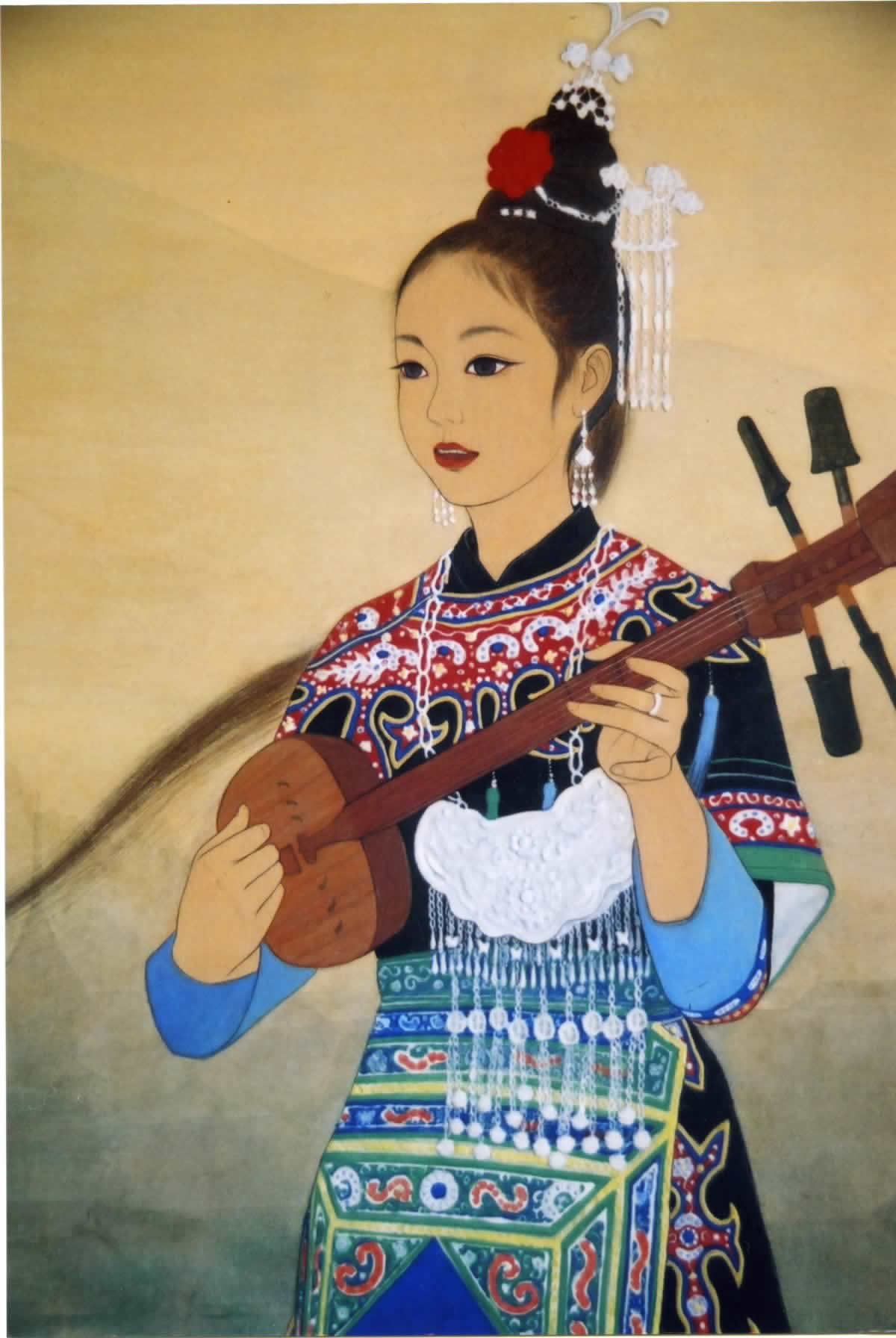
Nihonga painting "Tong Tribe Pipa-Changfamei (Guizhou, China)"

Goto has a studio in Chiba Prefecture. He travels for sketches all over Asia, and paints pictures of women ("bijin-ga") chiefly in Asia. He has held exhibitions at the British Museum, the Tokyo Metropolitan Art Museum, the Osaka City Museum of Art, the Ako City Tabuchi Museum of Art, the Paper Museum in Tokyo, Ginza Matsuzakaya Department Store, Ikebukuro Tobu Department Store, Gallery Art Salon in Chiba, Gallery Shinseido in Minamiaoyama, and Onward Gallery in Nihonbashi. He teaches about the paintings of nihonga, bijin-ga and picture books at Tokyo University of the Arts , Tokyo Zokei University, NHK Culture Center and Yomiuri Nippon Television Culture Center.

== Notable works ==
=== Nihonga paintings ===
- "Heavenly Gates"
- "Borobudur (Indonesia)"
- "Angkor Wat at sunrise (Cambodia)"
- "A beautiful girl in Bali (Indonesia)"
- "Kumari - The Living Goddess (Nepal)"
- "Sita of a dancing girl (India)"
- "A Geisha girl in Asakusa (Japan)"
- "Beautiful Village (Vietnam)"
- "A dancing girl of Miao tribe (China)"
- "Sukhothai (Thailand)"
- "Changfamei - a girl of long hair (China)"

=== Picture books ===
- The Long Hair Daughter - Changfamei (An Old Chinese Tale -Dong people)
- The Prince who became a Dog (An Old Tibetan Tale) (ISBN 978-4-00-111242-9)〈The original story of "Shuna's Journey (Hayao Miyazaki)"〉
- The Green Talking Frog〔Frog and Green Horse〕(An Old Tibetan Tale) (ISBN 978-7-5597-2468-7)
- The Girl who make Rainbow (An Old Chinese Miao Tale) (ISBN 978-4-7764-1138-3)
