= Luka Radovanović =

15th-century Catholic priest

- Born: c. 1425
- Died: 15 July 1502
- Occupation: priest

Luka Radovanović or Don Luka Radovanović was a 15th-century Catholic priest from Ragusa who was known as one in a series of early printers in the 15th- and 16th-century Republic of Ragusa.

He was chaplain of the female monastery of St. Mary of Kaštel.

It is assumed that in 1475 Radovanović could have inherited or acquired a small printing press. In December 1480 Radovanović is mentioned in one decision of Ragusan Minor Council which allowed him, as representative of the cathedral church of St Mary, to organize reparation and solidification of two water cisterns in this church. In 1487 Radovanović was mentioned in Ragusan documents as one of bookbinders of Ragusa.

On 15 October 1501 Radovanović wrote his will in which he left his printing press with "Slavic" (Glagolitic or Cyrillic) types to another priest, Pavao or Pavle Vukašinović (died in 1555). It is unknown if this printing press was operational in Ragusa, but it is certain that its types were imported from Venice according to Milan Rešetar. Radovanović died on 15 July 1502.

== Sources ==
- Tisak (1923). Jugoslavenska njiva. Tisak Hrv. štamparskog zavoda.
- Jadran (1928). Dubrovački zabavnik. Jadran.
- Institut (1950). Istorijski zapisi. Istorijski institut SR Crne Gore.
- Kolendić, Petar; Pantić, M. (1964). Iz staroga Dubrovnika. Srpska književna zadruga.
- Lukić, Radomir D. (1974). Spomenica posvecena 130 [i.e. hiljada trideset]-godisnjici zivota i rada Biblioteke Srpske akademije nauka i umetnosti. Srpska akademija nauka i umetnosti.
- Savez (1978). Arhivist. Savez društava arhivskih radnika FNRJ.
- Seferović, Relja (2008). "Dubrovački knjižari 16. stoljeća u državnoj službi". Arhivski vjesnik (in Croatian). 51 (1). Zavod za povijesne znanosti HAZU u Dubrovniku. ISSN 1848-3143.
- Šundrica, Zdravko (2008). Tajna kutija dubrovačkog arhiva. Hrvatska akademija znanosti i umjetnosti, Zavod za povijesne znanosti.
- Górecki, Piotr S.; Deusen, Nancy Elizabeth Van (2009). Central and Eastern Europe in the Middle Ages: A Cultural History. I. B. Tauris. ISBN 978-1-84511-851-8.
