= Shipwrecks of Puerto Rico =

Modern shipwrecks at Tallaboa Bay in Peñuelas, Puerto Rico.

There are more than 200 shipwrecks in the territorial waters surrounding Puerto Rico, which include the main island and smaller ones (such as Isla de Mona, which has at least 20). Almost half (45 per cent) of the shipwreck incidents that took place during the first 150 years of Spanish settlement were at San Juan, with most ships being lost due to the ongoing military conflicts and weather conditions (predominantly tropical cyclones). In modern times, the San Juan Bay has been subject to dredging initiatives that have adversely impacted the sites, with part of the wrecks now contained within an artificial island, remaining unexplored. On August 7, 1987, Public Law 10 created the Council for the Study of Subaquatic Archaeological Sites and Resources, allowing the registry of underwater remains by archaeologists. However, the entity was defunded in 2013 and has remained inactive since then. As of 2020, the documents pertaining to the shipwrecks in Puerto Rican waters remain under the custody of the Council's former director, Juan Vera.

The handling of items found in sunken ships has been historically contentious, including proposals to fund the 2010 Central American and Caribbean Games with the loot of two galleons believed to have belonged to the fleet of Francis Drake. Between the 16th and 17th centuries, there were at least 22 attempts at salvaging shipwrecks, which were mostly done independently and which employed smaller vessels. Government officials and citizens with ties to the ventures benefited from the subsequent auctions, in the case of politicians against royal laws. The protocol only allowed the wrecks that were reported within a day to be favored with a salvage operation, including the registry and auction of the cargo, with the government taking a fraction for its involvement. The practice of caretakers selling the merchandise under circumstances unfavorable to the merchants eventually led to a reform in 1550, where sold under the supervision of the Casa de Contratación and items were classified as "belongings of the dead" and shipped to Spain.

== History ==
=== Early settlement ===
During the early 16th century, San Juan Bautista (modern-day Puerto Rico) and Mona served as a supply stops for vessels traveling from Europe to the West Indies. Colonization efforts began in earnest during 1508 and were led by Juan Ponce de León, first achieving a diplomatic political accord that allowed the development of Spanish infrastructure and the elaboration of local supplies, but eventually leading to the Spanish–Taíno War of San Juan–Borikén. With the discovery of gold in the region surrounding Daguao (modern-day Luquillo and adjacent areas) during the conflict and the Spanish gaining ground, a new economy based on mining was created and proved lucrative. With more than 23,000 Castellanos being mined in its early years, the quantity surprised the Crown and led to the king noting his satisfaction and surprise at the quantity in a letter to Nicolás de Ovando y Cáceres, Governor and Captain-General of the Indies. Fuelled by Spanish expansionism and slave incursions, San Juan would also serve a military role in the appeasing of the Lesser Antilles, which were populated by refugees from the war who joined local natives.

The island would become the first Spanish harbor to be encountered after the transatlantic voyages and the last stop before them, gaining importance as a supply stop, a support station and a center of information. It also became the first place to become aware of several shipwrecks abroad and in the adjacent Lesser Antilles (which usually received local first aid) and where legal disputes concerning these started. The island was also used to hold cargo and tributes from other colonies in the New World, including the fifth. The Mona Passage also served as a point of navigational importance during these voyages, being used by vessels that wished to avoid the large quantity of pirates found off the north coast of Hispaniola and was used by the New Spain Fleet after the military value of the island increased. Puerto Rico also became one of the stops for ships damaged in the dangerous marine topography surrounding the Bahamas and the Bahamian Channel. After the establishment of Castillo de San Marcos at St. Augustine, Florida, which was accomplished with two vessels from Puerto Rico, the peninsula and the greater Antilles formed the cornerstone of a Spanish offensive in the region led by the Menéndez de Avilés fleet. Towards the century's end, the vessels of this armada would wait for fleets headed to the mainland at Puerto Rico, from where they escorted them. During this time, an additional force of galleys was assigned to the West Indies, but rarely visited Puerto Rico and resulted in an economic hindrance (due to a repair tax) that led to their eventual abolishment of the tax in 1590.

With the original town of Puerto Rico (modern-day San Juan) serving as its main port and San Germán complementing it, trading and transportation of items and treasure to Spain would gain importance during the first half of the 16th century. (Note: A political and military center, the town of Puerto Rico gained control of the goods brought from Spain, while San Germán would distribute products that were brought from Hispaniola and serve as a loading station for transatlantic voyages.) During the 1510s, a decline in the forced work force led to the introduction of African slaves, opening another maritime market with the approval of the Spanish Crown. With a decline in the Spanish population, slaves would serve as the bulk of the island's work force, both in mining and the subsequent agricultural economy that followed. When the vessels used to combat the natives failed to counter European assailants including pirates, buccaneers and privateers, the Spanish began a number of defense measures that began with the introduction of fleets, armadas and armadillas. These were only able to provide temporary defense and the enemy attacks were constant against the towns, a pattern that led to the creation of military defenses around them. In Puerto Rico, the construction of walls and castles took place on San Juan, where the largest Spanish fortress in the Western Hemisphere was built. However, other ports were not as fortified, leaving them more vulnerable to buccaneer incursions and dependent on a warning system known as avisos. This initiative also led to an increase in the slanting vessels authorized to trade in the island.

=== Illicit trade, pirates and privateers ===
By the mid-century, the mining economy gave way to new ventures, such as agriculture, which also affected the flow of vessels to Puerto Rico (and the West Indies in general) which combined with unfavorable naval provisions (???) and the proliferation of pirates in the Mona Passage, resulting in a recession. The local government made a number of requests to the Crown asking that smaller vessels were allowed to trade in the West Indies, which resulted in an increase of vessels from the Canary Islands which brought cheaper goods, a more flexible bargain system and reduced inflation concerns. (Note: Provisions only allowed large vessels to trade in the Caribbean colonies.) The Greater Antilles also benefited from other measures (???) meant to strengthen the local trade economy, but the influx of vessels was reduced and inflation returned, which in turn lead to the citizens depending less on the Spanish shipments and seeking alternatives such as smuggling contraband. Foreigners benefitted from the enterprise and while some were caught in the act, the protagonism of San Juan in the trade resulted in government officials becoming accomplices in other, less favored, regions of the island and attracting figures like John Hawkins. Efforts to avoid the prospection of clients by smugglers in the Canary Islands resulted in it being barred from to the Caribbean trade, also affecting Puerto Rico. The port town of San Germán became increasingly vulnerable with the developments of other settlements, such as Guayanilla, becoming increasingly dependent on contraband. During the 1560s, the new fleet system only granted Puerto Rico a single ship, which resulted in insufficient merchandise and exorbitant prices, in the process fuelling illegal trade. Despite measures being taken by the Crown to punish collaborators, the practice flourished for the following centuries. Dutch urcas became a common sight in the Mona Passage, while French and English ships were also prevalent as those countries expanded into the New World.

Later in the century, Puerto Rico would be used as a route to funnel the tithe to Spain through the local bishopric which was in charge of several of the Lesser Antilles, with even tribute from Central America being sent there for delivery. Pearls extracted from South America were also relayed to local ports, creating a venture that would extend for the next 200 years. Trade of other resources, such as fish and slaves, also served as part of the economic symbiosis of San Juan and the adjacent Spanish settlements. However, restrictions on the European shipments bound to the West Indies worsened inflation, forcing the local government to request aid, which came in the form of merchandise being allowed in smaller independent vessels and other exemptions that went over the Casa de Contratación. However, a few merchants exploited this arrangement to their benefit. As they expanded in the Americas, English spying, attacks and incursions became common in Puerto Rico, being carried by figures such as Walter Raleigh and Francis Drake, joining the already prevalent foreign smugglers.

After the capture of enemy vessels became profitable to the population during the 1580s, fleets of privateers were dispatched to take the burden of the military (especially in the Easter coast and the nearby islands), creating a venture that proved both successful and lucrative for the next centuries, giving rise to figures such as Miguel Enríquez. Sanctioned by the governor, local practice preceded the first formal privateer license, which was granted by the Spanish monarchy on May 7, 1625. In the 1690s, a Guarda Costas fleet was established to protect the Puerto Rican coasts, but some privateers continued being sanctioned by the governor.

Entering the next century, trade mostly benefitted traders from the Canary Islands, while San Juan retained its control over the European imports and San Germán received other resources from the adjacent islands and South America. Smuggling was still rampant throughout the Caribbean and with the war between the naval powers reaching a ceasefire, measures were taken to combat the practice. During the 1620s, war erupted between Spain and the Netherlands. The conflict reached Puerto Rico in 1625, when the Dutch attacked during the Third Battle of San Juan. By the mid-century, privateers and pirates became more abundant in the waters surrounding the Spanish West Indies while foreign nations kept expanding through the Lesser Antilles, Puerto Rico's economy was threatened by the loss of trade and its situado being captured and lost at sea several times. Despite efforts being done to favor San Juan over La Aguada, that region retained its popularity as a re-supply stop.

== Modern view ==
=== Research and documentation ===
Unlike other research venues in Puerto Rico, marine archaeology was lethargic in its growth. Until the latter half of the 20th century, public access on the documentation of the local shipwrecks was limited and featured on Shipwrecks of the Western Hemisphere, 14931825 by Robert Marx and Diccionario Bibliográfico-Histórico Comentado de Puerto Rico by Adolfo de Hostos. In 1983, Miguel Pagán Mir published a specialized book on the shipwrecks surrounding Mona Island, Naufragios en Aguas de Isla de Mona. These early documents, however, had some factual errors that were disseminated in other sources. Despite this, 19th and 20th century wrecks were covered in newspapers and other publications that were relatively accessible. Older incidents, however, required research into the collection of Spanish-era papers available to the University of Puerto Rico at Río Piedras.

The remains of a vessel at Mayagüez.

A find by Miguel Pagán Mir and Jaime Braulio managed to be recreated in the A Marine Atlas of Puerto Rico. During the 1970s, a wreck was found at San Juan's harbor, which was researched to some extent. The following decade, the Institute of Puerto Rican Culture took an interest in the subject to attend issues on lack of documentation and in an effort to deal with treasure hunters. In 1987, legislation was passed two years after Mel Fisher claimed to have found a galleon off the coast of Vieques. This was, however, mostly in response to an increment in marine treasure hunting within the waters of Puerto Rico. A committee was created within the ICP to study the area. However, this increase in interest also lead to formal study stagnating. In 1989, Walter Cardona published the first sociocultural study on the subject sourced by contemporary documents, after becoming interested in the subject when Pagán Mir (also one of his friends) was involved in the discovery of a shipwreck off the northern coast.

=== Salvage of Spanish-American ships ===
The salvage of the Manuela and Cristobal Colón, two steamships intentionally scuttled on May 6, 1898 in anticipation of the bombardment of San Juan, took place in 2001 as part of a project to dredge and expand the entrance of the San Juan Bay. Items found within were preserved for museum exhibition. The vessels themselves were refloated and laid to rest near the site of another shipwreck of that conflict, the Antonio López.

=== Proposed salvage of Drake's fleet ===
In 1991 a fisherman recovered several vase pieces, leading to the discovery of two British galleons off the coast of the municipalities of Aguadilla and Isabella. The find was reported to the ICP by the Puerto Rican Academy of Professional Diving, but the distribution of profit from the sale of items deemed "non essential" caused a conflict between its president Efraín Acevedo and the government, with the latter declining to accept 50% of the profits (as the conservation of the pieces was to take precedence). In 2009, former senator Evelyn Vázquez (who is related to Acevedo, as he was the best man of her wedding) presented a bill to promote the salvage of the shipwrecks and the sale of its contents, valued in 1,000-2,000 million dollars, in order to fund the 2010 Central American and Caribbean Games. The proposal was subjected to ridicule, and was ultimately dismissed by the administration as it would require several policy amendments to become practical.

== Timeline of historical wrecks ==
Sunk date: circumstances	Location	Ship losses	Fortune	Notes	Officers
July 1502: A fleet bound for Spain carrying impeached former governor of Santo Domingo Francisco de Bobadilla encountered a hurricane after sailing despite the warnings of Christopher Columbus, who had by this time become acquainted with the Caribbean weather and suspected the extraordinary calm seen prior to the voyage.	Mona Passage	The first major shipwreck of the West Indies. Eleven vessels were lost at the Mona Passage and the adjacent islands of Hispaniola, Mona and Puerto Rico, including the flagship Santa María de la Antigua (also known as El Dorado and Golden Hinde in other sources). In total 9 caravels, 2 naos and 1 barco sank. (Note: The term "nao" was used for a type of large multi-masted vessel, frequently (but not necessarily), the carrack.) (Note: "Barco" literally means "ship", and can refer to several types of vessels.)	The Santa María alone was carrying 12,000 gold castellanos and 3,600 pesos in cargo, including a large gold nugget (or items created from it, depending on the source).	Several items were recovered by native divers during a search ordered by the Spanish Crown the following year, but the flagship remains lost.	Captain: There are conflicting reports placing either Antonio de Torres, Andrés de Velásquez or Antonio de Terreros in charge. Masters: Martín Pacho, Juan Martín de Asejo, Juan Prieto (Santiago), Rodrigo Gutiérrez (S.M. de la Antigua), Rodrigo Prieto (Santa Clara), Hernán Pérez Matos (Antigua), Luis García, Cristóbal García, Alfonso Vanegas, García Alonso Cansino (La Cansina Vieja), Diego Bernal, Antón García Bibas (La Rábida)
1512 or 1514 (actual date unclear): Lost during the time of the Spanish-Taíno War of San Juan-Borikén, although it is not clear if it was during combat or during a storm.	Unknown; lost while "serving said Island [San Juan Bautista]".	An unnamed Spanish nao.	Unknown	Current status: Further details beyond the correspondence of Diez and the Spanish authorities are unknown.	Captain: Miguel Diez de Aux
1515: The San Nicolás was lost under unknown conditions.	Berbería Cay	A Spanish nao	Unstated		Master: Domingo de Guedln
1524: The Santa María, a ship owned by Juan López was lost along the coast during a voyage from Spain to Central America.	Off the coast of San Juan	A Spanish nao	A haul of merchandise.	The merchants that owned the ware inside gave the rights of the merchandise to several individuals. The rigging and sails were recovered and given to Diego Sánchez in 1525. That same year the items recovered were given to Francisco de Morales. In 1526, Juan Caldera was given permission to the items which were transported to Santo Domingo.	Captain: Juan Pérez de Arrecabal
August 12, 1528: In the first French offensive against Puerto Rico, privateers attacked the port of San Germán, sinking two vessels that were docked there.	San Germán shore	Two Spanish caravels	A ship full of provisions for a trip to Spain	Current status: Unknown; reported by an eyewitness.	Captain: Alonso Martel.
August 13, 1528: Following the attack against San Germán, the French privateers sunk a vessel that was captured prior to the event.	Off the coast of Cabo Rojo	A Spanish caravel	A haul from the pearl fisheries	Reported.	Captain: Not mentioned in the available documentation.
October 28, 1529: An attack by exiled Taínos or Caribs against a transport vessel took place.	San Juan harbor.	A Spanish barque and three African slaves	Five African slaves		Owner: Sebastián Hernández Barbero
July 26, 1530: A hurricane struck the island.	San Juan Bay	An unidentified navío and an unidentified ship; several damages vessels.	Unstated.		Captain: Unstated.
1531: The San Antón, a slaving and merchant vessel, was lost during a voyage from Terceira Island to the Caribbean.	Off the coast of San Juan.	A Spanish nao.	A load of merchandise		Captain: Juan de León.
1537: An unnamed ship wrecked near the capital.	The coast of San Juan	A Spanish nao.	A load of cargo.		Captain: Unstated.
May 1538: A Spanish vessel was lost during an attack by French privateers.	Off Mona Island	A Spanish caravel	4,000 pesos		Owner: Andrés González
December 1538: The San Antón was lost in the shoals while delivering a slaver's cargo. (Note: Jalil Sued Badillo cites a January 1539 date for this incident.)	Off Cabo Rojo (then a part of San Germán)	A Spanish caravel	40 African slaves, who survived the incident		Captain: Diego González
May-June 1541: A French privateer navío sunk an unnamed vessel.	Off Mona Island	A Spanish navío (Note: "Navío" translates to "vessel" and is used as a generic term for a ship.)	Unstated		Captain: Unstated
1543: A French privateer flotilla scuttled the slowest of their vessels during an engagement with the Spanish.	Off Mona Island	A French patache	Provisions.		Captain: Unstated.
1545: A hurricane struck Puerto Rico and the adjacent West Indies, destroying docked vessels.	San Juan Bay	"Six or seven" loaded ships, plus others that were empty.	"Six or seven" full loads.		Several.
1550: A storm forced several vessels against the coast.	San Juan Bay.	An unspecified number of Spanish navíos.	Unstated.		Captain: Several.
1550: The Santa María de Jesús, a vessel considered the "richest and most powerful [merchant] nao" to visit the West Indies up to this point, was lost after requesting access to port.	Off the coast of San Germán. (Note: Other authors, including John S. Potter, place this shipwreck off San Juan and provide a different list of cargo.)	A Spanish galleon	Rum, jewels, ammunition, 2 tons of iron and derivatives, 30 tons of assorted merchandise, 198 wine vessels, a pearl container and slaves (rescued) worth several thousand pesos.	After authorities were informed, governor Luis Vallejo sent a team to salvage the merchandise. Other Spanish vessels participated in the search illegally, including the San Juan captained by Cristóbal Martín, who attacked the local authorities at sword point and had his crew threaten to burn San Germán if he wasn't allowed to leave. The merchandise recovered was sold at an auction. A number of irregularities were later identified during the process, benefitting a number of influential citizens, including the governor's son in law and leading to the politician's residency and a number of lawsuits.	Captain: Diego Bernal, owner Alonso Martín.
1550: The Concepción y Espíritu Santo was lost.	San Juan Bay	A Spanish slaving ship, part of the cargo	A load of provisions and slaves (rescued)	Later that year, Cristóbal Alonso was given retribution for the cargo in name of a group from Sevilla.	Captain: Alonso Pérez de Granilla, captain and co-owner: Juan Nápoles
1550: The weather caused the loss of a French pirate vessel.	Mona Island	A French caravel	Unstated.	Crew rescued by a fellow French nao.	Unstated.
1551: After being damaged during a storm, the San Cristóbal was abandoned at port during a forceful entry.	San Juan	A Spanish nao, possibly some slaves and part of the cargo (there are conflicting reports on the documentation of the losses).	A registered load of cargo worth at least 95,306 maravedís and 700 ducats, some gold, contraband, African slaves.	The salvaged cargo was auctioned, with a percent going to the local government and the representative of the Sevilla merchants working on their behalf.	Captain: Luis de Carvajal
November 1, 1553: A group of 16 Carib ships ambushed an anchored Spanish vessel and attacked throughout the day, eventually succeeding in its capture and burning it.	Coast of Vieques.	A Spanish caravel.	Provisions for a transatlantic trip.	The crew was taken to the Carib chiefs as slaves, later attacking the settlement of Humacao.	Pilot: Francisco de Perea.
August-September 1554: A ship was struck by a hurricane en route to San Juan.	Mona Passage	A Spanish nao with its tribulation and passengers	Provisions	Reported in October 1554. Never recovered.	Owner: Juan González
January 4, 1560: The San Juan was lost against a reef.	San Juan Bay	A Spanish galliot	A load of contraband and wine.	Some documents suggest that African slaves were used to recover what they could.	Captain: Andrés Lorenzo
1562: The San Esteván was lost under unspecified conditions.	San Germán	A Spanish nao	Unspecified	Reported	Captain: Lázaro Morel
1564: A vessel was burned during an attack by Carib natives.	Guayama harbor	A Spanish nao or caravel, the crew was killed or slaved with only one escaping.	6,000 pesos were reported in losses	Reclamation was filled for the damages	Captain: Luis Melchor
Between 1564 and 1567: The San Julián was lost.	Off San Juan	A Spanish navío	A haul of cargo	A complaint was filled claiming that the cargo was relocated to this vessel without proper considerations. Part of the cargo was salvaged.	Captain: Juanetin Ferrer
May 10, 1565: The Sant Bartolomé sunk after encountering a reef.	Off Guayama	A Spanish navío	A ship full of African slaves.		Master: Lorenzo Ramírez
July 1566: A damaged Espíritus Santo lost part of its cargo in harbor, later being sunk.	Guayama harbor.	A Spanish nao, part of the cargo	A 106 African slaves (rescued)	The merchandise was confiscated on suspicions of contraband and the slaves sold. Another part of it was salvaged.	Master: Baltasar Barbosa
November 22, 1567: An anchored vessel was burned by Carib natives during an incursion. (Note: Cayetano Coll y Toste cited a 1565 date not supported by primary sources.)	Coast of Guayanilla	Spanish navío, most of the passengers	Unstated	The governor counterattacked in an offensive where both sides suffered losses and the Caribs left with their captives.	Master: Simón
January 25, 1568: The Espíritus Santo was deliberately sunk while entering harbor in an attempt to lose pursuing enemy ships.	Guayama harbor	A Spanish avíso navío	Correspondency of the Crown, Royal avísos. A load valued in at least 10,561 pesos.	The documents were delivered to the Real Audiencia de Santo Domingo following month. What was salvaged was auctioned.	Master: Francisco Maldonado
August 1573: The flagship of a Canarian fleet sunk after being damaged by a storm at sea and forcing its entry.	San Juan harbor	A Canarian (English owned and built) frigate	Unstated.	The involvement of the English lead to the governor requesting their arrest and an investigation being open.	Captain: Francisco Nuñez de la Peña
1577: The San Miguel sank off the coast.	Off San Germán	A Portuguese navío	Unstated	The sails and other cloths were auctioned.	Hernán Suárez de Melo
June 27, 1585: The Nuestra Señora de la Misericordia sunk after running into shoals.	Off Loíza	A Spanish navío	A load containing one of two assigned shipments from the Canary Islands.	Part of the merchandise was salvaged.	Master: Francisco Hernández
April 5, 1588: The Nuestra Señora del Rosario sunk at harbor.	San Juan	A Spanish navío	A load of Canarian cargo	Part of the merchandise was salvaged.	Master: Sebastián Asencio
April 1589: A vessel transporting a team charged with inspecting the Caribbean fortifications crashed against a reef.	San Juan	A Spanish navío	A load of provisions	Provisions were replaced by the local government; only partial salvage was possible	Master: Unstated
November 26, 1589: The San Juan Gargatúa was lost at harbor.		A Spanish navío	A load of cargo	Part of the cargo was salvaged	Master: Francisco González
April 11, 1591: A slaving vessel captured by English privateers was sunk in retaliation for failure to trade.	Off the west coast	A Portuguese slaving ship	300 African slaves (landed) and provisions		Master: Christopher Newport (original)
April 1592: English privateers burnt one of their captures to proceed in their hunt.	Off western Puerto Rico	Spanish caravel; either a slaver ship or a cargo ship	Unclear; either 270 African slaves or a load of Canarian wine	Cargo relocated	Master: Unstated
March 1595: Robert Dudley disposed of a vessel captured abroad after failing to trade.	Off Cabo Rojo	A small Spanish vessel	Unstated	Recorded by Dudley	Master: Unstated
1595: The Nuestra Señora de Begoña and La Pandorga were sunk as an obstacle to Francis Drake's fleet during the Battle of San Juan.	San Juan Bay	A Spanish galleon and a Spanish nao	Unstated	The wreck of the vessel was still visible three years later.	Master: Pedro Milanes (La Pandorga), Sancho Pardo Osorio (N.S. de Begońa)
November 23, 1595: The Nuestra Señora de la Magdalena and several Spanish vessels were destroyed in an exchange where the English launched a surprise attack during the Battle of San Juan.	San Juan Bay	A Spanish frigate, 10 English skiffs, an English tender	Unstated	Part of the Magdalena's crew was arrested by the English. The crew of the tender was arrested. In the ensuing battle, the English suffered around 400 losses, while the Spanish loss around 40. In 1597, the bronze cannons of the Magdalena were salvaged by the governor and turned into bells.	Captain: Domingo de Insaurraga (N.S. de la Magdalena)
November 24, 1595: The San Francisco, the Tejada and an unmanned vessel were sunk to block access to the bay during the Battle of San Juan.	San Juan Bay	A French navío, a Spanish frigate and a Spanish nao	A load of sugar, spices and hides (San Francisco) and a load of merchandise and artillery (Tejada)	Drake eventually desisted in his incursion and left towards the mainland, where he died shortly afterwards.	Owner/Captain: Pedro Sedeño (San Francisco), Pedro Tello de Gúzman (Tejada) and Juan Díaz de Santana (unnamed ship)
November 25, 1595: Having been damaged during the Battle of San Juan, The Exchange was ultimately lost despite the measures taken.	Off Mona Island	An English merchantman	Unstated		Captain: Captain Winter
June 7, 1598: A vessel of the invading forces led by George Clifford was wrecked against shoals during the exchanges that lead to the Second Battle of San Juan.	San Juan	An English warship	Unstated	Over a dozen artillery pieces were salvaged by the Spanish.	Captain: Unstated
1598: A ship was lost while escaping pirates	Río Grande	A Spanish navío	Documents	The documents were saved, but a subsequent military salvage failed to save the ship.	Captain: Unstated
1599: An English ship was lost against reefs or shoals.	Off Caja de Muertos	An English skiff	Unstated		Pilot: George Mudd
1601: A military ship (possibly the San José) was lost entering the harbor.	San Juan harbor	A Spanish nao	Military provisions	Salvage operations managed to recover part of the load	Master: Francisco de Morales
October 26, 1605: The San Antonio sunk due to structural damage.	Mona Passage	A Spanish nao (flagship of a fleet)	Unstated		Master: Lucas Guillen
1606: An unnamed vessel accompanied by the New Spain Fleet was lost off the coast.	Northern Puerto Rico	A Canarian ship	Spanish correspondence	The governor informed the Crown about the loss	Master: Unstated
December 31, 1608: A ship was burned following an unsuccessful trade attempt.	Western coast	A British navío	Unstated	The governor informed the Crown about the incident	Master: Unstated
September 12, 1615: Hurricane San Leonicio tossed several ships against the coast.	San Juan harbor	Two Spanish navíos, a Spanish sloop	Sugar, hides, ginger (on board the navíos)	The governor made arrangements to salvaged other vessels stranded during the storm.	Captain: Andrés Camelo, several others
1619: A Spanish offensive sunk a Dutch privateer's vessel.	Off eastern Puerto Rico	A Dutch urca	Unstated		Captain: Unstated
Between 1619 and 1621: A vessel became wedged between rocks shortly after being launched.	Shore of Vega Alta	A Spanish nao	Unstated	Efforts undertaken by the governor to save the ship failed.	Owner: Pedro de Biliarte
1622: The San Antonio was lost against the coast after an emergency entry to port.	San Juan harbor	A Spanish slaver ship	92 African slaves and cargo	The slaves and cargo were sold and custom duties (???) worth some 43,348 reales and 6 maravedís were acquired.	Master: Francisco Pastrana
1623: A vessel was lost mid-voyage	Northern coast	A Spanish navío	Merchandise for a transatlantic voyage		Captain: Unstated
November 1623: A vessel (possibly the San Joseph) belonging to the Armada de Cuatro Villas was lost against shoals due to the weather.	San Juan harbor	A Spanish galleon	Military ammunitions	Efforts to save the ship failed. The governor informed the Crown of the loss. Ammunition, provisions, parts and 19 cannons were salvaged and integrated to El Morro.	Captain: Possibly Martin Pérez de Liendo
October 1625: The defeated Dutch burned several vessels during their retreat including the navío Nuestra Señora del Rosario y San Antonio and the nao Nuestra Señora de la Consolación.	San Juan harbor	Between two and seven Spanish ships			Owner: Andrés Botello de Cabrera (N.S. del Rosario y San Antonio), José Muñoz (N.S. de la Consolación)
Between 1625 and 1630: A vessel (possibly the Jesús María) was lost trying to make its way in.	San Juan Bay	A Spanish navío	Cargo including wine	Part of the cargo was sold	Master: Gonzálo Benítez
April 14, 1626: The Payón Gallego was sunk by a Dutch ship while sailing from Puerto Rico to Hispaniola.	Mona Passage	A Spanish vessel	Unstated	The crew was taken and some of it was left at Hispaniola.	Owner: Pedro de Vargas
September 15, 1626: The San Juan Bautista and another ship were lost during a storm.	San Juan harbor	A Canarian navío and a sloop	A load of wine (San Juan Bautista)		Master: Antonio Beloso (San Juan Bautista)
August 7, 1635: The Nuestra Señora de Pena de Francia was lost due to the weather conditions.	San Juan harbor	A Spanish nao	Provisions and 262 wine vessels.	Around half of the wine was salvaged along other items, which were legally registered and what was viable auctioned.	Captain: Gaspar Luis Master: Antonio González
1636: A foreigner ship was wrecked and part of its crew captured.	Off Puerto Rico	An English vessel	The prisoners were confronted by the governor.	Unstated	Captain: Unstated
1638: Two vessels were lost in a storm.	Off Coamo	Two English ships	Unstated	A survivor from France was interrogated at San Juan.	Captain: Unstated
October 4, 1645: A Canarian vessel captured off the harbor sank, likely intentionally, by the Dutch ship that captured it.	Off San Juan	A Canarian nao	Unstated		Captain: Unstated
August 28, 1649: The Cattus (also known as Katt and El Gallo) was burned after being damaged against reefs and rescue operations were hindered by a storm.	Palominos	A Swedish warship	Provisions	The men were involved in the failed rescue attempt while the rest of the crew remained at Palominos. After being marooned for days a Spanish contingent took their belongings and remaining provisions and took the passengers to San Juan. There they remained and some were given jobs. The Spanish salvaged part of the cargo and its artillery. A rescue attempt by a Dutch vessel named El Profeta Daniel ended with it being confiscated by the government. An authorized voyage ended with the Swedes being attacked by French pirates on their way to New Sweden. The matter was later attended through diplomatic means and the Glicen Hais transported Henrrique Helsuit, who was able to receive economic compensation but the Swedes decided to stay behind. For his involvement in the matter, ex-governor Fernando de la Riva Agüero was prosecuted.	Captain: Cornelius Joarsin Luque
May 6, 1898: The Manuela and Cristobal Colón are scuttled to prevent American access to the bay.	San Juan Bay	Two Spanish steamboats		Salvaged in 2001	
July 16, 1898: The Antonio López was bombed by the USS New Orleans during the Spanish-American War.	Off Dorado; 18°28′48″N 66°13′50″W	A transoceanic steamer belonging to the Compañía Transatlántica Española.	Military provisions	Ramón Acha Caamaño ordered the salvage of the ship's cargo.	Owner: Claudio López, 2nd Marquess of Comillas

A number of wrecks listed by Pierre Chaunu, Robert F. Marx, Adolfo de Hostos and Orrin H. Pilkey are modified and/or omitted due to errors in location or conflicting/absent official records supporting the purported relation with Puerto Rican waters. A number of vessels identified as galleons by Miguel Pagán Mir have been corrected to their actual model using primary sources. Captain Diego Bernal, misnamed as "Domingo" by Alejandro Tapia y Rivera and several authors that followed, has been corrected with primary sources. An editor's mistake in Fray Íñigo Abbad y Lasierra's account of the Santa María de Jesús has been corrected.
