= Kumiko Goto-Azuma =

Antarctic palaeoclimatologist and glaciologist

- Education: Hokkaido University
- Awards: Hirata Prize (1998)
- Scientific career
- Fields: Palaeoclimatology; Glaciology
- Workplaces: Director of the Ice Core Research Center, National Institute of Polar Research
- Website: Kumiko Goto-Azuma at the National Institute of Polar Research

Kumiko Goto-Azuma is an Antarctic palaeoclimatologist and glaciologist and Director of the Ice Core Research Center at the National Institute of Polar Research, Japan.

== Early life and education ==
Goto-Azuma obtained her D. Eng in March 1986 from Hokkaido University.

== Career and impact ==
Goto-Azuma has analysed ice cores from both polar regions and participated in Antarctic research expeditions to study the deep ice cores drilled at Dome Fuji. She analyses Arctic and Antarctic deep ice cores, with the goal of shedding light on the mechanism of glacial-interglacial cycles and the mechanisms behind the millennial-scale changes in global climate and environment.

Goto-Azuma has served as a Vice-President of the International Association of Cryospheric Sciences and on the Council of the International Glaciological Society. She is on the steering committees of the Japan Consoritum for Arctic Environmental Research, International Partnerships in Ice Core Sciences (IPICS), the committee of the East Greenland Ice-core Project, the Dome Fuji Ice Core Consortium and the Japan Consortium for Arctic Environmental Research. She has been appointed as a Science Adviser of the Ministry of Education, Culture, Sports, Science and Technology (MEXT), Japan as of April 2016.

== Awards and honours ==
Goto-Azuma was awarded the Hirata Prize of the Japanese Society of Snow and Ice in 1998. She also received a European Commission Marie Curie Fellowship Supporting international mobility and training in Bizkaia (B-MOB).
