= Pierino Belli =

16th-century Italian soldier and jurist

Pierino Belli (20 March 1502, in Alba – 31 December 1575, in Turin) was a soldier and jurist.

Belli served the Holy Roman Empire as the commander of Imperial forces in Piedmont. In 1560, Emmanuel Philibert, Duke of Savoy, named him a councillor of state. He is most notable for his book, De re militari et de bello (1563) which was one of the most comprehensive treatments of military law and the rules of war that had been written up to that time.

== Biography ==
Son of the Alba nobles Berentina and Pietro Antonio, Pierino (or Petrino) Belli shared both family sympathies for the March of Montferrat and the empire and a dislike for the Marquis of Saluzzo and France. Unlike his brother Bartolomeo, however, it was not in military endeavors that he distinguished himself, but in the more congenial field of law. After his early studies in Alba, in fact, he had attended the University of Perugia and Pavia, graduating in Doctor of both laws.

In 1533, having given Alba to the people of Saluzzo, he moved with his family to Asti, where he continued to practice law, becoming vicar of the praetorship and patron of the municipality. On June 22, 1537, he welcomed Charles V to Alba, retaken from the imperials, but did not return to live there as his brothers did.The same year he was appointed judge of crimes and military disputes in the imperial army. He was also adviser to the duke of Mantua Philip II of Spain Gonzaga, who had meanwhile become lord of Montferrat, whom he induced to remain loyal to the emperor in the constant wars that broke out between France and Spain. As a reward, in 1552, Philip II appointed him senator of the duchy of Milan.

After the peace of Treaty of Cateau-Cambrésis (April 2–3, 1559), Emmanuel Philibert, Duke of Savoy entrusted him with the reorganization of the Savoy duchy from a legislative and judicial point of view, including him (November 1560) among his six state councillors, using him for difficult Diplomatic mission (such as the recovery of the five strongholds of Turin, Chieri, Chivasso, Pinerolo and Villanova d'Asti still in French hands, which lasted from 1562 to 1574) and deferring to his expertise in resolving a variety of legal and border issues.

== Bibliography ==
- (in Italian) treccani.it
- (in Italian) http://www.centrostudibeppefenoglio.it/Personaggi/personaggi_scheda.php?ID=8
