= Jon Simonssøn =

Norwegian city manager, lawspeaker, and humanist

Jon Simonssøn (9 November 1512 – 29 July 1575) or Jon Simonsson, was a Norwegian city manager, lawspeaker and a humanist.
