= Great Scribe of Lithuania =

Office in the Polish–Lithuanian Commonwealth

Great Scribe of Lithuania (Lithuanian: Lietuvos didysis raštininkas; Latin: notarius magnus Lithuaniae) was a central, though non-Senatorial, office in the Grand Duchy of Lithuania. The Great Scribe served as an adviser to the Grand Duke of Lithuania and his chancellor.

== History of the office ==
The office was created in 1504, in the Grand Duchy of Lithuania where there were three such positions, compared to only one in the Crown of Poland. The office was often staffed by Catholic clergy. In 1764, the Convocation sejm of the Polish–Lithuanian Commonwealth rearranged the number of positions, establishing two offices for the Grand Duchy and the Crown each, and restricted it to non-clergy. In 1775 the number of offices was doubled, and it was decided that one of the four would be staffed by a secular person while the other three were filled once again by clergy.

== Responsibilities ==
The responsibility of the Great Scribe was to prepare properly worded versions and announcements of new laws which were put into effect. The office issued ready documents and certificates for individuals that these were sometimes addressed to. A Great Scribe was often part of diplomatic missions to foreign rulers. The scribe also was part, with veto power, of the Grand Duke of Lithuania and King of Poland Judicial Court (which ruled mostly on matters related to cities' rights and burghers). He was also responsible for writing out the sentences passed by this court.
