= Suguru Goto =

Japanese composer and new media artist

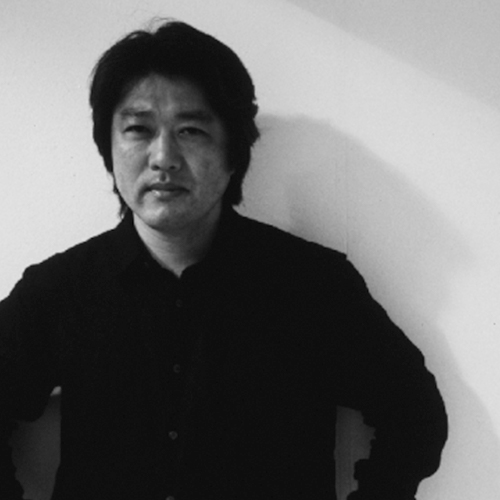

Background information
- Origin: Japan
- Genres: contemporary music
- Label: Athor Harmonics
- Website: http://gotolab.geidai.ac.jp

Suguru Goto (後藤 英, Gotō Suguru) is a Japanese composer and new media artist who lives in Paris. He performances using new technology such as projection mapping, Kinect, motion capture and robotics and programming which he invented himself. He integrates dances, sounds and images into the performance, highlighting boundaries between human and machine, reality and virtual. He was also a researcher and invited composer at IRCAM. He is currently professor at Tokyo University of the Arts.

== Biography ==
After he studied composition and piano in Japan, he moved to the United States to continue his studies at New England Conservatory in Boston. He preceded his post-graduate studies at Technische Universität Berlin and HDK in Berlin, Germany. Under Dieter Schnebel, professor of experimental music, Suguru Goto started his practices in mixing various representations : sound, dance and image. After having pursued his research in IRCAM and Paris University in France, he has been living in Paris for more than 20 years. In 2009, Suguru Goto was invited to Venice Biennale and His work "RoboticMusic" was played there.[1] In 2016, his first book “Emprise[2]” was published in Tokyo. Suguru Goto explains the history and development of computer and electronic music in pursuing movements, since Romantic music. At the same year, his CD “CsO” was published from Athor Harmonics, in Tokyo. To celebrate these publications, Suguru Goto cooperated with three artists; Antoine Schmitt, Lucio Arese and Patrick Defasten to the performance, using sounds of "CsO". This performance was played in March 2016 in Tokyo. He studied composition with Lukas Foss and Earl Brown in U.S.A, and with Robert Cogan at New England Conservatory and Dieter Schnebel in Berlin, Tristan Murail and Philippe Manour at IRCAM, Paris.

== Selected works ==
- SuperPolm：This is Virtual Musical Instrument. Instead of string, it comes with sensors and eight-button keyboard which can change the sound and the pitch.
- RoboticMusic : This performance involves 5 robots musicians. These robots are able to exceed the physical limits of humain being, e.g. being able to play at a first tempo that can not be marched as well as being able to playing very complex pieces.
- CsO：CsO means "One composes a body without organs" and is related to the project "artificial body and real body". It's a visual and sound montage which includes the texts of Mille Plateaux of Deleuze and Guattari and the radio piece of Antonin Artaud : Pour en finir avec le jugement de Dieu.The video image shows real and 3D virtual bodies but the body of the performer is present and can transform its images in real time.
- Augmented Body and Virtual Body：The performance involves robots which play musical instruments, in this the danser will where the robotic suit which will control the robots music performance though the dances mouvements.
- netBody
- L'homme transcende
- Cymatics
- Duali：Using the controllers of gestures, Wifi and programming which make sounds in real time, this performance is made up of images, dance and music. This is also based upon the concepts of Dualism like man – machine or Asia and Europe.
- Hypnoid
- Duali Ver.2

In addition to these musical works, Suguru Goto is the author of an important book (in Japanese) about the history and the practices of electroacoustic and computer music. The book discusses the recent interactive techniques that Goto himself knows quite well. The book is called Emprise and was published in 2016 in Japan by Enjoying Culture Editions (bunka o tanoshimu shubbansha).

== Selected awards ==
- Prix Ars Electronica 2013 Digital Musics & Sound Art Honorary Mention (2013)
- THE 2013 KAO INTERNATIONAL KINETIC ART COMPETITION AWARDS, the 2nd prize (Florida, 2013)
- Action Sharing 2 (Italy, 2011)
- Electronic Sonority Honor Award Prize, FILE PRIX LUX, (Brazil, 2010)
- DICREAM, French Cultural Minister (Paris, 2010)
- OFQJ-dance and new technology prize at Bains Numérique #4, International Festival of digital art of Enghein-Les-Bains (France 2009)
- Music Theater Award 2008 (BERLIN, 2008)
- DICREAM, French Cultural Minister (Paris, 2008)
- DICREAM, French Cultural Minister (Paris, 2002)
- Berliner Kompositionaufträge, Cultural Minister (BERLIN, 1993)
- The first prize at the Marzena (Seattle, 1990)
- Boston Symphony Orchestra Fellowship (Boston, 1989)
- Koussevitzky Prize, Tanglewood Music Festival (USA, 1989)
