= Goto Yujo =

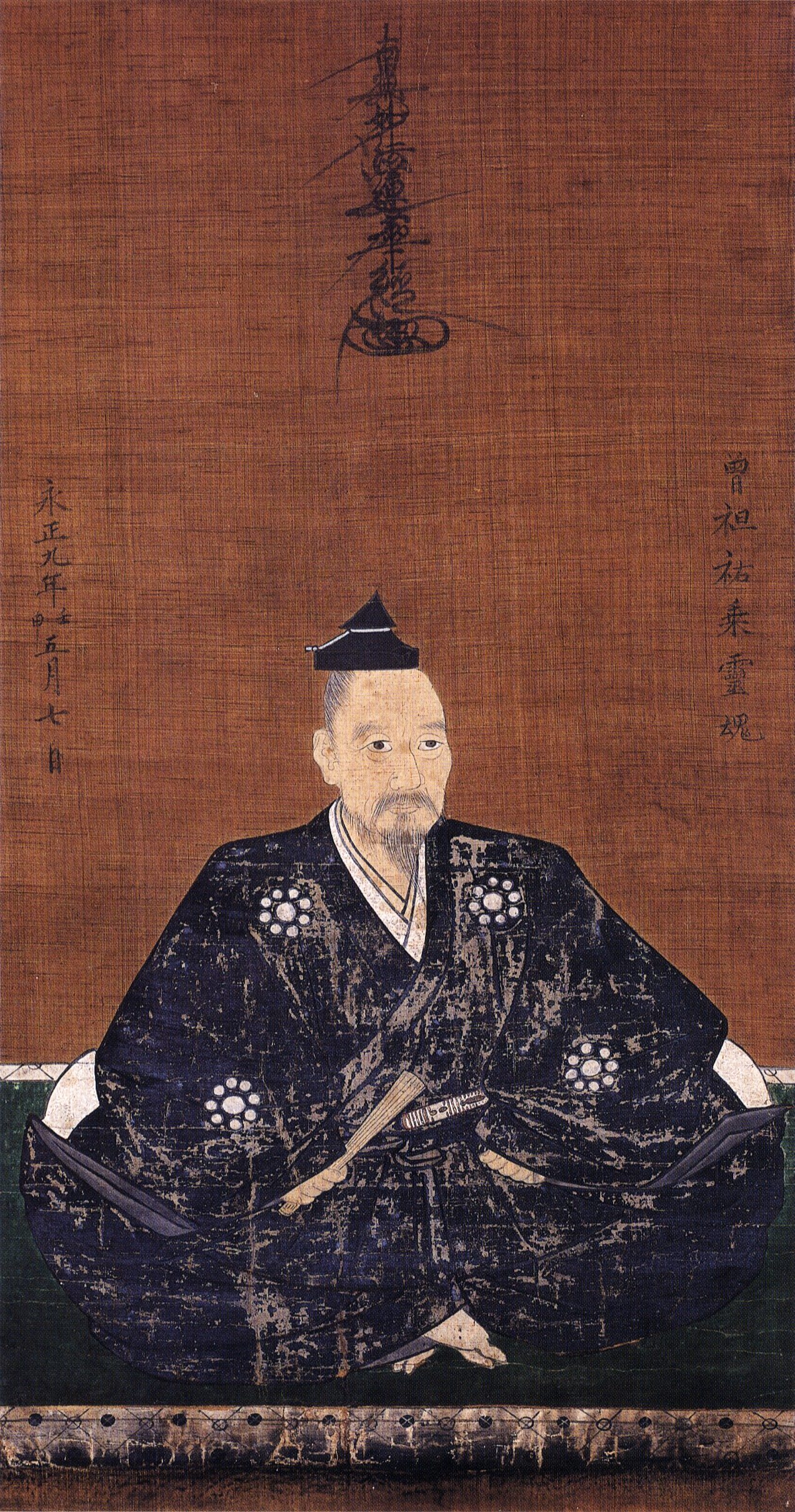
Portrait of Gotō Yūjō

Gotō Yūjō (後藤 祐乗, 1440 – June 20, 1512) was a famous artisan, and the founder of the Goto Family line of Japanese sword fittings makers.

Yujo is said to have been a retainer to Ashikaga Yoshimasa and was initially employed to establish a government mint to control the making and quality of gold currency. He became famous as the founder of one of many great families of craftsmen of parts for swords The family continued to produce tsuba until the death of his final descendant in 1856. The tsuba was noted as a reflection of the specific time period and school that designed them. Goto family work features a finely granulated ground texture called nanako which resembles fine rows of caviare. Nanako actually means 'fish-eggs'. The primary alloy they used was shakudo, a mixture of copper and a few percent of gold. This alloy was treated in a bath of copper salts to develop a lustrous black patina. This black background, with inlaid details in gold and silver, is characteristic of the family's work and was copied by many less prestigious workshops. Although he never signed his work many piece attributed to him are extant today.
