= 1511 =

1511 in various calendars
- Gregorian calendar: 1511; MDXI
- Ab urbe condita: 2264
- Armenian calendar: 960; ԹՎ ՋԿ
- Assyrian calendar: 6261
- Balinese saka calendar: 1432–1433
- Bengali calendar: 917–918
- Berber calendar: 2461
- English Regnal year: 2 Hen. 8 – 3 Hen. 8
- Buddhist calendar: 2055
- Burmese calendar: 873
- Byzantine calendar: 7019–7020
- Chinese calendar: 庚午年 (Metal Horse); 4208 or 4001 — to — 辛未年 (Metal Goat); 4209 or 4002
- Coptic calendar: 1227–1228
- Discordian calendar: 2677
- Ethiopian calendar: 1503–1504
- Hebrew calendar: 5271–5272
- Hindu calendars
- Vikram Samvat: 1567–1568
- Shaka Samvat: 1432–1433
- Kali Yuga: 4611–4612
- Holocene calendar: 11511
- Igbo calendar: 511–512
- Iranian calendar: 889–890
- Islamic calendar: 916–917
- Japanese calendar: Eishō 8 (永正８年)
- Javanese calendar: 1428–1429
- Julian calendar: 1511; MDXI
- Korean calendar: 3844
- Minguo calendar: 401 before ROC 民前401年
- Nanakshahi calendar: 43
- Thai solar calendar: 2053–2054
- Tibetan calendar: ལྕགས་ཕོ་རྟ་ལོ་ (male Iron-Horse); 1637 or 1256 or 484 — to — ལྕགས་མོ་ལུག་ལོ་ (female Iron-Sheep); 1638 or 1257 or 485

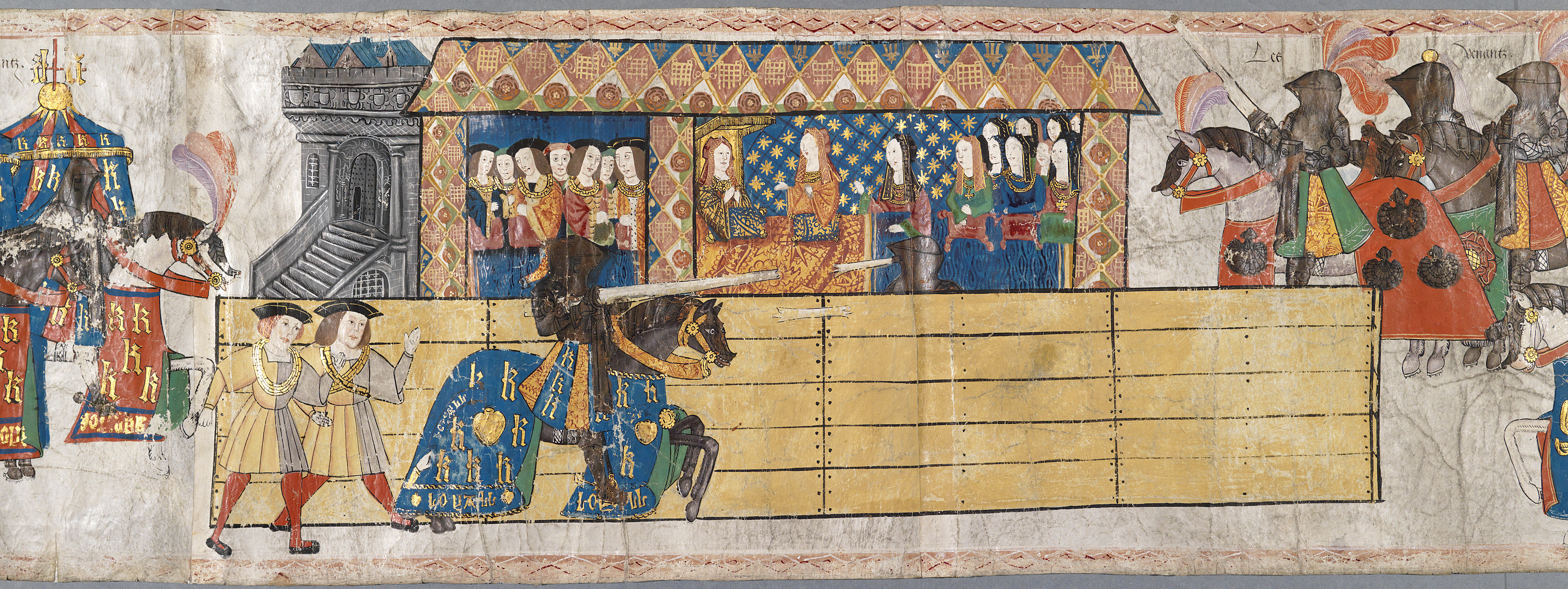
February 12: England's King Henry VIII celebrates the birth of his first son with the Westminster Tournament of jousting, commemorated by panorama of 36 paintings (pictured, a section of the Westminster Roll)

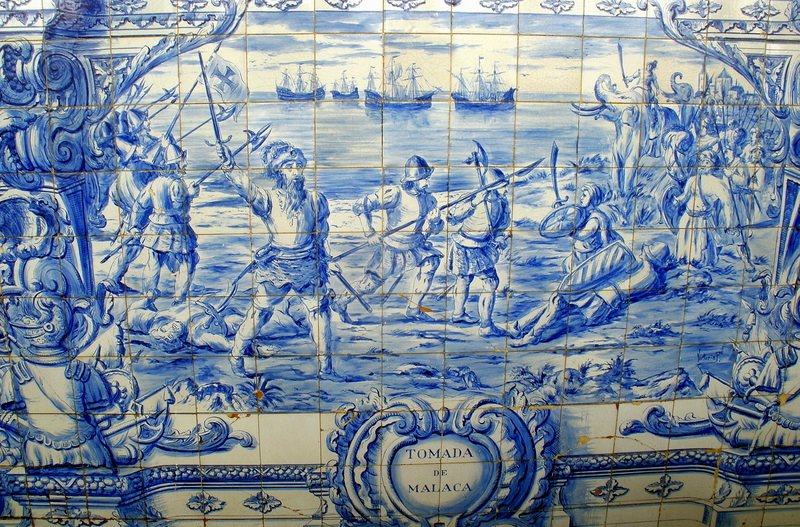
August 15: Malacca is captured by the forces of Afonso de Albuquerque of Portugal.

Year 1511 (MDXI) was a common year starting on Wednesday of the Julian calendar.

== Events ==
=== January–March ===
- January 19 – The Siege of Mirandola by the Papal States, with help from the Duchy of Urbino and Spanish and Venetian troops, ends with the capture of Mirandola after 18 days of fighting. The Pope personally leads the troops and, after the outnumbered defenders surrender, works at preventing his troops from pillaging the city or harming the residents.
- February 12 – King Henry VIII of England opens the two-day Westminster Tournament to celebrate the birth (on January 1) of his son Prince Henry. Sadly, the infant prince dies on February 22, nine days after the tournament's end. The festivities are later memorialized in the 1511 Westminster Tournament Roll, a series of 36 separately painted pictures stitched together to form a roll almost 60 feet (18 m) long and 14 3/4 inches (37.5 cm) wide.
- February 22 – (9th waning of Tabaung 872 ME In what is now Myanmar, King Shwenankyawshin Narapati II of Ava dedicates his "exquisite golden palace".
- February 27 – In Italy, on "Fat Thursday", a Christian celebration marking the last days of feasting before the period of fasting during the Roman Catholic Lent, discontented citizens of Friuli stage a revolt against their Venetian occupiers and attack the city of Udine and invade the palaces of several members of nobility, murdering the wealthy families and plundering the palace contents. Special troops arrive from Gradisca d'Isonzo on March 1 and suppress the rebellion.
- March 11 – On the island of Puerto Rico, Spanish conquistador Juan Ponce de León leads an incursion at Yahuecas against the local Taino warriors, commanded by Chief Urayoán.
- March 26 – A 6.9 magnitude earthquake strikes Slovenia and Italy and kills more than 10,000 people, striking with a maximum Mercalli intensity of X (Extreme). The epicenter is around the town of Idrija in present-day Slovenia, although some place it some 15-20 kilometers to the west, between Gemona and Pulfero in Friulian Slovenia. The earthquake affects a large territory between Carinthia, Friuli, present-day Slovenia and Croatia.

=== April–June ===
- April 9
  - St John's College, Cambridge, England, founded by Lady Margaret Beaufort, receives its charter.
  - The Şahkulu Rebellion breaks out in Anatolia.
- May 16 – Five Roman Catholic cardinals, including Federico di Sanseverino, sign a document calling upon Pope Julius II to convene a council in Pisa to discuss reform of the Roman Catholic Church, to take place on September 1. After the Pope threatens him with excommunication, Sanseverino elects not to attend.
- May 23 – French troops capture the Italian city of Bologna after a two-day battle.
- June 21 – in Spain, Queen Queen Joanna of Castile creates the Consulate of the Sea for the port of Bilbao.

=== July–September ===
- July 2 – The Şahkulu rebellion, which had started in Anatolia by Sakhulu Baba, against the Ottoman Empire on April 9, is suppressed in southeastern Turkey by the Ottoman Grand Vizier, Hadım Ali Pasha and Prince Şehzade Ahmed, son of the Sultan Bayezid II. Sakhulu is subsequently beheaded.
- July 11 – Pope Julius II summons Catholic clerics to meet at the Fifth Council of the Lateran, directing them to meet on April 19.
- July 25 – Afonso de Albuquerque of Portugal, Governor of Portuguese India, begins an assault on the strategic city of Malacca (now part of Malaysia) and captures it by August 15.
- July 29 – Henry VIII of England's flagship, the Mary Rose, is launched from Portsmouth.
- August 14 – In Rome, the completed first half of Michelangelo's painting of Biblical scenes on the Sistine Chapel ceiling is unveiled for a select group of patrons and church officials. The viewing is open to the public the next day.
- August 15 – (21 Jumada I 917 AH) Capture of Malacca: Afonso de Albuquerque of Portugal conquers Malacca, the capital of the Sultanate of Malacca, giving Portugal control over the Strait of Malacca, through which all sea-going trade between China and India is concentrated. The Sultanate then establishes rule from Johor, starting decades of skirmishes against the Portuguese to regain the fallen city. While taking the city, the Portuguese slaughter a large community of Chinese merchants living there. Malacca is the first city in Southeast Asia to be taken by a Western nation, gaining home rule only in 1957, when it becomes part of Malaysia.
- September 13 – In Japan, Tokudaiji Saneatsu retires from his position as Chancellor of the Realm (Daijō-daijin) after two years of leading the Council of State.
- September 27. Imperial troops capture Gradisca d'Isonzo from the Venetians, also operating in other parts of Friuli and northern Italy, together with their French allies.

=== October–December ===
- October 4 – The Holy League is formed, against French dominance in Italy. It is an alliance between the Papal States, the Republic of Venice, and the Kingdom of Aragon, with several other powers joining later (the Swiss Confederation, the Holy Roman Empire, the Kingdom of England). On the next day in Rome, the creation of the Holy League is publicly proclaimed by the Pope Julius II.
- October 12 – James IV of Scotland's great ship, the Michael, is launched at Newhaven, Edinburgh; she is the largest ship afloat at this date.
- November 17 – The Treaty of Westminster creates an alliance between Henry VIII of England and Ferdinand II of Aragon against France. Mallett and Shaw, The Italian Wars, 103; Hutchinson, Young Henry, 159.
- November 20 – The vessel Frol de la Mar, transporting Afonso de Albuquerque and the valuable treasure of the conquest of Malacca, sinks en route to Goa.
- November 23 – In India, Mahmud Shah Begada, Sultan of Gujarat since 1458, dies at the age of 66 after a reign of more than 50 years. He is succeeded by his eldest son, Prince Shams-ud-Din Muzaffar, who takes the name Muzaffar Shah II.
- December 21 – In an impassioned sermon on the fourth Sunday of Advent at Santo Domingo, Dominican friar Antonio de Montesinos openly denounces the Spanish conquistadors' cruelty and abuse of the Taino people practice of Encomienda (forcible enslavement of non-Christian peoples) on the island of Hispanola. and adds that neither he nor any of his missionaries will allow slaveholders to partake in confession.

=== Date unknown ===
- Diego Velázquez and Hernán Cortés conquer Cuba; Velázquez is appointed Governor.
- Duarte Barbosa arrives in India for the second time. He works as clerk in the factory of Cananor, and as the liaison with the Indian rajah.
- After the fall of Malacca, Afonso de Albuquerque sends Duarte Fernandes on a diplomatic mission to Burma and Siam, becoming the first European to visit these countries diplomatically.
- Ferdinand II of Aragon observes that "one black can do the work of four Indians".
- Juan de Agramonte, a sailor from Spain, is thought possibly to have travelled to Newfoundland.
- The indigenous Taíno people revolt against the Spanish in southwestern Puerto Rico near Guánica.
- The first black slaves arrive in Colombia.
- The Spanish conquest of Yucatán begins.
- Erasmus publishes his most famous work, The Praise of Folly (Laus stultitiae).

== Births ==
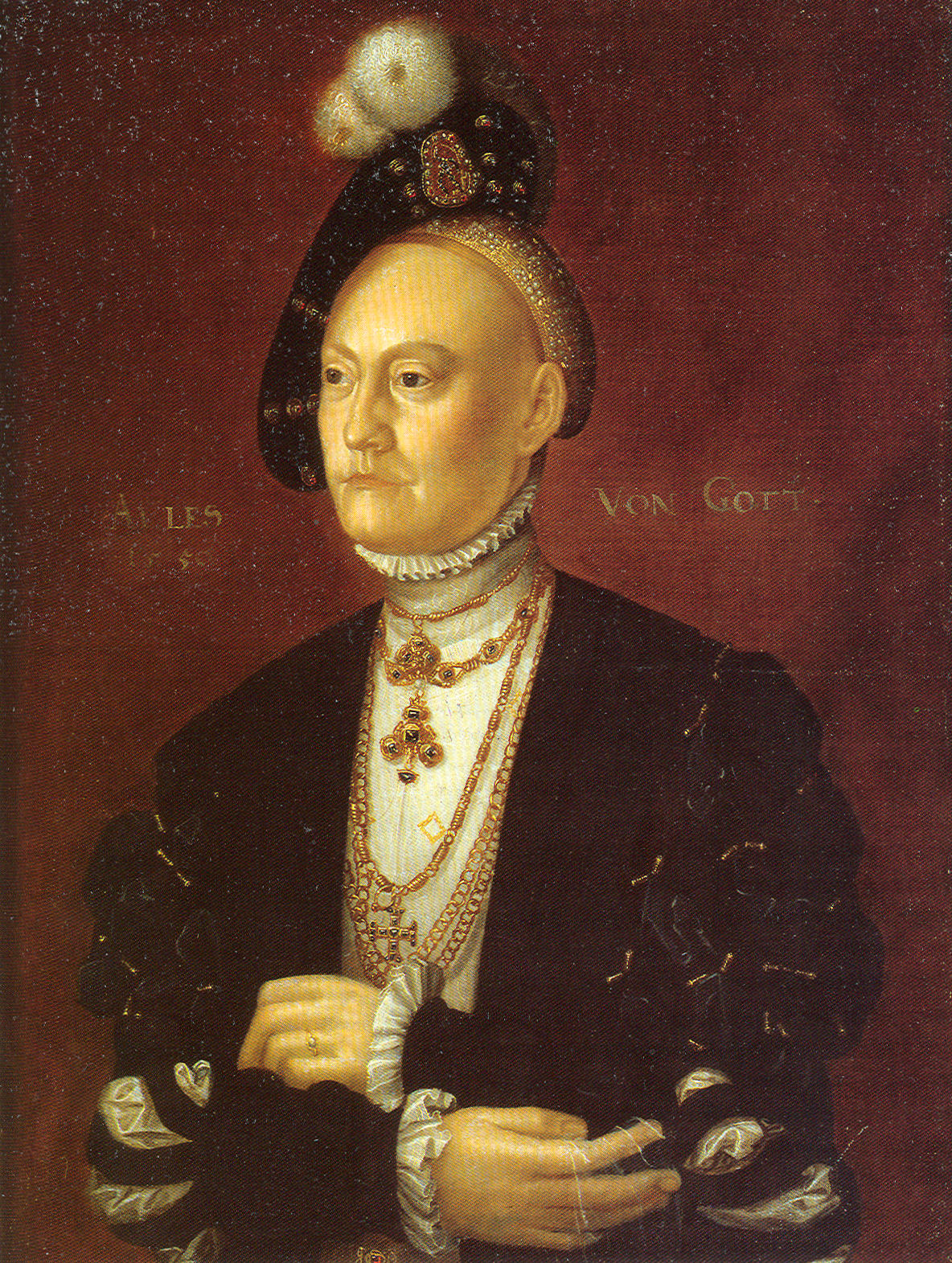
Dorothea of Saxe-Lauenburg

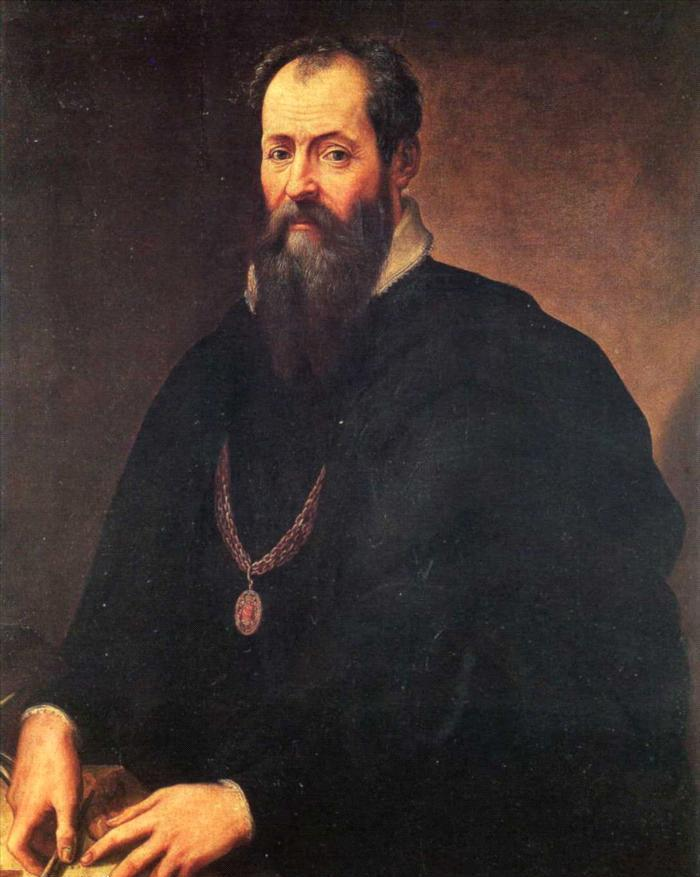
Giorgio Vasari

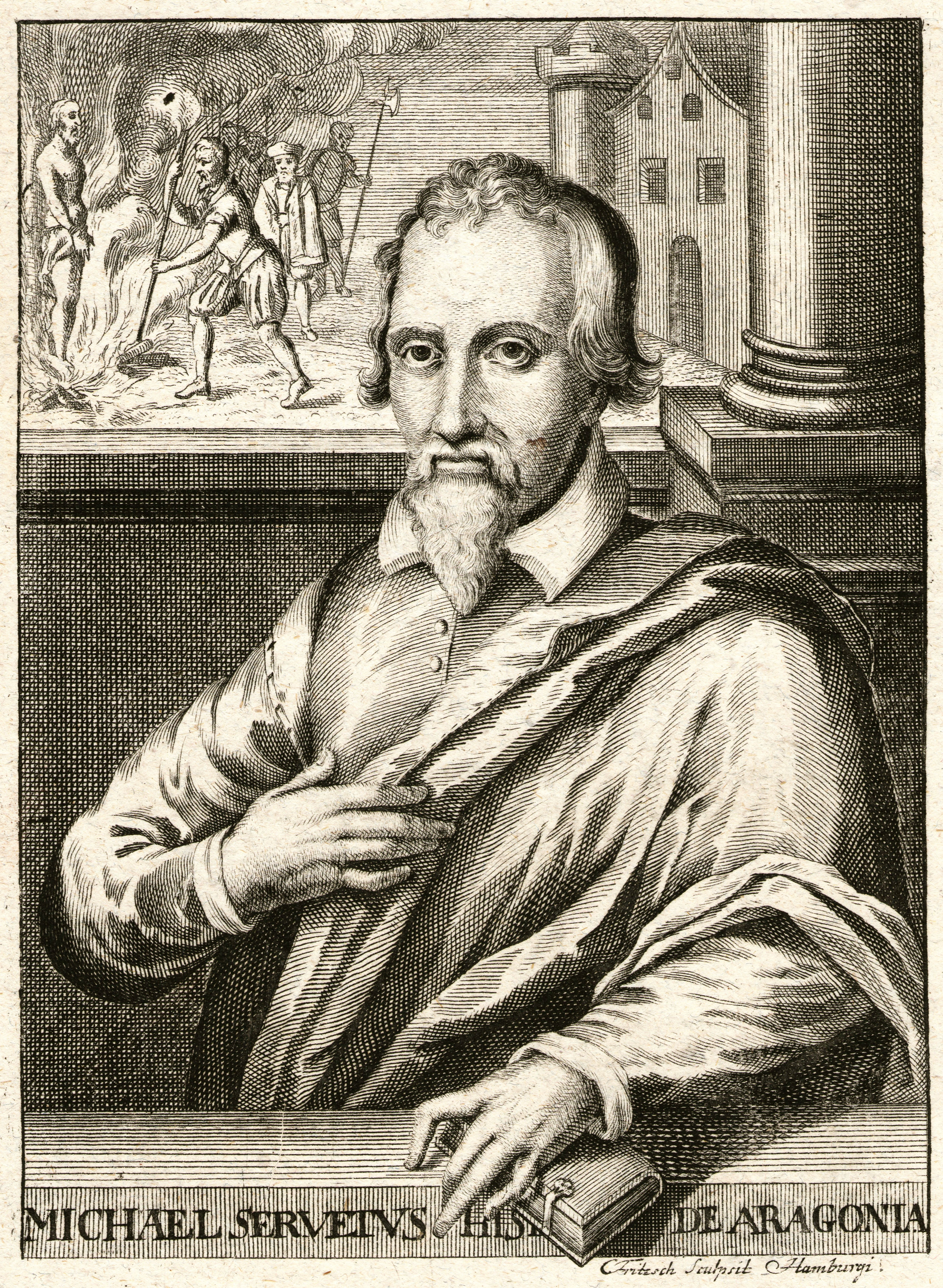
Michael Servetus

- January 1 – Henry, Duke of Cornwall, eldest son of Henry VIII of England
- April 2 – Ashikaga Yoshiharu, Japanese shōgun (d. 1550)
- April 5 – John III, Count of Nassau-Saarbrücken, German noble (d. 1574)
- June 4 – Honorat II of Savoy, French Navy admiral (d. 1580)
- June 6 – Jakob Schegk, German physician (d. 1587)
- June 18 – Bartolomeo Ammannati, Florentine architect and sculptor (d. 1592)
- July 9 – Dorothea of Saxe-Lauenburg, consort of Christian III from 1525, and Queen of Denmark and Norway (d. 1571)
- July 30 – Giorgio Vasari, Italian painter and architect (d. 1574)
- August 24 – Jean Bauhin, French physician (d. 1582)
- September 28 – Matsudaira Kiyoyasu, Japanese daimyo (d. 1535)
- September 29 – Michael Servetus, Spanish theologian (d. 1553)
- October 22 – Erasmus Reinhold, German astronomer and mathematician (d. 1553)
- November 8 – Paul Eber, German Lutheran theologian (d. 1569)
- November 15 – Johannes Secundus, Dutch poet (d. 1536)
- December 5 – Maldev Rathore, ruler of Marwar (d. 1562)
- Date Unknown
  - Amato Lusitano, Portuguese Jewish physician (d. 1568)
  - Birgitte Gøye, Danish county administrator, lady in waiting, landholder and educator (d. 1574)
  - Camillo Boccaccino, Italian painter (d. 1546)
  - Kimotsuki Kanetsugu, Japanese samurai and warlord (d. 1566)
  - Luís de Velasco, Spanish viceroy of New Spain (d. 1564)
  - Nicola Vicentino, Italian music theorist and composer (d. 1576)
  - Nicholas Bobadilla, one of the first Spanish Jesuits (d. 1590)
  - Pierre Viret, Swiss reformed theologian (d. 1571)
  - Gaspar Cervantes de Gaeta, Spanish cardinal (d. 1575)

== Deaths ==
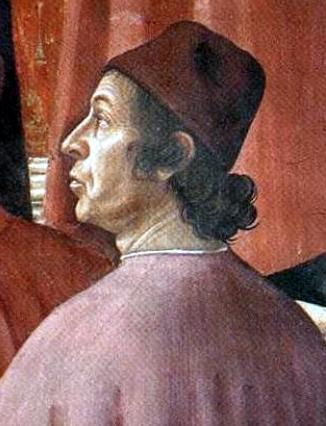
Demetrios Chalkokondyles

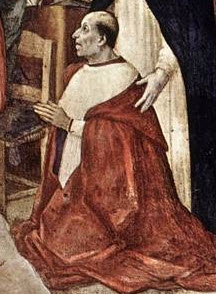
Oliviero Carafa

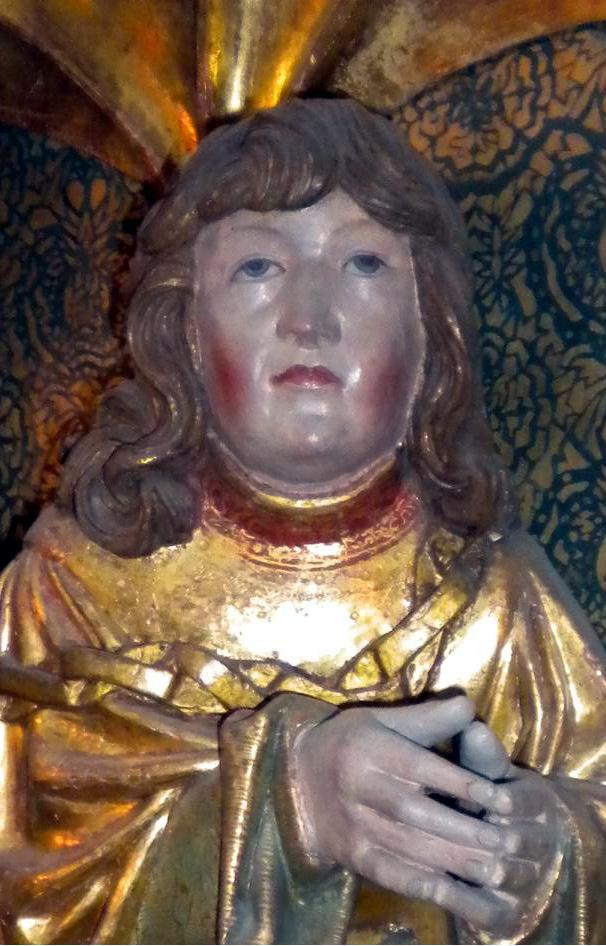
Francis of Denmark

- January 9 – Demetrios Chalkokondyles, Greek classical scholar (b. 1424)
- January 20 – Oliviero Carafa, Italian Catholic cardinal (b. 1430)
- February 22 – Henry, Duke of Cornwall, eldest son of Henry VIII of England
- April 1 – Francis of Denmark, Danish prince (b. 1497)
- April 2 – Bernard VII, Lord of Lippe, German nobleman (b. 1428)
- June 3 – Ahmad ibn Abi Jum'ah, North African Islamic scholar, author of the Oran fatwa
- June 13 – Hedwig, Abbess of Quedlinburg, Princess-Abbess of Quedlinburg (b. 1445)
- July 2 – Şahkulu, leader of the Şahkulu Rebellion
- July 6 – Adolf III of Nassau-Wiesbaden-Idstein, Germany noble (b. 1443)
- July 12 – Albert I, Duke of Münsterberg-Oels, Count of Kladsko (b. 1468)
- August 2 – Andrew Barton, Scottish naval leader (b. c. 1466)
- September 6
  - Ashikaga Yoshizumi, Japanese shogun (b. 1481)
  - William IV, Duke of Jülich-Berg, Count of Ravensberg (b. 1455)
- October 18 – Philippe de Commines, French-speaking Fleming in the courts of Burgundy and France (b. 1447)
- November 23
  - Mahmud Begada, Sultan of Gujarat (b. 1458)
  - Anne of York, daughter of King Edward IV of England (b. 1475)
- Date Unknown
  - Diego de Nicuesa, Spanish conquistador and explorer
  - Johannes Tinctoris, Flemish composer and music theorist (b. c. 1435)
  - Estefania Carròs i de Mur, Spanish educator (b. 1455)
  - Matthias Ringmann, German cartographer and humanist poet (b. 1482)
  - Yusuf Adil Shah, founding leader of the Adil Shahi Dynasty
- Probable – Antoine de Févin, French composer (b. c. 1470)
