= Şahkulu rebellion =

Uprising in against the Ottomans in 1511

- Part of Ottoman persecution of Alevis and Ottoman–Persian War (1505–1517)
Date	1511
Location	Teke Peninsula
Result	Ottoman victory; Rebellion suppressed

Belligerents
Qizilbash rebels Supported by: Safavid Iran	Ottoman Empire

Commanders and leaders
Şahkulu †	(Ottoman Empire) Bayezid II (Ottoman Empire) Şehzade Selim (Ottoman Empire) Şehzade Ahmed (Ottoman Empire) Hadım Ali Pasha † (Ottoman Empire) Karagöz Ahmed Pasha †

Strength
Unknown	4,000 janissaries; 4,000 kapıkulu

The Şahkulu rebellion was a widespread pro-Shia and pro-Safavid uprising in Anatolia, directed against the Ottoman Empire, in 1511. It began among the Turkmen tribes of the Taurus Mountains, before spreading to a wide variety of disgruntled groups. It is named after the leader of the rebels, Şahkulu. His death in battle also meant the end of the uprising.

== Background ==
The Safavid dynasty was consolidated and founded by Ismail I in the early 16th century. Ismail, being a champion of the Shia faith and partially a Turkmen, was also sympathetic to the Turkmen of the Ottoman Empire.

The Qizilbash, Anatolian adherents to the Safavid order, held a strong presence across Anatolia from the late 15th century to the mid-16th century and assumed a central role in the Şahkulu rebellion. In the decades preceding the events of the rebellion, due to the fluid religious character of the region, the primarily Sunni Ottoman state demonstrated a notable tolerance towards Shia Islam. However, beginning in the early 16th century, this tolerance began to recede; according to official Ottoman terminology from the period, a Qizilbash was a rebel heretic suspected of illicit ties to the Safavids. Some ascribe this receding tolerance to the decline of the Aq Qoyunlu coupled with the emerging socio-political legitimacy of the Safavid empire.

Though the revolt was incited by Şahkulu among the Qizilbash, among the eventual participants were also various non-Qizilbash groups, such as former sipahis, and dispossessed ghazis, and other Turkmen peoples. This decrease in tolerance contributed in part to the malcontent of the Turkmen tribes in Anatolia towards the Ottoman State. Their refusal to pay state taxes, settle down, and accept Ottoman central control pushed these Turkmen tribes towards a more militant form of Shi’ism. This same malcontent would lead to multiple uprisings in Eastern Anatolia headed by tribal leaders.

Being inspired by Safavid missionaries, the Turkmens living on Ottoman soil, "as far west as Konya", were mobilized in a "fervent messianic movement", led by Şahkulu. Şahkulu and his followers tried to "replicate" the same type of revolt led by Ismail I several years earlier, "perhaps in anticipation of a union with the Safavids". Ismail I's activities did not escape the attention of the Ottomans, but the Ottoman Empire was too preoccupied with the oncoming period of interregnum during the last years of the crippled sultan Bayezid II. Thus Ismail was able to gain many supporters among Ottoman subjects. One such supporter was Şahkulu (meaning "servant of the shah"), a member of the Turkmen Tekkelu tribe.

== Course of events ==
During the early days of interregnum, Korkut, one of the princes (Turkish: Şehzade), was travelling from Antalya to Manisa to be closer to the capital. Şahkulu raided his caravan and robbed the treasury. Then he began attacking the towns and killing the government officers there. He also raided Alaşehir to seize a part of the royal treasure. Only then was an Ottoman force under Karagöz Ahmet Pasha, the beylerbey of Anadolu, sent to check his activities. But Şahkulu defeated the forces of Ahmet Pasha and executed him. This increased the fame and the prestige of Şahkulu. To his partisans, after raiding a royal caravan and killing a high-ranking Ottoman statesman, he was invincible. A second army was sent after him. The commanders of the army were Şehzade Ahmet, one of the claimants to the throne, and the grand vizier Hadım Ali Pasha. They were able to corner Şahkulu near Altıntaş (in modern Kütahya Province), but instead of fighting, Ahmet tried to win over the janissaries for his cause. Failing to achieve this, he left the battlefield. Şahkulu saw his chance and escaped. Ali Pasha with a smaller force chased him, and clashed with him at Çubukova between Kayseri and Sivas.(according to some sources Gökçay) The battle was a draw, but both Ali Pasha and Şahkulu were killed (July 1511).

== Aftermath ==
Şahkulu's partisans were not defeated, but they had lost their leader. Many scattered, but after a third army was sent by the Ottoman Porte, the most devoted escaped to Persia. During their escape they raided a caravan, and accidentally killed a well-known Persian scholar. Consequently, instead of showing them hospitality, Ismail executed them. Meanwhile, in Ottoman lands, Prince Ahmet's behavior in the battle caused reaction among the soldiers. Moreover, the death of Hadım Ali, the chief partisan of Ahmet, provided an advantage to the youngest claimants to throne: the succession would ultimately fall to Selim I, under whose reign the Ottoman state saw spectacular victories and doubled in area. Selim was also a very devoted Sunni and effectively checked Shiite activities in Ottoman lands after defeating Ismail in the Battle of Chaldiran in 1514.

But the anxiety of the Ottomans, in relation to "losing much of their Asian possessions was not eased". Nor did the hatred of the Ottomans for Ismail I cease to exist, even though Ismail apologized for the atrocities caused by the Turkmens and "disowned" Şahkulu.

As the possibility existed of a "mass Turkmen exodus into the Safavid realm", Bayezid II sought to establish good relations with Ismail, "at least on the surface, and welcomed Ismail's gestures to establish good neighborly relations". In letters sent to Ismail, Bayezid II addressed Ismail as "heir to the kingdom of Kaykhosrow – the legendary great king of the Shahnameh – and to Dara (Darius) of the ancient Persian Empire". Abbas Amanat adds: "He further advised Ismail to behave royally, preserve his precious and strategically vital kingdom with justice and equanimity, end forced conversions, and leave in peace with his neighbors".

The political environment which resulted from this revolt would lead the next Ottoman Sultan, Selim I, to take violent measures against the Qizilbash and declare war on Iran. Counted among these violent measures was the decree from Selim I to kill more than 40,000 Qizilbash, children and elderly included, in Rumelia and Anatolia prior to the Battle of Chaldiran in March 1514. In undated letters from Selim I sent to Ismail I, estimated to have been written in 1514, Selim I wrote that "it has been heard repeatedly that you have subjected the upright community of Muhammad to your devious will" and expounded upon his plans to "crown the head of every gallows tree with a crown-wearing Sufi and clear the faction from the face of the earth".

== See also ==
- Rebellion of the false Ismail Mirza

== Sources ==
- Amanat, Abbas (2017). Iran: A Modern History. Yale University Press. ISBN 978-0300231465.
- McCaffrey, Michael J. (1990). "ČĀLDERĀN". Encyclopaedia Iranica, Vol. IV, Fasc. 6. pp. 656–658.
- Savory, Roger; Karamustafa, Ahmet T. (1998). "ESMĀʿĪL I ṢAFAWĪ". Encyclopaedia Iranica, Vol. VIII, Fasc. 6. pp. 628–636.
- Savory, Roger (2007). Iran Under the Safavids. Cambridge: Cambridge University Press. p. 40. ISBN 978-0521042512.
