= The Westminster Tournament Challenge =

Invitation to the 1511 Westminster Tournament

The Challenge
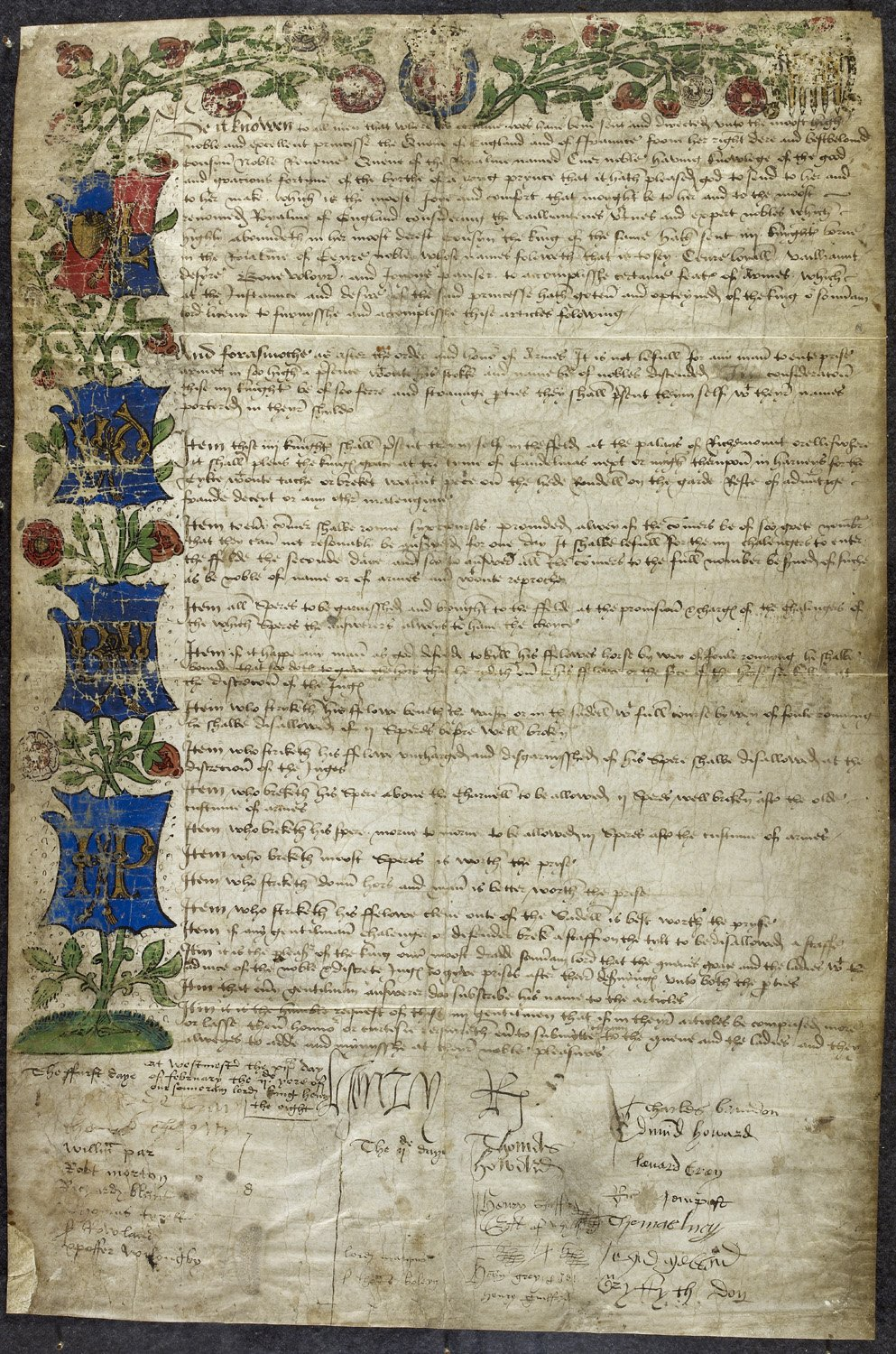
- Created: 1511
- Location: British Library
- Commissioned by: Henry VIII
- Author: Thomas Wriothesley
- Purpose: Invitation to 1511 Westminster Tournament

The Westminster Tournament Challenge was the invitation to the 1511 Westminster Tournament, a joust held on 12 and 13 February 1511 in honour of the birth of a son, Prince Henry, to Catherine of Aragon and Henry VIII on New Year's Day. The tournament is documented in chronicles, accounts of expenses, and the 1511 Westminster Tournament Roll commissioned as an illustrated record of the events.

== The Challenge manuscript ==
Written in the form of an allegory, The Challenge begins by introducing the four challengers who have come from the realm of Cuere Noble to "accomplish certain feates of Armes" in honour of the "byrthe of a yong prynce". Each challenger is given an allegorical name: Sir William Courtenay as Bone voloyr, Sir Edward Neville as Joyous panser, Sir Thomas Knyvet as Vailliaunt desyre, and Henry VIII as Cuere loyall. This is followed by a description of the tournament's allegorical theme along with the rules and regulations to which the challengers and answerers will adhere. It concludes with the signatures of those who took part over the two days of the joust.

The Challenge, was commissioned by Henry VIII and produced by the workshop of Thomas Wriothesley. It is on a single piece of parchment, measuring 460 mm x 354 mm, held in the manuscript collection of the British Library (Cart. Harl. Antiq. 83 H 1). It is written in the chancery hand style; Sydney Anglo has produced a complete transcription of The Challenge's text

Edward Hall's Chronicle mentions the challenge as a "goodly table" displayed at the tournament on an artificial tree. Henry Ellis first published the text in 1827.

== Signatures ==
The manuscript appears to have been displayed at the tournament and signed on two days. In the original spelling, for the first day: Henry R; Rychard de Gray; Thomas Cheyney; William Par; Robert Morton; Richard Blunt; Thomas Tyrell; Sir Rowland; Cristoffer Wyloughby (son of Christopher Willoughby, 10th Baron Willoughby de Eresby).

For the second day: Thomas Howard; Charles Brandon; Henry Stafford, erll of Whyllsyre; Lord Marquis; John Grey; Sir Thomas Boleyn; Henry Guildford; John Melton; Gryffyth Don; Edmund Howard; Leonard Graey; Ric. Tempest; Thomas Lucy.

== Costume and the royal initials ==
Fabrics and costume featured the royal initials, "H" and "K". The costumes of some of these participants were described in Hall's Chronicle. The Marquess of Dorset and Sir Thomas Boleyn wore emblems of pilgrimage to Santiago de Compostela. The Earl of Wiltshire wore cloth of silver and brought a tree of pomegranates, an emblem of Catherine of Aragon.

During the tournament, Catherine of Aragon may have distributed gold tokens with the initials "H.K" to event winners. A heart-shaped gold pendant locket enamelled with the royal initials and her pomegranate device discovered in 2019 may have been an object of this type.

== Artificial forest ==
The setting of a masque at the tournament banquet was La Forrest Salvigne. The King and his companions in disguise, six men and six ladies made their entry into Westminster Hall in a pageant car (previously concealed behind tapestry) drawn by wildmen decorated as an artificial forest. The women wore elaborate headresses and white and green satin costumes embroidered with the letters "H.K", and the men were dressed in purple satin liberally embroidered with gold and spangles and their tournament alias names. The forest was "planted" with hawthorns, oaks, hazels, maple, birch, and fern, and strewn with hand-made acorns and hazelnuts. There were modelled deer and rabbits, and a golden castle inhabited by a waving maiden. The masquers descended from the car and danced. Some details were recorded in an account book made by Richard Gibson, a yeoman of the revels. It was intended that Henry and the masked dancers would exit in the pageant car at the end of the dance, but was stripped of its decoration by members of the audience. Later, only the bare timber could be salvaged for re-use.
