= Henry, Duke of Cornwall =

Heir apparent of Henry VIII (1511)

Henry
- Duke of Cornwall
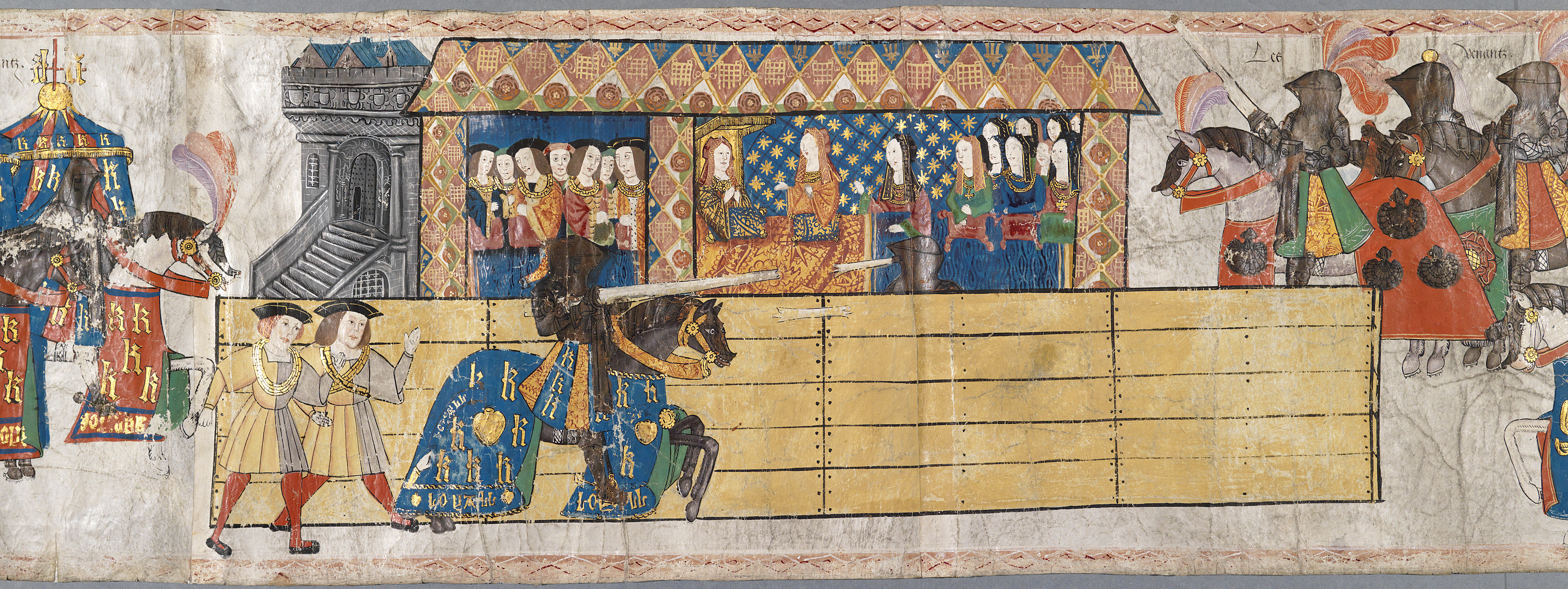
- The Westminster roll, celebrating Henry's birth
- Born: 1 January 1511; Richmond Palace, Surrey, England
- Died: 22 February 1511 (aged 52 days); Richmond Palace, Surrey, England
- Burial: 27 February 1511; Westminster Abbey, London
- House: Tudor
- Father: Henry VIII
- Mother: Catherine of Aragon

Henry, Duke of Cornwall (1 January 1511 – 22 February 1511) was the first living child of King Henry VIII of England and his first wife, Catherine of Aragon, and though his birth was celebrated as that of the heir apparent, he died within weeks. His death and the failure of Henry VIII and Catherine to produce another surviving male heir led to succession and marriage crises that affected the relationship between the English Church and the Papacy, giving rise to the English Reformation.

== Birth and christening ==
Henry was born on 1 January 1511 at Richmond Palace, the first live-born child of King Henry VIII and Catherine of Aragon, born eighteen months after their wedding and coronation. Catherine had previously given birth to a stillborn daughter, on 31 January 1510. He was christened on 5 January in a lavish ceremony where beacons were lit in his honour. The christening gifts included a fine gold salt holder and cup weighing a total 99 ozt (3.1 kg), given by Louis XII of France, his godfather. His godmother was Margaret of Austria, Duchess of Savoy. Appearing as proxy for the French King was Richard Foxe, Bishop of Winchester, while the proxy for the Duchess of Savoy was Lady Anne Howard, daughter of Edward IV and the King's maternal aunt. Henry was placed in the care of Elizabeth Denton, who had been his father's own former governess.

== Celebrations and the Great Tournament ==
Henry VIII and his queen planned extravagant celebrations rivalling that of their joint coronation for the birth of their son, who automatically became Duke of Cornwall and heir apparent to the English throne, and was expected to become Prince of Wales, King of England, Lord of Ireland and third king of the House of Tudor. The most lavish tournament of Henry's reign was held at Westminster Palace on the 12 and 13 February 1511. The illuminated manuscript challenge survives, signed by the main participants. The events of the second day were memorialised by a long illuminated vellum roll, known as The Westminster Tournament Roll. The roll is now to be found in the College of Arms collection, and its depictions include the trumpeter John Blanke.

Jousting at Westminster took place on a tournament ground, or tiltyard, located just beyond the north door of Westminster Abbey. The 1511 event cost around £4,400 (equivalent to £4,782,256 in 2025). The roll depicts the procession to the "lists", Henry VIII tilting with a grandstand or viewing gallery of spectatators, and the exit procession. The chronicle writer Edward Hall described the pageants and masques. Fabrics and costume featured the royal initials, "H" and "K".

The theme of the event, as was customary, was a fictional invitation or challenge. Queen Noble Renown of Coeur Noble had heard news of the birth of the English prince. She sent her four best knights to Westminster; Coeur Loyall (played by Henry VIII), Valiant Desire (Thomas Knyvett), Bone Voloyr (Good Will, William Courtenay), and Joyous Panser (Joyful Thought, Edward Neville). Charles Brandon led the challengers. The pageants on the first day included a castle in a forest drawn into the tiltyard by a lion and an antelope led by wildmen. The four knights of Queen Noble Renown emerged from the castle to salute Catherine of Aragon.

== Death ==
The Duke of Cornwall died on 22 February 1511, aged 52 days, at Richmond Palace, and was buried in Westminster Abbey.

Henry VIII gave Elizabeth Poyntz, his nurse, a pension of £20 (equivalent to £21,738 in 2025) for life. Her identity is uncertain, and it has been suggested that she was a member of the Poyntz family of Iron Acton, Gloucestershire, possibly Elizabeth, daughter of William Huddesfield, the first wife of Anthony Poyntz, or a woman of an earlier generation.

Henry, Duke of Cornwall House of Tudor Born: 1 January 1511 Died: 22 February 1511
Peerage of England
Vacant Title last held by Henry VIII	Duke of Cornwall; 1 January – 22 February 1511	Vacant Title next held by Edward VI
