= 1511 Westminster Tournament Roll =

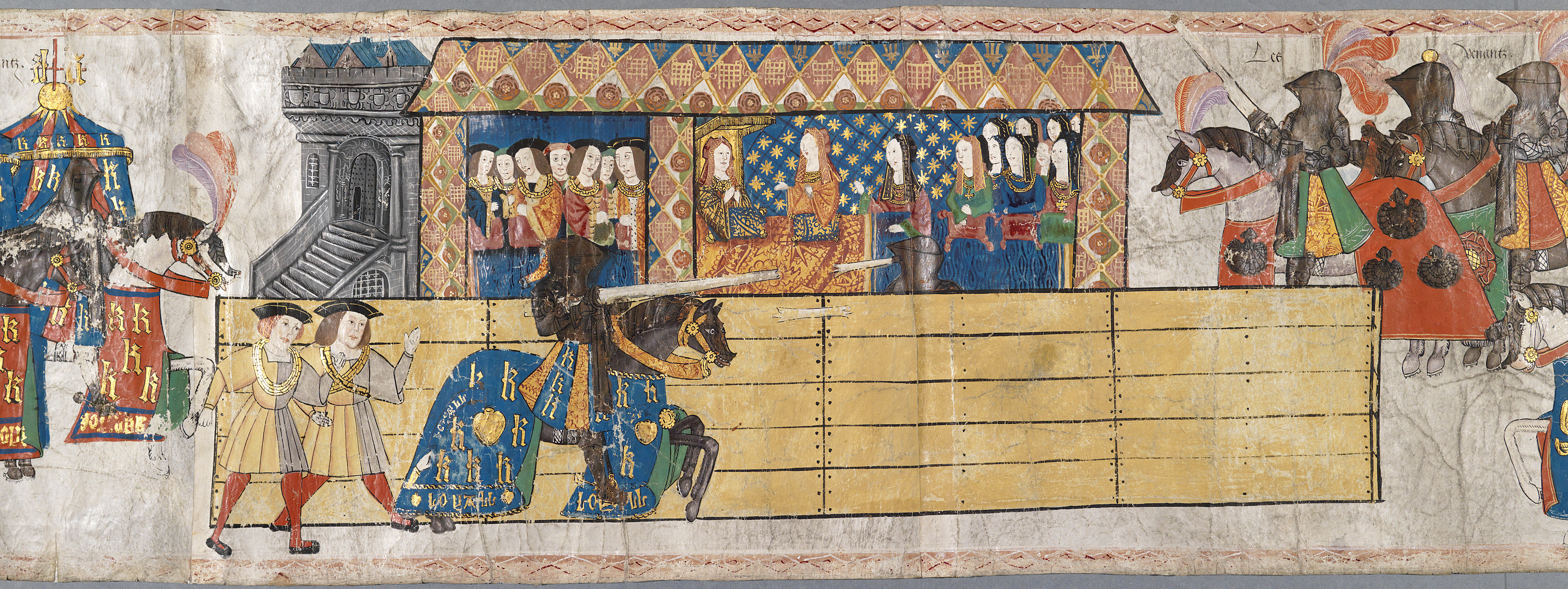
- Detail showing Henry VIII tilting in front of Katherine of Aragon
- Created: 1511
- Location: College of Arms
- Purpose: To commemorate of the birth of King Henry VIII's son born New Year's Day 1511

The 1511 Westminster Tournament Roll is a painted roll of 36 vellum membranes sewn together. It is almost 60 feet long and 14 3/4 inches wide. The Roll depicts the joust called by Henry VIII in February 1511 to celebrate the birth of his son, Henry, Duke of Cornwall, to Catherine of Aragon, on New Year's Day of that year.

Dale Hoak, in his book Tudor Political Culture, describes the Roll as follows:

The [illuminated roll] preserves a unique visual record of the politico-cultural purposes of the Tudor tournament as spectacle: here is the staged, chivalric magnificence of young Henry's court, an orchestrated magnificence meant to rival that of the Burgundian court from which the forms of such martial pageantry were derived.

The Roll is one of the most ancient and most prized possessions of the College of Arms in London. It is believed to be the work of Thomas Wriothesley's workshop, as is The Westminster Tournament Challenge, which was the invitation to the Tournament. That document is in the British Library's collections. The Roll features the earliest known portrait of a named Black person in Britain, John Blanke. He is pictured twice on the roll, playing the trumpet in both the opening and closing ceremonies of the tournament.

== Contents ==
=== Membrane 1 The Introduction ===
An heraldic badge signifying the unity of Henry VIII and Catherine of Aragon.

=== Membrane 2 to 23 The Beginning of the Day ===
A procession led by the master of the King's Armourer and his Mace-bearer followed by six trumpeters, including the black trumpeter John Blanke, mentioned in John Heron's accounts. There follow sixteen gentleman leading the allegorical pageant of the four challengers: Sir Edward Neville as Joyeulx Penser, Sir William Courtenay as Bon Vouloir, Sir Thomas Knyvet as Vaillant desyr and ending with Henry VIII as Cueur Loyal. Each challenger is shepherded by a number of footman with the king having the most.

=== Membrane 24 to 27 The Joust ===
The jousting scene, with the Challengers at one end and the Answerers at the other, depicts Henry's joust, just as he shatters his lance on his opponent's helmet, in doing so scoring the highest points. The King's joust is shown as watched over by Queen Katherine along with ladies and gentlemen of the court seated in an ornate pavilion.

=== Membrane 27 to 35 The End of the Day ===
The procession is depicted returning from The Joust, closing with the King in all his finery, surrounded by several footmen, as he is shown passing the Queen in the pavilion.

=== Membrane 36 The Conclusion ===
A closing heraldic device and a poem of five verses in praise of Henry VIII, including the lines:

This art owr hope our ankyr haven and port
In which we sayle now sure from sorows darke
By harry our kyng the flowr of natewrs werk

Some idea of the scale of the pageantry depicted in the Roll can be seen from Allen Guttman's statement:

If the Olympic Games were to have the same proportion of pageantry of athletics, we might expect a week of opening ceremonies, followed by two days of sports and another week of closing ceremonies.

== Reproductions ==
There is a collotype reproduction by Sydney Anglo: The Great Tournament Roll of Westminster published in 1968, which was made possible by support of the Marc Fitch Fund. There is also a series of engravings of the Roll made in 1747 for the Vetusta Monumenta: this is held by the Society of Antiquaries in London. Digital photographs are held at the College of Arms.

== Television appearances and radio broadcasts ==
The Roll appeared in David Olusoga's series for BBC Two, Black and British: A Forgotten History, first broadcast 9 November 2016. It also appeared in the first episode of Six Wives with Lucy Worsley, broadcast on BBC One on 7 December 2016. It is described in Julian Joseph's BBC Radio 4 programme, The Trumpet Shall Sound.

== Public display ==
In May 2022 an exhibition The Tudors: Passion, Power and Politics at the Walker Art Gallery in Liverpool displayed the Westminster Tournament Roll in public for the first time in 20 years. It was first time the document was shown outside London.
