= Robert Knecht =

British historian (1926–2023)

Robert Jean Knecht (20 September 1926 – 4 November 2023) was a British historian, an expert on 16th-century France, and Emeritus Professor of French history at the University of Birmingham, where he taught during 1956–1994.

== Biography ==
The only child of French parents living in London, Knecht was educated at the French Lycée in London and the Salesian College, Farnborough. He graduated at King's College London in 1948 and qualified as a teacher in 1949. In 1953 he was awarded the M.A. degree of London University for which he submitted a thesis on Cardinal John Morton and his episcopal colleagues. Knecht was then employed by a firm of industrial designers to collect and exhibit old prints and to write explanatory booklets for three theme pubs in London. In 1954 he carried out research on MPs in the Cinque Ports for the early Tudor volume of the History of Parliament and wrote the chapter on schools in Salisbury during the 19th century for the Victoria County History. Though trained as a medieval historian, he was appointed in 1956 as assistant-lecturer in early modern history at the University of Birmingham where he chose to remain for the rest of his professional career. In 1984 he was awarded the degree of D.Litt. (Birmingham). His earliest book was The Voyage of Sir Nicholas Carewe published in 1959 by Cambridge University Press for the Roxburghe Club.

In the 1950s Knecht travelled widely in Europe, often cycling, as tour leader for the Students' International Travel Association, based in the U.S. and the Ramblers' Association. In 1970 he turned his attention to French history in the sixteenth century and began research on the reign of the French king Francis I, producing the first serious work in English on that king in 1982. This he revised completely for the king's 500th anniversary in 1994. Since then he has published some twenty books on early modern French history.

In 1977 Knecht formed a close association with a group of French art historians led by André Chastel and Jean Guillaume, taking part in several of their summer schools. In May 1994 he was Visiting Fellow of the Ecole des Hautes Etudes en Sciences Sociales in Paris. In 2001 he became a Chevalier de l'Ordre des Palmes académiques promoted to the rank of Officer in August 2010. He was a Fellow of the Royal Historical Society, an elected member of the Société de l'Histoire de France and was a co-founder and former chairman of the Society for the Study of French History (1994–97) and of the Society for Renaissance Studies (1989–92).

Knecht's 2008 book, The French Renaissance Court, has been awarded the Enid McLeod Prize of the Franco-British Society for 2009. His recreations were listening to classical music, visiting art galleries and historic houses, architecture, travel and photography.

Knecht died on 4 November 2023, at the age of 97.

== List of publications ==
- 1959: The Voyage of Sir Nicolas Carewe to the Emperor Charles V in the year 1529, edited from the British Museum manuscript (Egerton 3315, by Thomas Wall) with introduction and notes by R. J. Knecht. Cambridge: Printed for the Roxburghe Club at the University Press. 116 pages. OCLC 224086371, 19875083.
- 1969: Francis I and Absolute Monarchy. London: Historical Association. 31 pages. OCLC 906044219. ISBN 9780852780145.
- 1975: The Fronde. London: Historical Association. 30 pages. OCLC 2750536.
  - 1986: The Fronde, revised edition. London: Historical Association. 33 pages. OCLC 13549459.
- 1982: Francis I. London; New York; Melbourne: Cambridge University Press. 480 pages. OCLC 465753318. ISBN 9780521243445.
- 1984: French Renaissance Monarchy: Francis I and Henry II. London: Longman. 123 pages. OCLC 1154283216. ISBN 9780582353749. 8th impression, 1995: OCLC 473967939.
  - 1996: French Renaissance Monarchy: Francis I and Henry II, second edition. London; New York: Longman. 145 pages. OCLC 468010656. ISBN 9780582287075.
- 1989: The French Wars of Religion, 1559–1599. London; New York: Longman. 153 pages. OCLC 883372530. ISBN 9780582354562. Online: Milton: Taylor & Francis, 3rd edition, 2010, 209 pages, OCLC 1024280683. Online: Routledge, 2014, OCLC 8162336543.
- 1991: Richelieu. London; New York: Longman. 259 pages. OCLC 750861707. ISBN 9780582080157.
- 1994: Renaissance Warrior and Patron: The Reign of Francis I [expanded and revised version of Francis I]. Cambridge; New York: Cambridge University Press. 612 pages. OCLC 1126377219, 1010857727. ISBN 9780582082410, 9780521417969, 9780521578851.
  - 1998: Un prince de la Renaissance. François Ier et son royaume, translated into French by Patrick Hersant. Paris: Fayard. OCLC 39916716, 301597719. ISBN 9782213600857, 9782213600857.
- 1996: The Rise and Fall of Renaissance France, 1483–1610. London: Fontana. 668 pages. OCLC 489580100. ISBN 9780002556798.
  - 2001: The Rise and Fall of Renaissance France, 1483–1610, second edition. Oxford; Malden, MA: Blackwell. 591 pages. OCLC 847460847. ISBN 9780631227298.
- 1997: Catherine de' Medici. Harlow: Addison Wesley Longman Higher Education. 340 pages. OCLC 60165232, 185366911. London; New York: Longman, 1998. 340 pages. OCLC 906746333. ISBN 9780582082410, 9780582082427.
  - 2003: Catherine De Médicis (1519–1589), translated into French by Sarah Leclerq. Brussels: Le Cri. 346 pages. OCLC 57689618. ISBN 9782871063179.
- 2000: The French Civil Wars, 1562–1598. Harlow: Longman. 341 pages. OCLC 469411054. ISBN 9780582095489.
- 2002: The French Religious Wars, 1562–1598. Oxford: Osprey Publishing Limited. 95 pages. OCLC 473541616. ISBN 9781841763958.
- 2004: The Valois: Kings of France 1328–1589. London: Bloomsbury Academic. 276 pages. OCLC 8164197264. ISBN 9781474210362. Online (restricted access).
  - 2007: The Valois: Kings of France 1328–1589, second edition. London: Hambledon Continuum. 276 pages. OCLC 718638424. ISBN 9781852855222.
- 2008: The French Renaissance Court, 1483–1589, New Haven; London: Yale University Press. 415 pages. OCLC 470736537. ISBN 9780300118513.
- 2014: Hero or Tyrant? Henry III, King of France, 1574–89, Ashgate, OCLC 875631827. ISBN 9781472429322, 147242932X. London: Routledge, 2016. 356 pages. OCLC 1006078033. ISBN 9781472429308.
