= Society for Renaissance Studies =

The Society for Renaissance Studies is an academic society whose aim is to provide an interdisciplinary forum for all those interested in studying the Renaissance in the UK and Ireland. It pursues this though organising a wide range of activities, allocating funding for research, and supporting publications, including a book series and Renaissance Studies (ISSN 0269-1213), a flagship journal for the field.

The society was formed in 1967, the founding meeting held at the Institute of Historical Research on 12 July of that year. This meeting was chaired by the noted historian Denys Hay and amongst those participating were the art historians Ernst Gombrich and Kenneth Clark and the historian Sydney Anglo, the society's first secretary.

== Chairs ==
The past and current chairs of the society include the following:

- 1967-1970 Peter Murray
- 1970-1973 Nicolai Rubinstein
- 1973-1976 John Hale
- 1976-1980 Margaret Mann Phillips
- 1980-1983 Dominic Baker-Smith
- 1983-1986 Peter Burke
- 1986-1989 Sydney Anglo
- 1989-1992 Robert Knecht
- 1992-1995 Susan Foister
- 1995-1998 Francis Ames-Lewis
- 1998-2001 Gordon Campbell
- 2001-2004 David Chambers
- 2004-2007 Brian Vickers
- 2007-2010 John Law
- 2010-2013 Judith Bryce
- 2013-2016: Peter Mack
- 2016-2019: Andrew Hadfield
- 2019-2022: Richard Wistreich
- 2022-2025: Jane Grogan
- 2025-2028: Hannah Murphy
