= Margaret M. McGowan =

British historian of dance and France (1931–2022)

- Born: Margaret Mary McGowan; 21 December 1931; Deeping St James, Lincolnshire, England
- Died: 16 March 2022 (aged 90); Brighton, England
- Spouse: Sydney Anglo (m. 1964)

Academic background
- Education: Warburg Institute, London
- Thesis: L'art du Ballet de Cour en France, 1581–1643
- Doctoral advisor: Frances Yates
- Influences: D. P. Walker

Academic work
- Discipline: Performing arts history
- Sub-discipline: European Renaissance dance
- Institutions: University of Strasbourg, University of Glasgow, University of Sussex

Margaret Mary McGowan CBE (21 December 1931 – 16 March 2022) was a British dance historian and historian of early modern France. Her work was mainly focused on the late Renaissance and the fin-de-siècle period at the end of the nineteenth century. She was a chevalier of the Ordre des Arts et Lettres (2020), a winner of the Wolfson History Prize (2009), a member of the British Academy and an emerita research professor at the University of Sussex.

== Early life ==
McGowan was born in Deeping St James, Lincolnshire, on 21 December 1931. She was the third of four children of George McGowan and his wife Elizabeth McGrail. She attended Stamford High School and went to the University of Reading to study French. In 1957 she met Sydney Anglo, an academic, whom she married in 1964.

== Career ==
McGowan did her doctoral dissertation at the Warburg Institute of the University of London under the supervision of Frances Yates, published subsequently as L'art du Ballet de Cour en France, 1581–1643.

McGowan's first academic job was in the faculty of the University of Strasbourg. Between 1957 and 1964, she worked at the University of Glasgow, after which she joined the University of Sussex at Brighton, becoming professor of French in 1974. Between 1992 and 1997, she was pro-vice chancellor of the university. She retired in 1997 but continued as a research professor.

She was one of the first scholars to focus on the history of dance in the early modern period. She was one of the founders of the Society for Dance Research, and served as assistant editor for the journal Dance Research for several decades, helping to shape the field of early dance studies. In addition to nearly a dozen books, she published over eighty articles and book chapters.

=== Research ===
McGowan's first book, published in 1963, was her doctoral dissertation. It was especially well-received in France, with reviewers citing her pioneering evaluation of the political context of dance, with ballet in particular demonstrated as a politically driven artform.

The interdisciplinary nature of her work, combining art history, musicology, theatre and Renaissance history, was recognised by her peers, in particular Jean Jacquot, who invited her to present at Paris conferences. In contrast, however, to modern analyses of dance that incorporate frameworks and terminology of French theorists such as Michel Foucault, McGowan averred that Renaissance dance, where an individual's performance took precedence over that of the group, could not be interrogated under modern critical theory.

McGowan did not only produce analyses of dance; her researches into French poetry were also lauded. For example, her book Ideal Forms in the Age of Ronsard (1985), situated French literature in the political and moral climate. The poetry of Ronsard is seen to be praise poetry, a genre perhaps unfamiliar to modern readers, and therefore requiring knowledge of Renaissance conventions. Praise poetry was not only laudatory but also a medium of instruction in proper behaviour made palatable to the aristocracy. Along with visual idealisation as rendered by portraiture, court patronage demanded poetic idealisation as well. McGowan's coverage of the rivalries between poetry and art was extensive but critiqued for its nonlinearity, making it difficult to see how Ronsard's career was affected by it.

In 2008, McGowan's Dance in the Renaissance: European Fashion, French Obsession was published and garnered the 2009 Wolfson History Prize. This extended her thesis with the latest discoveries in French dance history, juxtaposing the courtly Valois performance art with contemporaneous popular genres. Her deep understanding of the archival material was appreciated, as was the presentation of textual material along with scenic and costume drawings. Especially useful was her detailed analysis of the finances, schedules and rehearsals of ballet production. She was criticised for not engaging, however, with competing researches. For instance, her assessment of Catherine de' Medici as only a dance enthusiast had been subsequently overturned by other scholars who now view her as a prime mover of ballet. Other reviewers pointed out inaccuracies in her rendition of historic names, misunderstandings of source texts, particularly from the Italian, and inaccurate generalisations on the evolution of dance styles.

McGowan's 2012 book, La Danse à la Renaissance, analysed sixteenth and seventeenth century dance in France via contemporary art and documents and synthesised the works of French and other specialists of social and political thought, combined with her own primary researches. The book was appreciated for its detailed connections between intellectual happenings and the creations of choreographers and performers as portrayed at the time.

After retirement, McGowan continued her researches. Her last book Festival and Violence was published in 2019, on European Renaissance festivals and their mixing of war and art. Before her death she finished Harmony in the Universe, discussing the search for peace via these fêtes.

== Later life and death ==
McGowan was appointed Commander of the Most Excellent Order of the British Empire (CBE) in the 1998 New Year Honours. In 2020, she was made a Chevalier de l'Ordre des Arts et Lettres.

McGowan died at a hospital in Brighton, on 16 March 2022, aged 90. She suffered from bladder cancer prior to her death.

== Publications ==
- L'art du Ballet de Cour en France, 1581–1643. Paris, 1963.
- Les fêtes de cour en Savoie: L'Oeuvre de Philippe d'Aglié. Société de l'Histoire de Théâtre, 1970.
- Montaigne's Deceits. London, 1974, ISBN 9780877220619
- L'entrée de Henri II à Rouen, 1550. Amsterdam, Theatrum Orbis Terrarum, 1974, ISBN 9780384348028
- Balet Comique de la Reyne, 1581. Medieval and Renaissance Texts, Binghamton, 1982, ISBN 9780866980128
- Form and Meaning: Aesthetic Coherence in Seventeenth-century French Drama, ed. with Ian D. McFarlane. Avebury, 1982, ISBN 9780861272167
- Ideal Forms in the Age of Ronsard. California University Press, 1985.
- Moy qui me voy: the Writer and the Self from Montaigne to Leiris, ed. with G. Craig. Oxford University Press, 1989, ISBN 978-0-198-15153-1.
- The Court Ballet of Louis XIII. London, Victoria & Albert Museum, 1989.
- The Vision of Rome in the French Renaissance. Yale University Press, 2000, ISBN 978-0-300-08535-8.
- Dance in the Renaissance: European Fashion, French Obsession. Yale University Press, 2008, ISBN 978-0-300-11557-4.
- La Danse à la Renaissance. Sources livresques et albums d'images. National Library of France, 2012, ISBN 978-2-717-72516-2
- Dynastic Marriages 1612/1615: A Celebration of the Habsburg and Bourbon Unions. Ashgate Publishing Ltd., 2013, ISBN 978-1-472-40490-9
- Festival and Violence: Princely Entries in the Context of War, 1480–1635, 2019, Brepols, ISBN 978-2-503-58333-4.
