= Teke Peninsula =

Geographical region of Turkey

Coordinates: 36°37′N 29°51′E

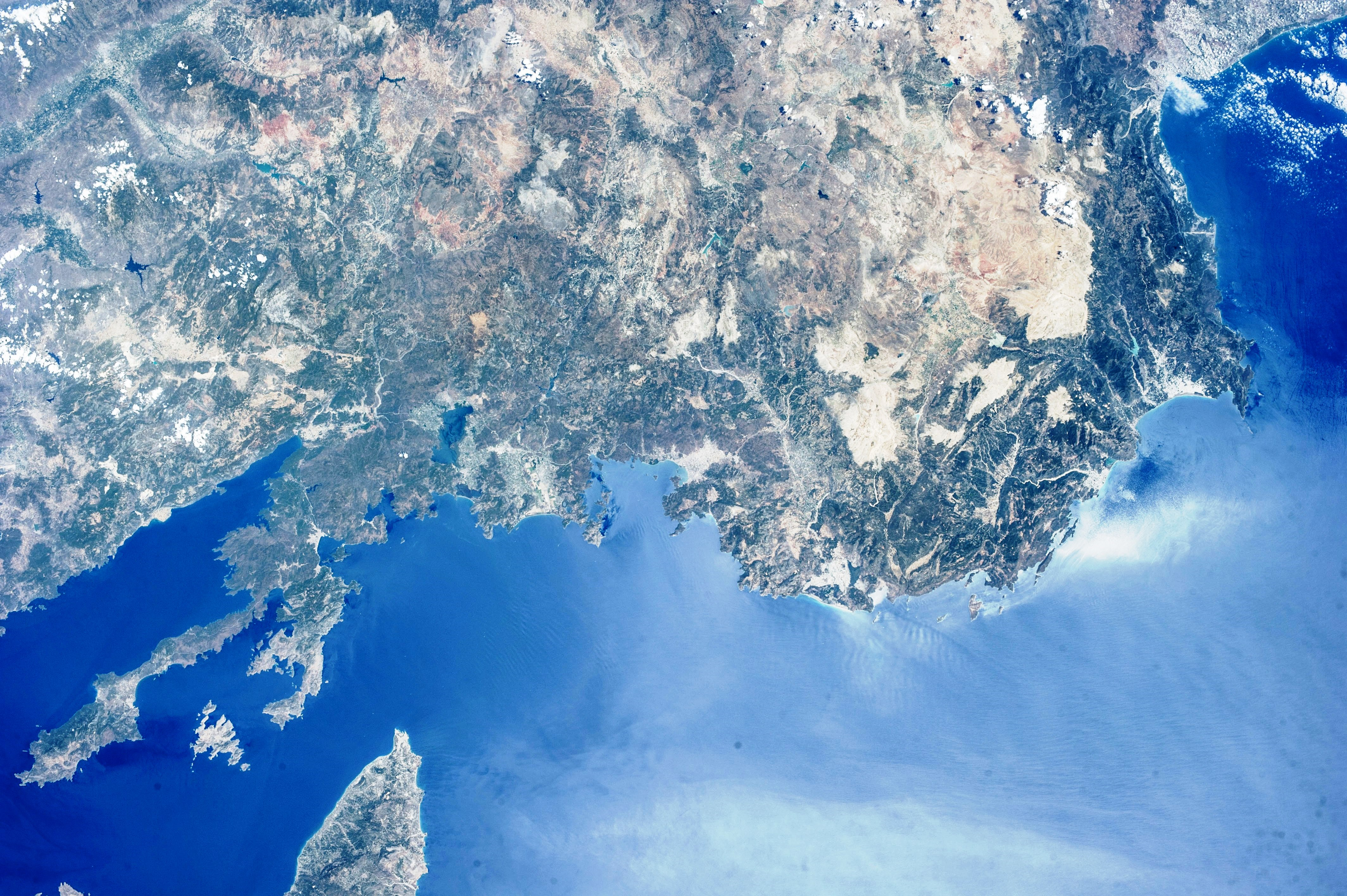
Satellite image of Teke Peninsula.

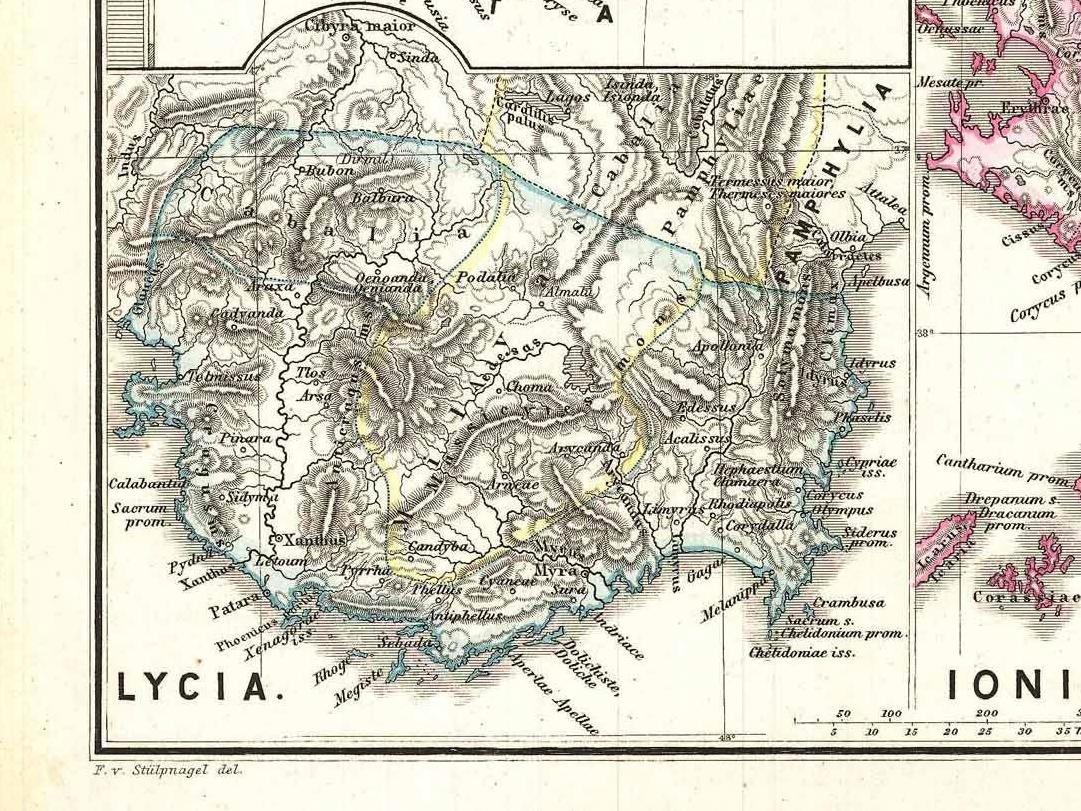
Map of Teke Peninsula showing the settlements of the Antiquity.

Teke Peninsula (Turkish: Teke Yarımadası), also known as Teke Region (Turkish: Teke Yöresi), is a peninsula located in southwestern Turkey between the gulfs of Antalya and Fethiye extending into the Mediterranean Sea. It is bordered to the Turkish Lakes Region in the north.

It was known as Lycia in ancient times. Its name comes from the Teke, a Turkmen tribe that settled in the region during the Sultanate of Rum.

The main streams of the region are Alakır Creek in the east and Eşen Creek in the west.

Remains of ancient cities in the region include Phaselis, Olympos, Arycanda, Myra, Xanthos, Letoon, Patara, Limyra. Settlements such as Kemer, Elmalı, Kumluca, Finike, Demre (formerly: Kale), Kaş, Kalkan, Kınık are also important for tourism. Mount Güllük-Termessos National Park and Beydağları Coastal National Park are located on the peninsula.

During the early sixteenth century, many Shiite Muslims were deported by the Ottoman Empire to Teke. In 1511, many of those rose up in the Şahkulu rebellion against the Ottomans under the leadership of Şahkulu in 1511.

== See also ==
- Lycian Way, 555 km (345 mi)-long hiking trail stretching from Hisarönü (Ovacık, Fethiye), Muğla Province in the west to Geyikbayırı, Konyaaltı, Antalya Province in the east
