= Rebellion of the false Ismail Mirza =

Rebellion of the false Ismail Mirza or Rebellion of the false Shah Ismail - also known as the False Ismail Mirza uprising, began in 1578 in the regions of Marash and Bozok by a person who proclaimed himself as II Shah Ismail against Ottoman rule. After the death of Safavid ruler II Shah Ismail, pseudo-Shah Ismails emerged not only within the Safavid territories but also in the Marash and Central Anatolian regions that came under the Ottoman Empire.

Before the protests of the False Shah Ismail and his supporters could escalate into a major uprising, they were suppressed by Ottoman soldiers, resulting in the deaths of many Qizilbash Turkmens, and many others fleeing and losing track of them in the process.

== The leader of the rebellion ==
There is not enough information available in sources about the leader of the uprising. According to a document in the Ottoman archives with the number MD 35-445, it is mentioned that he came from the province of Ajam to Anatolia and started the uprising there. There is no precise information about whether this Ajam territory refers to Arabia or Safavid territories. However, the description of his appearance in the document as "medium height, blond, and with a short beard, speaking Persian" increases the likelihood that the mentioned Ajam territory was part of the Safavid state. On the other hand, his being from the Sham Bayadi Turkmen, living a semi-nomadic life in regions such as Raqqa, Konya, Sivas, Nigde, Adana, Aleppo, Tarsus, Bozok, Marash, and Qaraman, and not leaving Anatolia since the mid-16th century, decreases the possibility of him coming from the Safavid state.

Moreover, the information obtained about the false Shah Ismail generally relates to his characteristics and reflects the Ottoman authority's view of him. For example, in the documents, terms such as "extremist claiming to be Shah Ismail and his followers" or "unfortunate individuals appearing in the name of Shah Ismail" are used. He and his followers are described as troublemakers and troublemakers, labeled as belonging to a deviant sect, and accused of abandoning religion. As it seems, the documents discussing the uprising briefly mention where the false Shah Ismail came from and describe his qualities, but what is known about his life before and after the rebellion is limited.

== The beginning of the rebellion ==
In 1578, Ottoman commander Lala Mustafa Pasha left Istanbul with the intention of attacking Georgia and Shirvan, arriving in the city of Sivas. At this time, Zulgadir Beylerbeyi and the Qadi of Elbistan wrote him a letter, informing him that on August 12, a person from the Sham Bayadi Turkmen, claiming to be Shah Ismail, had arrived in Elbistan. He had gathered around 200 cavalrymen and engaged in highway robbery, blocking roads at night in the Marash region. They were primarily aiming to recruit more supporters and headed towards the Ashabi-Kahf in Nakhchivan, where they slaughtered victims. Later, they reported their intention to start the uprising to the Qizilbash leader in Bozok and to Haji Bektash. Upon receiving the letter, Lala Mustafa Pasha sent orders to the Turkmen sanjakbeyi Shah Murad Bey, the Bey of Bozok, Cerkaz Bey, the Bey of Ayntab, Keyvan Bey, and the Bey of Kirsehir, Memi Shah, instructing them to kill the false Shah Ismail and his associates and to suppress the uprising. These orders mentioned that the false Shah Ismail and his associates were disrupting the peace in the region, and it was requested that the Turkmen and administrators in the region move together to ensure the safety of the people and to neutralize other troublemakers as an example.

During this period, the false Shah Ismail was gathering supporters on one side. At the same time, some Qizilbash leaders were being protected by certain communities in the region. Although a letter to Bey of Bozok mentioned that certain groups from the Sham Bayadi community, led by Yunus Xalifa, and from the Pahlivanli community, led by Javshidoghlu, were identified as gathering in a house, they were not handed over to Ottoman soldiers and were protected by their communities.

The first confrontation between the parties occurred between Javshidoghlu Huseyn from the false Shah Ismail's followers and the Bey of Bozok. Although Huseyn was captured alive in the initial battle, he was later executed by the order of the Shah. Another battle took place between another Qizilbash leader and Ottoman forces in the Boybeyli plateau. During the preparation for the uprising, a Qizilbash leader named Kose Yunus was captured by the forces of the Bey of Bozok. According to his testimony, the false Shah Ismail had come from the Erciyes province, spent the winter of 1577 in the Emik plains, declared himself as Shah Ismail there, and later ascended to the plateau with the support of the Kemerli and Pahlivanli gatherings of the Yeni-Il Turkmen.

In a decree sent to the Bey of Malatya, it appears that some communities in the region provided financial support to the leaders of the uprising. According to the decree, communities named Izlu, Rishvan, Iskanlu, Solaklu, Sheikh Hasanlu, Soysalu, Ayribuklu, Adaklu, Kalacaklu, Bezki, Cakalu, Mihran, Qarasaz, and Komurlu sent alms and pledges to this person who called himself Shah Ismail. This information was later reported to the Shah by a person named Mehmed, one of the rebels sent to his presence.

Despite the efforts of the governors in the region, it was not possible to capture the false Shah Ismail. In the directive sent to the Bey of Bozok, it was demanded that this person and his followers, whose name was mentioned with Shah Ismail, be captured wherever they were found, serving as an example to other rebels. Indeed, the persistent pursuit by Ottoman forces yielded results. For instance, the vizier of the false Shah Ismail, Khan Piri, was taken captive. According to the information provided by him, Shah Ismail left Bozok with three hundred Qizilbash Turkmen towards a village called Adana, arrived at the camp of Ciyelioglu, stayed there for a few days, and then went to Erguvan. During his stay there, with the support of the communities of Rishvan, Bezki, and Cihanbeyli, and the followers he gathered, they clashed with Malatya, resulting in a major confrontation between them and Abdikendu, one of the men of the Malatya judge, in the village of Almali. Many of Shah Ismail's men were killed in this confrontation, while others fled. Shah Ismail and his men crossed the Euphrates River and headed towards Siverik. After this incident, his name is not encountered again in the sources.

== See also ==
- Şahkulu rebellion
- Nur-Ali Khalifa
