= Peter Courtenay (died 1552) =

Arms of Courtenay of Powderham: Or, three torteaux a label of three points azure each charged with three plates

Sir Peter Courtenay (died 29 May 1552) of Ugbrooke in the parish of Chudleigh, Devon, was Sheriff of Devon in 1548/9.

== Origins ==
He was the 2nd son of Sir William III Courtenay (1477–1535) "The Great", of Powderham, Devon) by his first wife Margaret Edgecombe, daughter of Sir Richard Edgecumbe (c. 1443-1489), Cotehele, Cornwall, and widow of Sir William St. Maure.

== Marriage and children ==
He married Elizabeth Shilston (died 8th Nov. 1605, buried at Chudleigh), daughter of Robert Shilston of Bridestowe, Devon, by whom he had issue.

== Death and burial ==
He was buried at Chudleigh, in which parish church survives his monument.
