= Ottoman persecution of Alevis =

Overview of the history of the persecution of Shia Alevis by the Ottoman Empire

The Ottoman persecution of Alevis is best known in connection with the Ottoman sultan Selim I's reign (1512–1520) and his war against the Safavids in 1514. But there are examples that indicate that there already existed problems with Alevi groups in the Ottoman Empire since the 14th century, The Alevis were generally persecuted for sympathizing in the negative role of Safavids.

== Persecution of Alevi-like groups before 1500 ==
=== 14th century ===
Ottoman problems with heterodox Islamic groups already existed in the 14th century. An example of this can be found in Seyyid Ali Sultan's (also called Kızıldeli) hagiography, which mentions a certain dervish called Seyyid Rüstem (d. 1421). Accordingly, Seyyid Rüstem got in trouble with the local Ottoman officials, despite the fact that he had a personal agreement with the sultan Orhan I to obtain some soil. As the official had heard of Seyyid Rüstem, he shouted: "How dare this Torlak make a mark on my land and depart from obedience? How can he live without my permission?" It should be mentioned that the term Torlak was a typical and often condescending name for Qālandar people.

This may mark a change in the Ottoman position, from accepting the relatively heterodox status quo in Anatolia, into more closely following orthodox Islamic law (Sharia), which did not fall on fertile ground among the more heterodox dervishes. This is also an example of how the Ottoman Sultans went from tribal and clan-based leadership, which had been the situation of Osman I and Orhan I, to more centralist leadership, leading to a decrease of local autonomy.

=== 15th century ===
A growing number of rebellions and problems occurred within the Empire 15th century onwards. Among the most notable examples include the Sheikh Bedreddin rebellion, which began in 1416. This rebellion is believed to have been caused by a culmination of socio-economic and religious tensions. The rebellion, which was also supported by non-Muslims, was eventually defeated, and Sheikh Bedreddin was executed with his apostles (halife) in 1420.

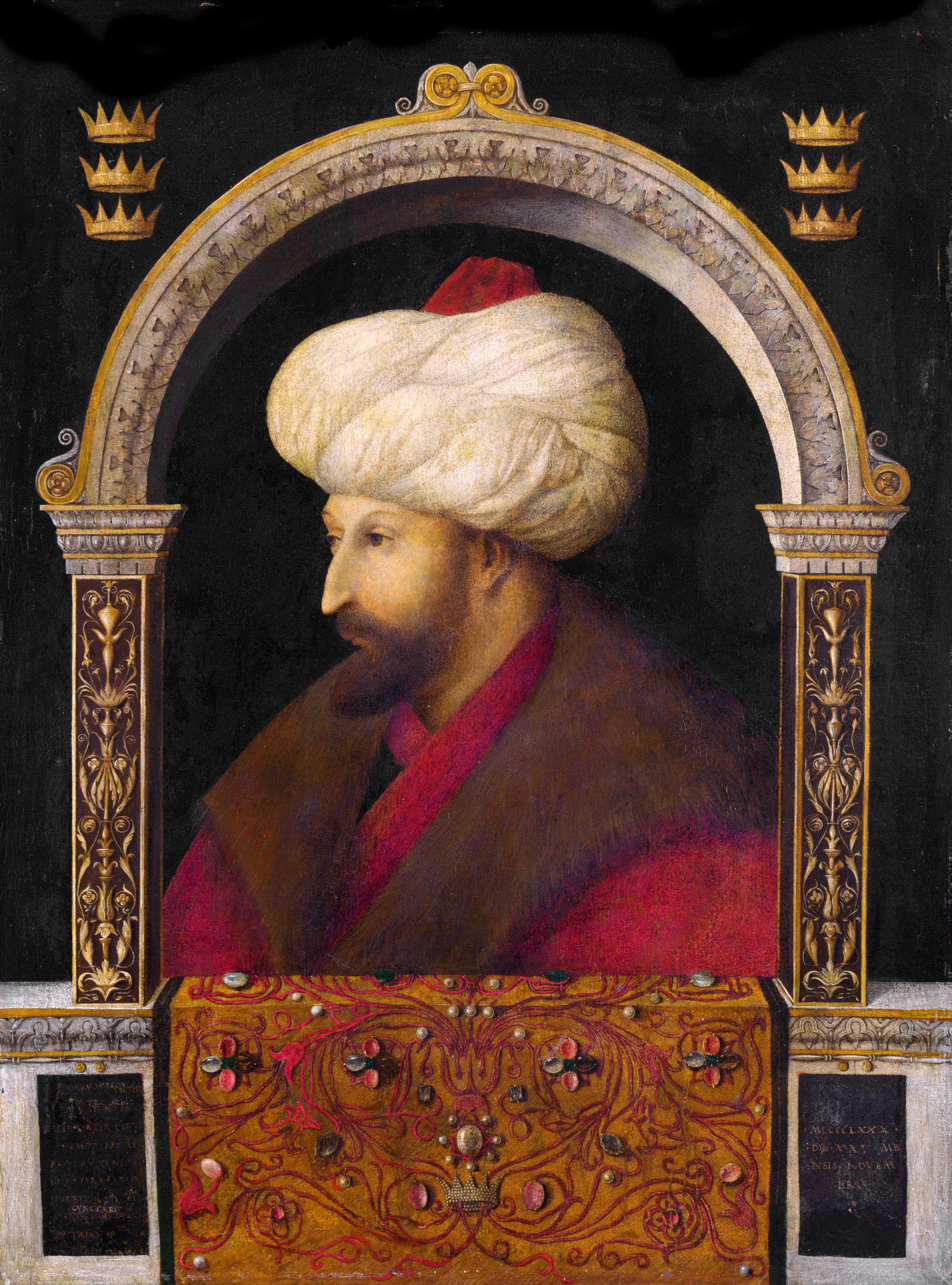
Portrait of Mehmed II (1432–1481) from 1480

It is also known that the Shiite sect hurufiyya was widely spread in Iran and Anatolia and that they became influential in large parts of the Ottoman Empire. In 1445 a group of Hurufis managed to personally meet Sultan Mehmed II, with the intention to invite him to the Hurufi faith. The sultan allowed them to speak for their cause, and also showed clear signs of interest in their mystical doctrines. This aroused discontent among Mehmed II's closest advisers who were not however, able to take direct action. They thus decided to call a scholar named Fakhr al-Din 'Ajami, who pretended to be interested in the Hurufi doctrines and therefore invited the leader of the present Hurufis to his home. However, when the Hurufi explained his faith, Fakhr al-Din could not keep himself from shouting "heretic!". The Hurufi then attempted to seek refuge with Mehmed II, but was subdued by Fakhr al-Din's aggressive behavior and therefore held back from defending his guests. The Hurufis were subsequently led to the new mosque in Edirne, where Fakhr al-Din publicly denounced their faith and preached the spiritual rewards, one would obtain by attending to the extermination of their faith. The Hurufi Order was then ordered to make a huge bonfire to burn their own leader. The head of the Hurufis was then thrown on the fire and the other Hurufis were otherwise executed.

This incident also aligns the previous example with Orhan I, where the Sultan's sympathy towards the Torlaks was also destroyed by officials. In the subsequent part of Mehmed II's reign the Ottoman Empire became extended towards both east and west and thus incorporated new areas where there were a greater propensity of heterodox Islamic traditions. Hurufis and other heterodox Sufi groups were still subject to persecution and isolated massacres in various parts of the Ottoman Empire, however.

In the mid-15th century there was also strife between the Ottoman Empire and the semi-autonomic Karaman area. In 1468–1474 disputes led Mehmed II to drive out tribes, possibly Qizilbāsh, from this area to Rumelia and in 1475 he made an end to the Karaman rule.

== Persecution of Alevis after 1500 ==
=== During Bayezid II (1481–1512) ===
During the sultan Bayezid II the relationship between the state and heterodox groups further worsened. Already by the assassination of the Safavid spiritual leader Shaykh Haydar in 1488, in a letter the Ottoman Sultan Bayezid II had expressed that the news has multiplied my joy and about Haydar's supporters, the Qizilbāshes, he said: may God curse Haydar's heretical followers. Only four years later, in 1492, there was an attempt of murdering the sultan by a dervish and a document from 1501 also reveals that Bayezid II had ordered the execution of all Qizilbāshes who were captured from traveling to Iran. The rest of his reign was also marked by numerous Qizilbāsh rebellions, which Bayezid II tried to overcome by deporting thousands of Qizilbāsh from Anatolia to some of the new conquered coastal areas of Greece: Morea, Modon, Coron and Lepanto. The official reason for the deportations was that Qizilbāshes according to religious scholars were "infidels".

The oldest preserved religious statement (fatwa) on the Qizilbāshes was also issued under Bayezid II by the then Ottoman Mufti Hamza Saru Görez (d. 1512).

=== During Selim I (1512–1520) ===
Bayezid II's son, Selim I, however did not think his father had taken sufficiently hard measures against the Qizilbāshes. As governor of Trabzon, he had been closely acquainted with the Safavids and the Qizilbāsh success in Iran and eastern Anatolia. Against his father's desire he had also repeatedly mobilized military forces and made attacks on Safavid land. It is also known that Selim I had a great hatred towards Shia Muslims in general, especially the heterodox Qizilbāsh. Therefore, liquidated three of his brothers and forced deposed his father to abdicate to himself to seize power. He then sent his father Bayezid II off on a supposed vacation after which he too was killed.

Upon ascending to the throne, Selim I got the Ottoman Shaykh ul-Islam ibni Kemal (d. 1533) to issue a new fatwa against the Qizilbāshes to finally legitimize their killing. He then gathered a great army consisting of 200,000 men to lead a gratuitous war against the Safavids. On his march to face Ismā'il at Chāldirān, Selim had many Alevis massacred, seeing them as enemies of the Ottoman Empire. In an Ottoman source, the Selimşâh-name, this event is described as such:

Her şeyi bilen Sultan, o kavmin etbâını kısım kısım ve isim isim yazmak üzere, memleketin her tarafına bilgiç katipler gönderdi; yedi yaşından yetmiş yaşına kadar olanların defterleri divâna getirilmek üzere emredildi; getirilen defterlere nazaran, ihtiyar-genç kırk bin kişi yazılmıştı; ondan sonra her memleketin hâkimlerine memurlar defterler getirdiler; bunların gittikleri yerlerde kılıç kullanılarak, bu memleketlerdeki maktullerin adedi kırk bini geçti.

The omniscient Sultan Selim I sent accurate writers all over the country to take note of the supporters of the group called Qizilbāshs, part by part and name by name, it has been ordered by Divan [a senior executive institution of the Ottoman Empire] to retrieve records to Divan on everyone from age seven to seventy and the names of forty thousand persons were noted in those registers, old and young, then officials brought the registers to the administrators of all regions [of the country]; the places they went, they killed more than forty thousand by sword in these areas.

=== After Selim I ===
After Selim I's reign, subsequent sultans continued harsh treatment towards Qizilbāshes in Anatolia. Qizilbāshes responded to the oppression by revolting against the Ottoman rule. These frequent rebellions continued periodically up to the early 17th century.

The extremely violent period from 16th to the 17th century, however, was eventually relatively subdued, but the oppression of Qizilbāshes continued to a lesser extent.

=== Typical persecution methods ===
From the early 16th century the Ottoman administration specialized in chasing Qizilbāshes. This century was perhaps the harshest century for the Alevis (Qizilbāshes). They were persecuted for both sympathizing with the Safavid struggle, but also because of their beliefs, which were considered heretical. In order to capture Qizilbāshes, the Ottoman state used several methods. Being Qizilbāsh was a crime on its own and Qizilbāshes were kept under constant surveillance. Some of the most frequently used surveillance and persecution methods in the Ottoman Empire were:

- Persecution based on others' reports/notifications.
- Open or secret persecution.
- By asking people who were regarded as more credible or objective, for example officials or Sunnis.

=== Typical punishment methods ===
The Ottomans also had different methods of punishment used on Qizilbāshes. Most of the punishments took place by fabricating a reason to kill them. These false accusations were often led into the formal procedures to make them seem more realistic. In cases where the accused Qizilbāshes had many sympathizers or relatives, the Ottoman regime tried to avoid riots by not killing too many at a time.

Some of the most common punishments were:

- Expulsion: Many Qizilbāshs were expelled to Cyprus and cut off from their villages and families, but the Qizilbāshes who were halifes were executed immediately. The most typical displacement locations were Cyprus, Modon, Coroni, Budun(?) and Plovdiv.
- Imprisonment: Some were also jailed and then usually expelled to Cyprus to cut them off from their families.
- Forced labor: Another method of punishment was to send Qizilbāshs for forced labor on galleys (Kürek mahkumiyeti) where they should work as oarsmen.
- Drowning: Some Qizilbāshes were executed by being drowned in the Halys River (Kızılırmak), others were executed on the spot. Other times Qizilbāshes were executed with the sole purpose of deterring other Qizilbāshes and teaching them a lesson.
- Execution: This method, often termed siyaset or hakkından gelme in the Ottoman archives, was perhaps the most widely used method of punishment on Qizilbāshes.
- Stoning: Although stoning was normally only used against people who had committed adultery, (Note: Evidence only indicates isolated uses of stoning as a punishment, whether for adultery—which was often ignored—or for other crimes.) this method of punishment was also used. There is an example of a Qizilbāsh named Koyun Baba who was stoned because of his faith.

== Religious rulings (fatwa) ==
The first religious statement on the Qizilbāshes was probably issued under Bayezid II within the first years of the 16th century, but the oldest preserved fatwa is the one belonging to Hamza Saru Görez (d. 1512), an Ottoman Mufti of Bayezid II's reign:

Ey Müslümanlar! Bilin ve haberdar olun ki, reisleri Erdebil oğlu İsmail olan Kızılbaş topluluğu, Peygamberimizin şeriatını, sünnetini, İslam dinini, din ilmini, iyiyi ve doğruyu beyan eden Kuran'ı küçük gördüler. Yüce Tanrı'nın yasakladığı günahlara helal gözü ile baktılar. Kutsal Kuran'ı, öteki din kitaplarını tahkir ettiler ve onları ateşe atarak yaktılar. Hatta kendi melun reislerini Tanrı yerine koyup ona secde ettiler. Hazreti Ebu Bekir'e, Hazreti Ömer'e sövüp, onların halifeliklerini inkar ettiler. Peygamberimizin karısı Ayşe anamıza iftira ettiler ve sövdüler. Peygamberimizin şeriatını ve İslam dinini ortadan kaldırmayı düşündüler. Onların burada bahsedilen ve bunlara benzeyen öteki kötü sözleri ve hareketleri benim ve öteki bütün İslam dininin alimleri tarafından açıkça bilinmektedir. Bu nedenlerden ötürü şeriat hükmünün ve kitaplarımızın verdiği haklarla, bu topluluğun kafirler ve dinsizler topluluğu olduğuna dair fetva verdik. Onlara sempati gösteren, batıl dinlerini kabul eden ve yardımcı olanlar da kafir ve dinsizdirler. Bu gibi kimselerin topluluğunu dağıtmak bütün Müslümanlar'ın vazifesidir. Bu arada, Müslümanlar'dan ölen kutsal şehitlerin yeri cenneti ala'dır. O kafirlerden ölenler ise, hakir olup cehennemin dibinde yer tutacaklardır. Bu topluluğun durumu kafirlerin (kitap sahibi Hristiyan ve Yahudiler'in) halinden daha kötüdür. Bu topluluğun kestiği veya gerek şahinle gerek ok ile gerekse köpek ile avladığı hayvanlar murdardır. Onların gerek kendi aralarında gerekse başka topluluklarla yaptıkları evlenmeler muteber değildir. Bunlara miras bırakılmaz. Sadece İslam'ın Sultanı'nın, onlara ait kasaba varsa, o kasabanın bütün insanlarını öldürüp mallarını, miraslarını, evlatlarını alma hakkı vardır. Ancak bu mallar İslam'ın gazileri arasında taksim edilmelidir. Bu toplamadan sonra onların tövbe ve nedametlerine inanmamalı ve hepsi öldürülmelidir. Hatta bu şehirde onlardan olduğu bilinen veya onlarla birlik olduğu tesbit edilen kimse öldürülmelidir. Bu türlü topluluk hem kafir ve imansız hem de kötülük yapan kimselerdir. Bu iki sebepten onların öldürülmesi vacibdir. Dine yardım edenlere Allah yardım eder, Müslümana kötülük yapanlara Allah da kötülük eder.

O Muslims! Know and be aware that the Qizilbāsh people, whose leader is Ismail son of Ardabil has looked down on our Prophet's laws (Sharia), his custom (sunna), the religion of Islam, the religious science and the Qur'an, which tells us what is right and wrong. They have regarded the prohibitions of God as being allowed. They have offended the Holy Qur'an and burned it by throwing it into the fire. They have even seen their own damned leader as God and prostrated to him. They have cursed and denied the caliphate of the noble Abu Bakr and Umar. They have slandered and cursed the Prophet's wife, our mother Aisha. They intend to eradicate the Prophet's laws (Sharia) and the religion of Islam. Their other offensive statements and behavior similar to what is mentioned here, is known clearly by both me and the rest of the Islamic scholars. We have therefore in accordance with the rules of the religious law (Sharia) and the rights provided in our books, issued a statement (fatwa) towards this population as being infidel and pagan. It is any Muslims duty to destroy such a population. The holy martyr Muslims who die in this connection will achieve the highest paradise (Jannat ul-Ala). The infidels who die, will become contemptible and end up in a place in the deepest hell. The condition of this population is worse than the unbelievers (Christians and Jews). The animals that these people butcher or hunt down are impure (murdar), whether it is by falconry, bow or dog. The marriages they make among each other or with other populations are not valid. They have no right to inheritance. If they live in a village, only the Sultan of Islam, has the right to take over their properties and values and their children by slaughtering all the villagers. These values can only be divided between soldiers of Islam. After this collection, one should not listen to their repentances and regrets, but kill all of them. If it is known that there are any one of them or anyone who supports them here in this town, these must be killed. This kind of population is both incredulous and pagan and at the same time harmful. For these two reasons, it is necessary (vajib) to kill them. God helps those who help the religion and harms those who do harm to a Muslim.

== Prohibition of the Bektashi Order (1826) ==
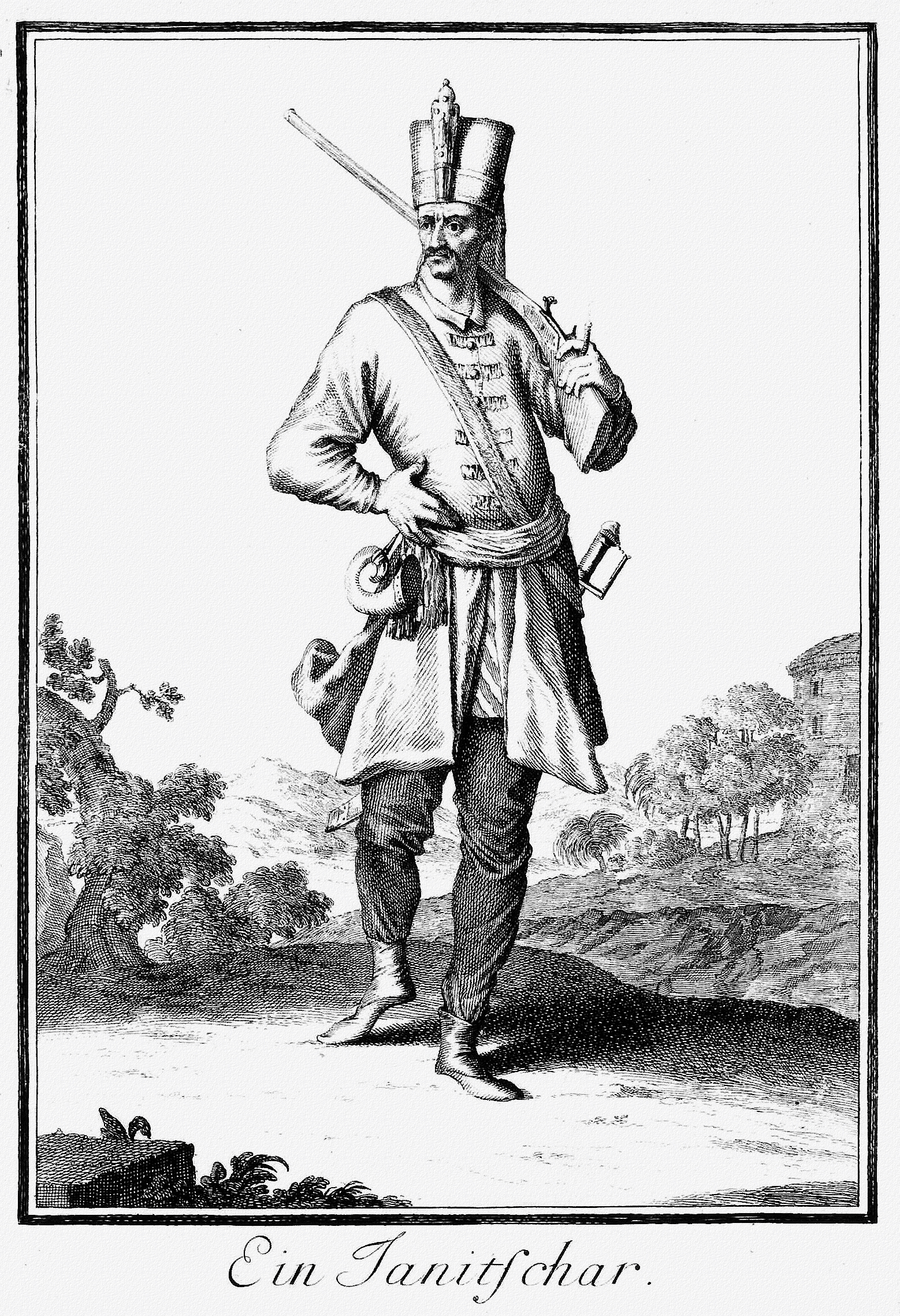
Image of a Janissary from 1703

From the 19th century the Bektashis who meanwhile had benefited from an Ottoman acceptance also suffered persecution. This began after the Ottoman abolition of the Bektashi Janissary Corps in 1826.

According to historian Patrick Kinross, Sultan Mahmud II had knowingly encouraged drummer to revolt as part of the sultan's "coup against the Janissaries". Through a fatwa, the sultan informed them that he was about to create a new army, organized and trained in accordance with European standards. As expected, the Janissaries then drew mutinied and advanced against the sultan's palace. In the following battle the Janissary barracks took fire because of a heavy artillery attack. This resulted in the killing of 4,000–8,000) Janissaries. The survivors were then either expelled or executed and their possessions were confiscated by the sultan. This event is called Vaka-i Hayriye (the Auspicious Event).

The remaining Janissaries were then executed by beheading in a tower in Thessaloniki, which was later called "the Blood Tower". In this context, a fatwa was also issued, which allowed the prohibition of the Bektashi Sufi Order. The former leader of the Bektashi Order, Hamdullah Çelebi, was initially sentenced to death, but then sent into exile in Amasya where his mausoleum exists today. Hundreds of Bektashi tekkes were closed and the working dervishes and babas were either executed or expelled. Some of the closed tekkes were transferred to the Sunni Naqshbandi Order. It all resulted in the execution of 4,000–7,500 Bektashis and the demolition of at least 550 big Bektashi monasteries (dergâh). The official reasons given for the prohibition of the Bektashi Order were heresy and moral deviation.

== Implications of persecution ==
This centuries-long suppression has led to a general fear among Alevis. This has meant that until recently they have tended to keep their religious identity hidden from strangers. Their religious assemblies (ayin-i cem) have also been practised secretly with several guards having to keep watch. Suppression has also been one of the reasons that Alevis often held their religious assemblies (ayin-i cem) at nights in secret.

It is also noteworthy that most Alevi villages and settlements are very remote. They are usually located in high mountain areas, in deep valleys or surrounded by dense forest areas. Only a minority of Alevi villages are located on lush and level plains. This is because, historically, these villages, due to their strategic locations, have been protected from attacks by hostile outsiders.

These circumstances have also caused Alevis to feel like second-class citizens even after the founding of the Republic of Turkey. Alevis are often assessed from a Sunni perspective, and may need to defend themselves on issues such as why they do not pray in mosques, why they do not go on pilgrimage to Mecca or why they do not fast during Ramadan.

== See also ==
- Persecution of Ottoman Muslims
- Ottoman casualties of World War I
- Destruction of Kashmiri Shias
- Xenophobia and discrimination in Turkey

== Sources ==
- Karagoz, Huseyn Mirza (2017). "Alevism in Turkey: Tensions and patterns of migration". In Issa, Tözün (ed.). Alevis in Europe: Voices of Migration, Culture and Identity. Routledge.
