= Şahkulu =

Rebel leader in Anatolia (died c. 1511)

Baba Şahkulu Tekeli

Personal life
- Born: Unknown, Teke Peninsula, Anatolia
- Died: c. 1511 Unknown
- Parent: Ḥasan Ḫalīfe (father)
- Era: Early modern period
- Known for: Şahkulu rebellion

Religious life
- Religion: Shia Islam; Alevism

Senior posting
- Period in office: 16th century
- Influenced by: Ismail I

Şahkulu (Note: Also spelled Shah Kulu, Shah Qoli, or Shah Quli. Described in Ottoman sources as "Şeytan Kulu" (شیطان قولی lit. 'devil's slave' in Turkish),) (Ottoman Turkish: شاه قولی, romanized: Şāh Ḳulu, lit. 'servant of shah'; fl. 1500–1511), also known as Şahkulu Baba, (Note: Also spelled Shah-Qoli Baba, Shahqoli Baba) or Karabıyıkoğlu (lit. 'son of black moustache' in Turkish), was the leader of the pro-Shia and pro-Safavid uprising in Anatolia – the Şahkulu Rebellion – directed against the Ottoman Empire in 1511. He was viewed as a Messiah and Prophet by his followers. His death in battle signified the end of the uprising.

== Early life ==
His father was Hasan Halife, who served Shaykh Haydar, father of Ismail I, that became his representative (halife) to persuade the population of Teke region. Ottoman sources claim Şahkulu was born in a village called Yalınlıköy, modern day Antalya province.

Şahkulu was a member of the Turkmen Tekkelu tribe.

== Rebellion ==
Being inspired by Safavid missionaries, the Turkmens living on Ottoman soil, "as far west as Konya", were mobilized in a "fervent messianic movement", led by Şahkulu. Şahkulu and his followers tried to "replicate" the same type of revolt led by Ismail I several years earlier, "perhaps in anticipation of a union with the Safavids". Şahkulu also worked as the chief of the Royal Ottoman Company of Designers in Istanbul in the early 16th century. His army burned Sunni mosques and Qurans, raped the natives, killed women and children, and sacked several Ottoman towns.

== Aftermath ==
Şahkulu was killed in 1511, and the pro-Safavid movement was "halted temporarily". The Ottomans beheaded and then burned Sahkulu's body. But the anxiety of the Ottomans, in relation to "losing much of their Asian possessions was not eased". Nor did the hatred of the Ottomans for Ismail I cease to exist, even though Ismail apologized for the atrocities committed by the Turkmens and "disowned" Şahkulu. As the possibility existed of a "mass Turkmen exodus into the Safavid realm", Bayezid II sought to establish good relations with Ismail, "at least on the surface, and welcomed Ismail's gestures to establish good neighborly relations". In letters sent to Ismail, Bayezid II addressed Ismail as "heir to the kingdom of Kaykhosrow – the legendary great king of the Shahnameh – and to Dara (Darius) of the ancient Persian Empire". Abbas Amanat adds: "He further advised Ismail to behave royally, preserve his precious and strategically vital kingdom with justice and equanimity, end forced conversions, and live in peace with his neighbors".

After Şahkulu's followers fled to Iran, Ismail I punished the commanders of Şahkulu, who had killed 500 merchants going from Tabriz to Ottoman territory and pillaged their goods, and divided the followers among his emirs.

Bayezid II had faced a revolt from his own son Selim (who succeeded as Selim I), in the final years of his rule. Unlike his father, Selim, then still a prince, disliked his father's appeasement policies towards the Safavids. When Selim I thus ascended the throne in 1512, things changed drastically. Tensions rose, which eventually led to the Battle of Chaldiran in 1514.

== In popular culture ==
A fictionalized version of Şahkulu appears in the Assassin's Creed franchise, where he is called Shahkulu and is a member of the Byzantine Rite of the Templar Order, having joined after being promised revenge against the Ottomans. He first appears as a supporting antagonist in the 2011 video game Assassin's Creed: Revelations, where he assists fellow Templar Manuel Palaiologos with his plans to rebuild the fallen Byzantine Empire. In the game, Shahkulu is shown surviving beyond his recorded historical death in 1511, and is instead assassinated by the protagonist Ezio Auditore at the Templar hideout in Cappadocia in early 1512.

Shahkulu is also featured in the board game Assassin's Creed: Arena, released on 26 February 2014.

== Sources ==
- Amanat, Abbas (2017). Iran: A Modern History. Yale University Press. ISBN 978-0300231465.
- Bowden, Oliver (2011). Assassin's Creed: Revelations. Penguin UK. p. 52. ISBN 9780141966724.
- Gibb, H.A.R., ed. (1954). The Encyclopaedia of Islam. Brill Archive. ISBN 978-9004060562.
- Jafarian, Rasool (2012). "The Political Relations of Shah Esma'il I with the Mamluk Government (1501–16/907–22)". In Floor, Willem; Herzig, Edmund (eds.). Iran and the World in the Safavid Age. I.B. Tauris. ISBN 978-1780769905.
- Matthee, Rudolph P. (1999). The Politics of Trade in Safavid Iran: Silk for Silver, 1600–1730. Cambridge: Cambridge University Press. p. 120. ISBN 978-0-521-64131-9.
