= William Courtenay (1477–1535) =

Arms of Courtenay of Powderham: Or, three torteaux a label azure

Sir William Courtenay (1477 – November 1535) "The Great", of Powderham in Devon, was a leading member of the Devon gentry and a courtier of King Henry VIII, having been from September 1512 one of the king's Esquires of the Body. He served as Sheriff of Devon three times: from February to November 1522, 1525/26, and 1533/34. He was elected Knight of the Shire for Devon in 1529.

== Origins ==
He was the eldest son and heir of Sir William Courtenay (1451–1512) of Powderham by his wife Cecily Cheyne, daughter of Sir John Cheyne of Pinhoe. The family of Courtenay "of Powderham", always known thus until 1556 to distinguish it from the senior line of Courtenay of Tiverton Castle, Earls of Devon, was one of the most influential and best connected in Devon from the 15th century onwards. The cadet line of "Courtenay of Powderham" was descended from Sir Philip Courtenay (1340–1406), a younger son of Hugh Courtenay, 2nd Earl of Devon (1303–1377), of Tiverton Castle, but eventually itself in 1831 was officially recognised by the House of Lords as having become in 1556 de jure holder of the Earldom of Devon inherited after the decease of a distant cousin, Edward Courtenay, 1st Earl of Devon (1527–1556), the last male of the senior line of Courtenay of Tiverton.

== Career ==
William entered his inheritance on 24 November 1512, receiving possession of the family's principal seat, the manor of Powderham, on 11 September. He had lived as a younger man, following his first marriage, in East Coker, Somerset. As a boy he was bound over with another minor ward, Richard Cornwall, to his own recognizance to remain within two miles of the walls of the City of London. The bond was cancelled by April 1512. In 1513 he was appointed Keeper of the royal forest of Petherton Park in Somerset, being summoned to attend upon the King at Easter.

Courtenay was an Esquire of the Body participating in Henry VIII's military campaign of 1514 to Gascony, and again in 1523. He was appointed a Commissioner for the collection of the Tax Subsidy in 1512, 1514, and 1515. Sir William was one of the signatories to the Westminster Tournament Challenge and is depicted as one of the challengers in the subsequent Westminster Tournament Roll. He was also one of the many knights in the king's retinue at the Field of the Cloth of Gold, and also accompanied the king at his meeting with Emperor Charles V at Gravelines. He was probably knighted before these two latter events, the exact date remaining unknown, being in March 1520.

Sir William was regularly appointed a Commissioner for Devon and Cornwall from 1527. He was a Commissioner of the Peace in April 1529, on the fall of Wolsey. Sir William signed a plea for his nephew's debts at Powderham in a letter to Thomas Cromwell dated 3 May 1532 – an obligation that put him at Cromwell's service. On 22 May 1533 he wrote to Cromwell pleading injury and illness on the occasion of Queen Anne Boleyn's coronation. He recorded falling twice from his horse when riding a long way from home on the Devon estates. He also wrote to request Cromwell to organize a visit from the King to his manor at Petherton in 1533. Later Courtenay sent a servant to Cromwell, Richard Southwill, to be found a wife, for a six-month fee in lieu of debts. Sir William was continually in debt at Powderham. Cromwell, forever scheming at court, held one of Courtenay's cousins to ransom, demanding resolution of payments.

Courtenay also communicated the activity of suspicious clerics refusing to abandon their abbeys. John Pruste the former abbot of Hartland, pleaded Cromwell "as a good master", but that had not prevented Sir Thomas Arundell's ad quondam servants taking off the livestock. The last abbot, Sir Thomas Pope was accused of looting the silver plate that belonged to the Bishop of Exeter. Nevertheless, Courtenay was accused of taking the abbey's account and record books. He was an instrument of the dissolution of the monasteries used by Thomas Cromwell to carry through the transfer of assets and wealth to the Treasury in the westcountry. It is probable that he proposed a marriage alliance with a daughter-in-law of Richard Cromwell. Authority on three separate elections, as Sheriff of Devon made warranted arrests and execution of duty convenient for the Crown.

Courtenay was appointed commissioner in charge of demolishing all the fish weirs in Devon, following the legislation of 1535 which ordered the "putting down" of all weirs in the country. This role involved him in performing a role unpopular with his fellow Devon gentry whose weirs were major assets in providing salmon. One of his last actions before his death, recorded in the Lisle Papers is to have received a visit at Powderham on 11 November 1535 from Lady Lisle's land-agent begging him to spare her weir at Umberleigh. Courtenay replied that he dare not as he had received "privy letters" from the king which determined him to report when next at court that all the weirs in Devon were down, and that not even for an inducement of 1,000 marks would he contemplate leaving Umberleigh weir standing for one week longer "for fear of the king's displeasure".

== Marriages and children ==
Courtenay married twice:

- First, after 1503 to Margaret Edgecumbe (died before October 1512), daughter of Sir Richard Edgecumbe (c. 1443–1489), MP of Cotehele, Cornwall. She was the widow of William St. Maur (or Seymour). By her he had five sons, including:
  - George Courtenay (died 1533), eldest son and heir apparent, who pre-deceased his father and married Catherine St. Leger, daughter of Sir George St. Ledger, and had issue William Courtenay (1527–1557), de jure Earl of Devon (recognised retroactively in 1831).
  - Sir Peter Courtenay (died 29 May 1552), 2nd son, of Ugbrooke in the parish of Chudleigh, Sheriff of Devon in 1549. He was buried at Chudleigh, in which parish church survives his monument. He married Elizabeth Shilston (died 8 Nov. 1605, buried at Chudleigh), daughter of Robert Shilston of Bridestowe, by whom he had issue.
  - Henry Courtenay
  - Nicholas Courtenay
  - Anthony Courtenay
- Secondly, before 27 Oct. 1512, he married Mary Gainsford (c. 1495–1572), daughter of Sir John Gainsford of Crowhurst, Surrey, by his wife Anne Hawte. After Courtenay's death Mary remarried to Sir Anthony Kingston (died 1556) of Painswick, Gloucestershire, and went to live with him on the Courtenay manor of Chudleigh which together with Honiton had been her jointure. By Mary Gainsford, Courtenay had four sons and three daughters:
  - James Courtenay (born 1521)
  - John Courtenay (born c. 1523), married Thomasine Huntington.
  - Philip Courtenay (born 1523)
  - Gertrude Courtenay (born c. 1521), married Sir John Chichester (died 1569) of Raleigh.
  - Catherine Courtenay (born 1527)
  - Elizabeth Courtenay (born 1529)
  - Thomas Courtenay (born 1533)

== Death and heir ==
He died at Powderham between 23 and 24 November 1535. His heir was his grandson Sir William Courtenay (1527–1557) of Powderham, de jure Earl of Devon (recognised retroactively in 1831 by the House of Lords), son of his eldest son George Courtenay who had predeceased him in 1533.

== Sources ==
- G. E. Cokayne, P.Vicary Gibbs, H. Doubleday, and Lord Howard de Walden, The Complete Peerage of Great Britain and Ireland extant, dormant, abeyant and extinct, volumes XIV (London 1913-1958)
- Charles Mosley, Burkes Peerage and Baronetage, 106th edition (London 1999)
- Charles Kidd, and David Williamson, Debrett's Peerage (London 2000)
