= Juan de Agramonte =

Catalonian explorer (fl. 1511)

Juan de Agramonte (fl. 1511) (in Catalan, Joan d'Agramunt) was a sailor from Catalonia thought to have possibly travelled to Newfoundland, Canada in 1511.

Because of England's ever increasing voyages to the New World, Spain became concerned by English intrusions into her territories, and planned to explore the north Atlantic coast in order to take possession of it. Juan de Dornelos was placed in command of an expedition in 1500 which never did happen as the expedition was never put to sea.

After the failed attempt in 1500, Agramonte, a sailor and native of Lleida, signed a contract with the daughter of Ferdinand of Aragon on October 29, 1511, to lead an expedition of discovery and exploration to Terra Nova in the years following the voyages of John Cabot. The expedition, which was to comprise two ships, had orders not to land on soil under the jurisdiction of the kingdom of Portugal.

It has been speculated that this expedition also did not take place. The fact that these expeditions were contemplated furthers the notion that the shores of Newfoundland had previously been visited by the Bretons and that a part of the Newfoundland territory had been discovered by Portugal.
