= Sydney Anglo =

British historian (1934–2025)

Sydney Anglo, FSA, FRHistS, FLSW, FBA (1 March 1934 – 14 October 2025) was a British historian, academic and scholar. His last post was as Professor Emeritus at Swansea University.

== Career ==
Anglo began his academic career at the Warburg Institute, where he was a senior fellow from 1970 to 1971.

In 1981, Anglo joined Swansea University as a professor of the History of Ideas, a position he held until 1986.

From 1986 to 1999, Anglo served as a research professor at Swansea University. Concurrently, he held the position of Chairman of the Society for Renaissance Studies from 1986 to 1989. He was eventually appointed Professor Emeritus at Swansea University.

Anglo was a Founding Fellow of the Learned Society of Wales.

== Personal life and death ==
Anglo married Margaret M. McGowan in 1964. He died at home on 14 October 2025, at the age of 91.

== Bibliography ==
- Anglo, Sydney, 'The Court Festivals of Henry VII: A Study Based Upon the Account Books of John Heron, Treasurer of the Chamber', Bulletin of John Rylands Library, 43, 1960–1961
- Anglo, Sydney (1969). Spectacle, Pageantry, and Early Tudor Policy
- Anglo, Sydney (1969). Machiavelli: A Dissection
- Anglo, Sydney (1992). Images of Tudor Kingship
- Anglo, Sydney (2000). The Martial Arts of Renaissance Europe
- Anglo, Sydney (2005). Machiavelli – The First Century: Studies in Enthusiasm, Hostility, and Irrelevance
- Anglo, Sydney (2012). The Noble Art of the Sword: Fashion and Fencing in Renaissance Europe, 1520–1630
