= 1494 in France =

- Decades: 1470s; 1480s; 1490s; 1500s; 1510s
- See also: History of France; Timeline of French history; List of years in France

Events from the year 1494 in France.

== Incumbents ==
- Monarch – Charles VIII

== Events ==
- 25 January 1494: king Ferdinand I of Naples dies and was succeeded by his son Alfonso II of Naples (who also laid claim to Milan). King Charles VIII of France disputed the succession, and began preparations for an invasion of Italy to enforce his claim on the Neapolitan kingship.
- 5–8 September 1494: Battle of Rapallo. A land battle involving the French fleet. French victory; Neapolitans abandoned Rapallo, which the French army sack.
- 11 September 1494: French king Charles VIII and Louis of Orléans arrived in Asti and concluded an alliance with duke Ludovico Sforza and Beatrice d'Este.
- October 22 – Ludovico Sforza becomes Duke of Milan, and invites Charles VIII of France to invade Italy in support of his claim, beginning the Italian War of 1494–98.
- 19–21 October 1494: Siege of Mordano. Franco–Milanese victory; the French soldiers sacked Mordano, the Milanese soldiers tried to protect the civilians.
- 26–29 October 1494: Siege of Fivizzano. French victory; the French army sacked the town.
- November 17 – Italian War of 1494–98: The armies of Charles VIII of France enter Florence.
- November 28 – French military under Charles VIII marched on to Rome from Florence.
- December 31 – January 6: peaceful French entry into Rome with Pope Alexander VI's permission, but some French looting takes place.

=== Full date unknown ===
- Charles VIII of France purchases the right to the Byzantine Empire from exiled pretender, Andreas Palaiologos.

== Births ==
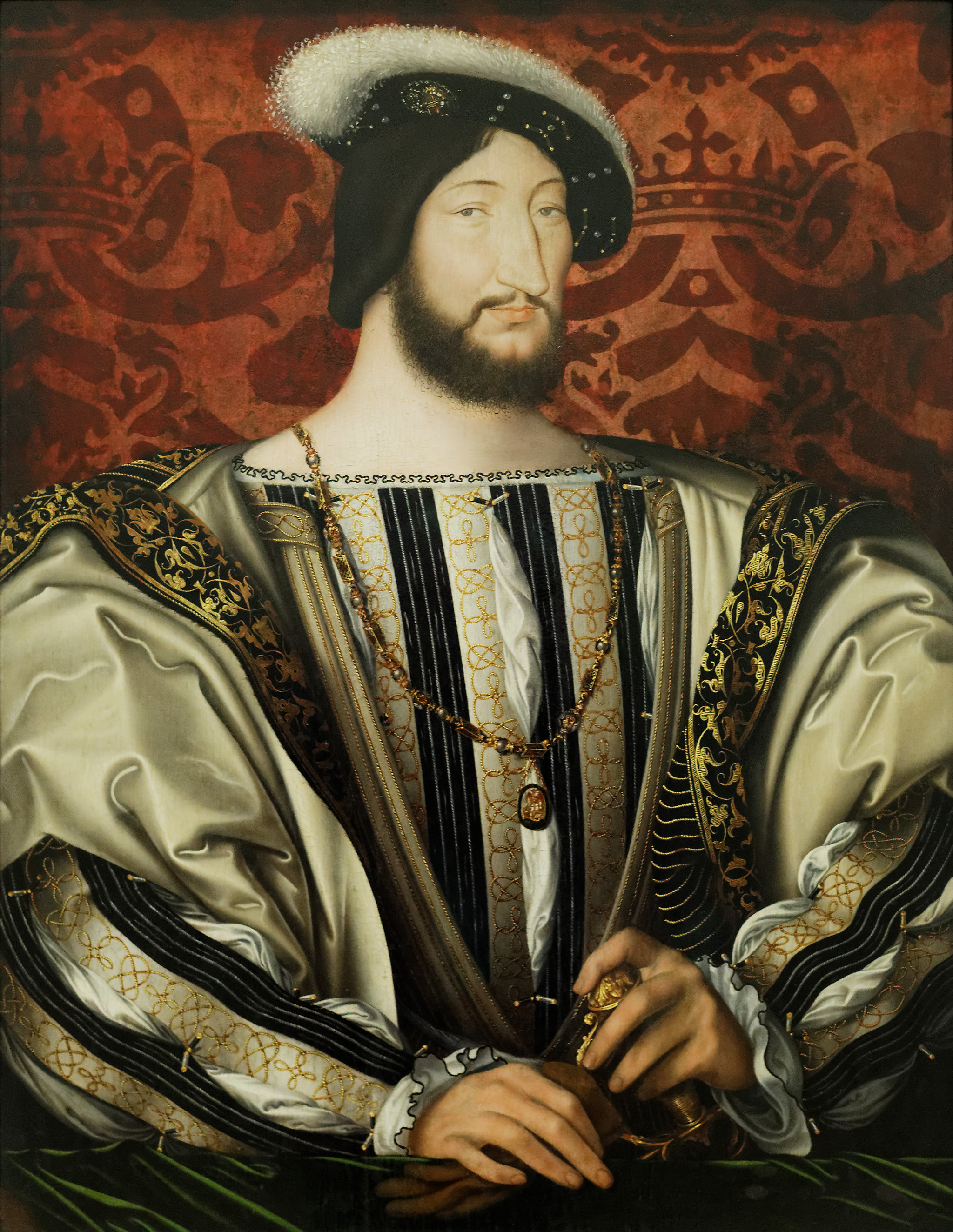
Francis I, King of France 1515–1547

=== Full date unknown ===
- Francis I of France (died 1547)
- Oronce Finé, mathematician and cartographer (died 1555)
- Jean Parmentier, navigator, cartographer, and poet (died 1529)
- Renée of Bourbon, dutchess consort (died 1539)

== Deaths ==
- 22 April – Philippe de Crèvecœur d'Esquerdes, military commander (born 1418)

=== Full date missing ===
- Gérard Gobaille, bishop
