= Charles of France =

Charles of France might refer to:

== King list of the West Francia or France ==
- Charlemagne (747–814), counted as Charles I, reigned 768–814
- Charles the Bald (823–877), counted as Charles II, reigned 840–877
- Charles the Fat (839–888), counted as Charles III, reigned 884–888
- Charles the Simple (879–929), also counted as Charles III, reigned 893–922
- Charles IV of France (1294–1328), called "the Fair", reigned 1322–1328
- Charles V of France (1338–1380), called "the Wise", reigned 1364–1380
- Charles VI of France (1368–1422), called "the Beloved" and "the Mad", reigned 1380–1422
- Charles VII of France (1403–1461), called "the Victorious" or "the Well-Served", reigned 1422–1461
- Charles VIII of France (1470–1498), called "the Affable", reigned over France 1483–1498 and was de facto King of Naples for five months in 1495, prompting the Italian Wars.
- Charles IX of France (1550–1574), reigned 1560–1574
- Charles X of France (1757–1836), reigned 1824–1830

== Other princes ==
- Charles, Duke of Lower Lorraine (953–993), son of Louis IV of France
- Charles I of Naples (1226–1285), posthumous son of Louis VIII of France, King of Naples as Charles of Anjou, by conquest and by papal grant
- Charles, Count of Valois (1270–1325), son of Philip III of France
- Charles of France (born and died 1386), son of Charles VI of France
- Charles of France (1392–1401), son of Charles VI of France
- Charles de Valois, Duc de Berry (1446–1472), son of Charles VII of France
- Charles Orlando, Dauphin of France (1492–1495), son of Charles VIII of France
- Charles of France (born and died 1496), son of Charles VIII of France
- Charles II de Valois, Duke of Orléans (1522–1545), son of Francis I of France
- Charles de Valois, Duke of Angoulême (1573–1650), illegitimate son of Charles IX of France
- Charles, Duke of Berry (1686–1714), grandson of Louis XIV of France
- Charles Ferdinand, Duke of Berry (1778–1820), son of Charles X of France
- Louis XVII (1785-1795), also called Louis Charles de France, son of Louis XVI of France, regarded as king by royalists 1793-1795 during the French Revolution, but never ruled
