= 1489 in France =

- Decades: 1460s; 1470s; 1480s; 1490s; 1500s
- See also: History of France; Timeline of French history; List of years in France

Events from the year 1489 in France.

== Incumbents ==
- Monarch – Charles VIII ( As king), Anne of France (As regent)

== Events ==
- 10 February – Treaty of Redon is signed between England and Brittany to prevent France from annexing Brittany.
- 22 July – Treaty of Frankfurt is signed between MaximilianI of Austria and King Charles VIII, surrendering French occupation of part of Brittany to Anne of Brittany. In return Brittany committed to expelling English forces from the duchy.

== Births ==
- 2 June – Charles, Duke of Vendôme, Soldier and courtier. (d.1537)
- 4 June – Antoine, Duke of Lorraine, French aristocrat and general(d.1544).
- 10 December – Gaston of Foix, Duke of Nemours.(d.1512)

=== Date Unknown ===
- Charles IV, Duke of Alençon, Prince and military commander.(d.1525)
- William Farel, Evangelist (d.1565)

== Deaths ==
- 21 August – Louis de Laval, Nobleman and politician.(b.1411)
