= 1492 in France =

- Decades: 1470s; 1480s; 1490s; 1500s; 1510s
- See also: History of France; Timeline of French history; List of years in France

Events from the year 1492 in France.

== Incumbents ==
- Monarch – Charles VIII

== Events ==
- 8 February – Anne of Brittany is crowned queen of France.
- 3 October – Henry VII dispatches an English expedition to lay Siege of Boulogne
- 3 November – The Peace of Étaples is agreed between France and king Henry VII of England. Charles VIII grants a number of concessions including a payment of £153,000 to Henry VII to withdraw his forces.

== Births ==
- Marguerite de Navarre, French-born Queen of Navarre (died 1549)
- Charles Orlando, Dauphin of France, prince (died 1495)
- Anne d'Alençon, nobleman (died 1562)

== Deaths ==
- Antoine Busnois, composer (born 1430)
