= 1495 in France =

- Decades: 1470s; 1480s; 1490s; 1500s; 1510s
- See also: History of France; Timeline of French history; List of years in France

Events from the year 1495 in France.

== Incumbents ==
- Monarch – Charles VIII

== Events ==
- 22 February – King Charles VIII enters Naples in an extravagant display.
- 20 May – Charles VIII and his army depart from Naples and head back to France, leaving the count de Montpensier, Gilbert of Bourbon, in charge.

== Deaths ==
- 21 January – Madeleine of Valois, French princess (b. 1443)
- 6 December – Charles Orlando, Dauphin of France (b. 1492)
