= 1499 in France =

- Decades: 1470s; 1480s; 1490s; 1500s; 1510s
- See also: History of France; Timeline of French history; List of years in France

Events from the year 1499 in France.

== Incumbents ==
- Monarch – Louis XII

== Events ==
- January 8 – Louis XII marries Anne of Brittany, in accordance with a law set by his predecessor, Charles VIII.
- February 9 – Treaty of Blois signed between France and Venice. This would lead to the Second Italian War
- March 16 – Louis XII establishes the Parlement de Normandie (Court of Exchequer) in Rouen, restructuring Normandy's judicial system into a permanent judicial institution.
- October 6 – Louis XII enters Milan
- October 25 – The Pont Notre-Dame in Paris, constructed under Charles VI of France, collapses into the Seine.
- November 5 – The Catholicon is published in Tréguier (Brittany). This Breton–French–Latin dictionary had been written in 1464 by Jehan Lagadeuc. It is the first dictionary of either French or Breton.

== Births ==
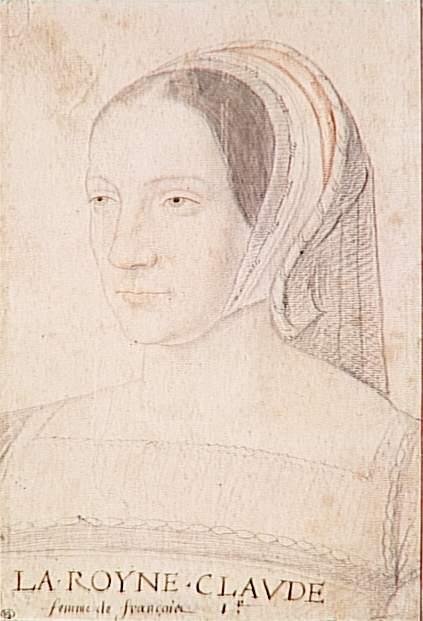
Claude of France

=== Full date missing ===
- Claude of France, queen consort (died 1524)
- Diane de Poitiers, noblewoman (died 1566)
- Gentian Hervetus, theologian, humanist and controversialist (died 1584)

== Deaths ==
=== Full date missing ===
- Jean Bilhères de Lagraulas, abbot, bishop and cardinal
