= 1491 in France =

- Decades: 1470s; 1480s; 1490s; 1500s; 1510s
- See also: History of France; Timeline of French history; List of years in France

Events from the year 1491 in France.

== Incumbents ==
- Monarch – Charles VIII ( As king), Anne of France (As regent-until 28 June)

== Events ==
- December 6 – King Charles VIII marries Anne of Britany, securing the duchy of Britany under French control.

== Births ==
- March 25 – Marie d'Albret, Countess of Rethel, French nobility (died October 27 1549)
- May 10 - Suzanne, Duchess of Bourbon, duchess (died April 28 1521)
- October 6 – Francis de Bourbon, Count of St. Pol, French noble (died September 1 1545)
- December 31 - Jacques Cartier, explorer (died September 1 1557)

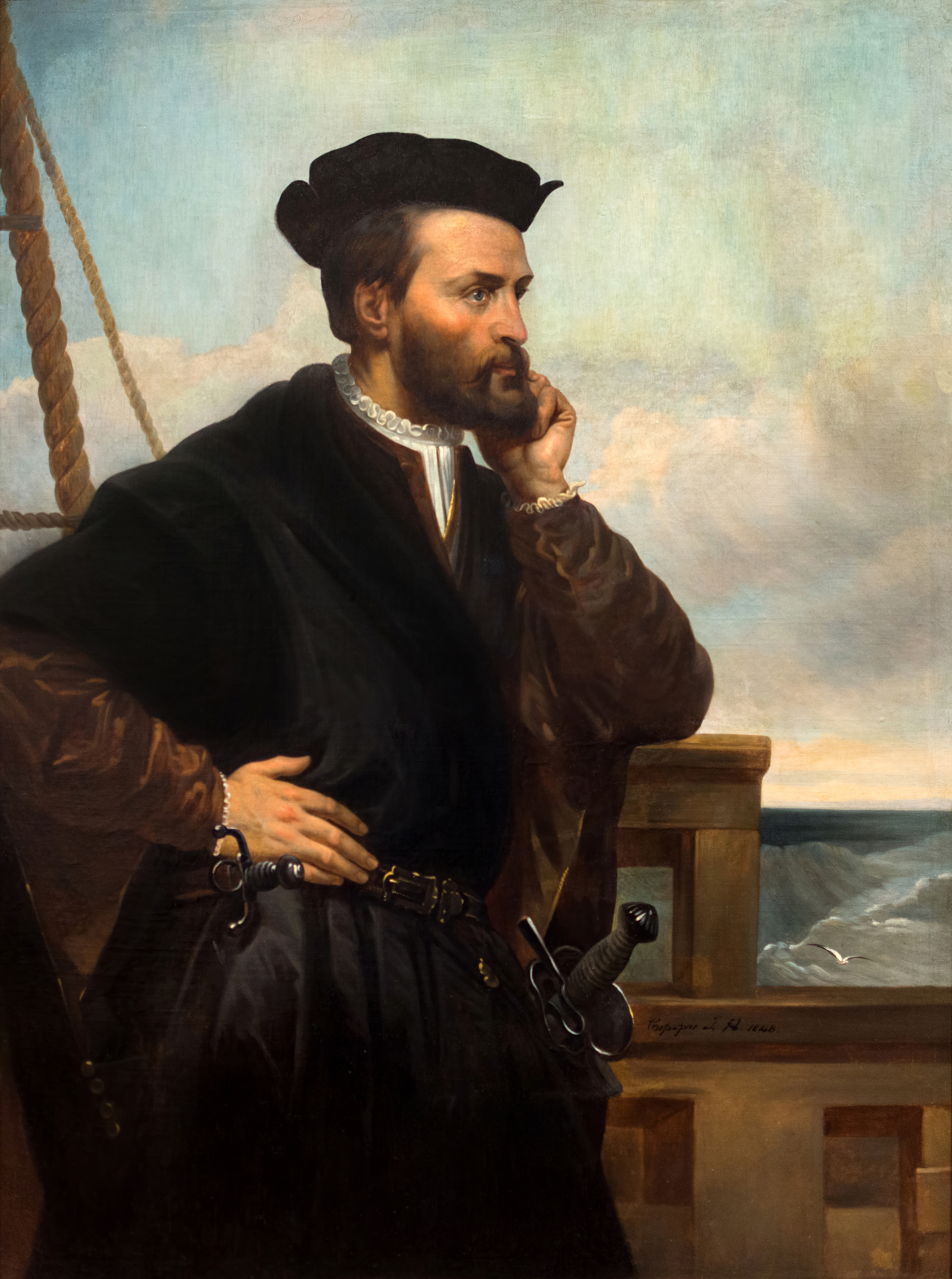
Jacques Cartier

== Deaths ==
=== Full date missing ===
- John II, Count of Nevers, nobleman (born 1415)
- Jean Balue, cardinal and minister (born c.1421)
- Philippe Basiron, composer, singer and organist (born c.1449)
- Thomas Basin, French historian and bishop (born c.1412)
