= 1505 in France =

- Decades: 1480s; 1490s; 1500s; 1510s; 1520s
- See also: History of France; Timeline of French history; List of years in France

Events from the year 1505 in France.

== Incumbents ==
- Monarch – Louis XII

== Events ==
- April – Due to King Louis XII's illness, he had his will changed to stipulate the betrothal of his daughter Claude to the heir to the French throne, Francis I. The betrothal became official the next year.
- October 15 – The second Treaty of Blois is signed in the aftermath of the Second Italian War of 1499–1503. In it, King Louis XII renounces his claims to Naples, on the condition that it be returned to French control if Germaine de Foix has no surviving children.

== Deaths ==
- February 4 – Joan of France, Catholic saint, Duchess of Berry and briefly Queen of France before her marriage to King Charles VIII was annulled (b. 1464).
