= 1501 in France =

- Decades: 1480s; 1490s; 1500s; 1510s; 1520s
- See also: History of France; Timeline of French history; List of years in France

Events from the year 1501 in France.

== Incumbents ==
- Monarch – Louis XII

== Events ==
- June 24 – Cesare Borgia's French troops storm and overtake the fortress at Capua in the Kingdom of Naples, overcoming the defence of Fabrizio Colonna in the occupation of the Iberian Crown of Aragon in southern Italy.
- July 25 – The Kingdom of Naples, led by King Federico I, surrenders to Cesare Borgia's French and Aragonese troops.
- August 2 – King Frederick of Naples abdicates upon the conquest of the Kingdom of Naples by France, and France's King Louis XII becomes the nominal monarch as Luigi II, re di Napoli. King Louis appoints Louis d'Armagnac, Duke of Nemours as France's Viceroy of Naples.
- October 13 – Maximilian of Austria and Louis XII of France sign the Treaty of Trente with Austria recognising all French conquests in the northern territories of Italy.

=== Date unknown ===
- Italic type (cut by Francesco Griffo) is first used by Aldus Manutius at the Aldine Press in Venice, in an edition of Virgil.

== Births ==
=== Date unknown ===
- probable
  - Hilaire Penet, French composer.
  - Claude d'Urfé, French royal official (d. 1558).

== Deaths ==
- May 22 – Robert Gaguin, French Renaissance humanist, philosopher and minister general of the Trinitarian Order (b. 1433/34).
- October 16 – Étienne de Vesc, courtier of Louis XI (b. c. 1445).

=== Date unknown ===
- Jean Michel, French dramatic poet (b. c. 1435).
