= 1485 in France =

- Decades: 1460s; 1470s; 1480s; 1490s; 1500s
- See also: History of France; Timeline of French history; List of years in France

Events from the year 1485 in France.

== Incumbents ==
- Monarch – Charles VIII ( As king), Anne of France (As regent)

== Events ==
- Louis XII, future king of France challenges the regency of Anne of France, starting the Mad war.

== Births ==
=== Full date missing ===
- Jean Duvet, engraver and goldsmith (died after 1561).
- Odet of Foix, Viscount of Lautrec, military leader (died 1528)
- Nicolas Bachelier, surveyor, architect and mason (died 1557)
- Antoine Vérard, publisher, bookmaker and bookseller (died 1512)
- Nicolau Chanterene, sculptor and architect (died 1551)

== Deaths ==
- 19 July – Pierre Landais, politician.(b.1430)

=== Full date missing ===
- Françoise d'Amboise (born 1427)
- André de Laval-Montmorency, Marshal of France (born c.1408)

== Links ==
Media related to 1485 in France at Wikimedia Commons
