= 1487 in France =

- Decades: 1460s; 1470s; 1480s; 1490s; 1500s
- See also: History of France; Timeline of French history; List of years in France

Events from the year 1487 in France.

== Incumbents ==
- Monarch – Charles VIII

== Events ==
- 19 March – Charles, Count of Angoulême surrenders during the Mad War
- Late May – 15,000 French troops enter Brittany as part of the French–Breton War.
- 6 August – King Charles VIII ends the siege of Nantes after seven weeks as part of the French–Breton War.
- Date unknown Pierre de Castelbajac appointed Bishop of Pamiers
- Date unknown – Consecration of Church of Saint-François-des-Cordeliers

== Births ==
- November – Anne Lascaris, Countess of Tende and Villars
- Date unknown – Yolande Louise of Savoy

== Deaths ==
- 19 January – Louis of Bourbon, Count of Roussillon
- 15 May – Margaret of Foix, Dutchess of Brittany (born c. 1449)
- 20 August – Jacques de Luxembourg, Seigneur de Richebourg
- 23 August – Marie of Cleves, Duchess of Orléans (born 1426)
- Date unknown – Catherine of Armagnac, daughter of Jacques d'Armagnac, dies whilst giving birth to the son of John II, Duke of Bourbon
- Date unknown – Guye de Wourey, dame de Fouchereau, wife of Guillaume de Rochefort
