= 1496 in France =

- Decades: 1470s; 1480s; 1490s; 1500s; 1510s
- See also: History of France; Timeline of French history; List of years in France

Events from the year 1496 in France.

== Incumbents ==
- Monarch – Charles VIII

== Events ==
- Date unknown – Philip II becomes Duke of Savoy
- Date unknown – Philip the Handsome marries Joanna of Castile

== Births ==
- 20 October – Claude, Duke of Guise
- 23 November – Clément Marot, poet
- Date unknown – Louise de Montmorency, aristocrat
- Date unknown – Anne de La Tour d'Auvergne, countess

== Deaths ==
- 1 January – Charles, Count of Angoulême (born 1459)
