= 1498 in France =

- Decades: 1470s; 1480s; 1490s; 1500s; 1510s
- See also: History of France; Timeline of French history; List of years in France

Events from the year 1498 in France.

== Incumbents ==
- Monarch – Charles VIII (until April 7), then Louis XII

== Events ==
- 27 May – Coronation of Louis XII

== Births ==
- 15 November – Eleanor of Austria, Queen consort of France. (d.1558)

=== Full date missing ===
- Madeleine de La Tour d'Auvergne (died 1519)
- François de Dinteville, bishop (died 1530)

== Deaths ==
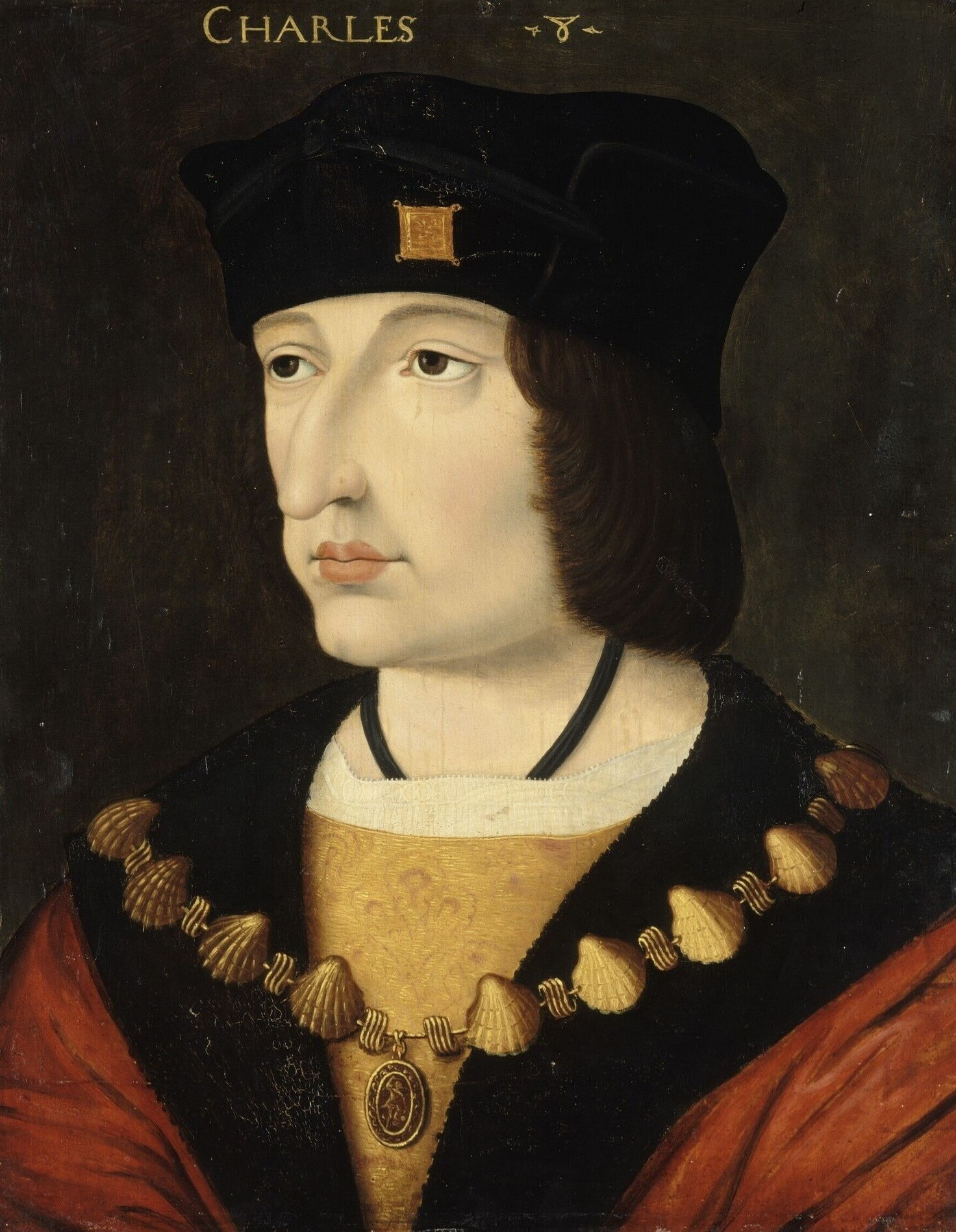
Charles VIII, King of France 1483–1498

- 7 April – Charles VIII of France (born 1470).

== Links ==
Media related to 1498 in France at Wikimedia Commons
