= Treaty of Frankfurt =

The Treaty of Frankfurt may refer to one of three treaties signed at Frankfurt, as follows:

- Treaty of Frankfurt (1489) – Treaty between Maximilian of Austria and the envoys of King Charles VIII of France
- Treaty of Frankfurt (1539) – Initiated a fifteen-month period of peace between Protestants and Catholics in the Holy Roman Empire
- Treaty of Frankfurt (1871) – Ended the Franco-Prussian War
