= 1486 in France =

- Decades: 1460s; 1470s; 1480s; 1490s; 1500s
- See also: History of France; Timeline of French history; List of years in France

Events from the year 1486 in France.

== Incumbents ==
- Monarch – Charles VIII

== Events ==
- June – Maximillian I of Austria continued his war against France after his newly gained territories due to his marriage to Mary of Burgundy, heiress to the Duchy of Burgundry, were threatened by her father and King of France, Charles the Bold, at the Battle of Nancy in January 5, 1477.
- November – The rebel François de Dunois seized the castle of Parthenay, following the internal unrest of the Mad War (la guerre folle), which began in 1485 and ended in 1488.

== Births ==
- 10 October – Charles III, Duke of Savoy
- Date uncertain – Charles de Garmont, Archbishop of Bordeaux

== Deaths ==
- 30 January – Jacques of Savoy, Count of Romont
- 2 September – Guy XIV de Laval
- Date uncertain – Nicolas Froment
- Date uncertain – Marguerite de Foix, Duchess of Britanny
