= 1497 in France =

- Decades: 1470s; 1480s; 1490s; 1500s; 1510s
- See also: History of France; Timeline of French history; List of years in France

Events from the year 1497 in France.

== Incumbents ==
- Monarch – Charles VIII

== Events ==
- 7 November – Philibert II becomes Duke of Savoy

== Births ==
- Date unknown – Jean Fernel, physician

== Deaths ==
- 6 February – Johannes Ockeghem, composer (b. c. 1410)
- 7 November – Philip II, Duke of Savoy (b. 1438)
