= 1509 in France =

- Decades: 1480s; 1490s; 1500s; 1510s; 1520s
- See also: History of France; Timeline of French history; List of years in France

List of events from the year 1509 in France.

== Incumbents ==
- Monarch – Louis XII

== Events ==
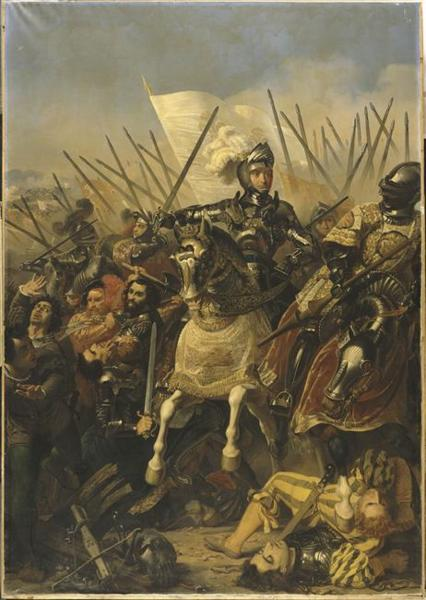
Battle of Agnadello, painting by Pierre-Jules Jollivet

- April 15 – The French army under the command of Louis XII leave Milan to invade Venetian territory. Part of the War of the League of Cambrai and the Italian Wars.
- May 9 – Louis XII and his army cross the Adda River at Cassano d'Adda.
- May 14 – Battle of Agnadello: French forces defeat the Venetians. The League of Cambrai occupies Venice's mainland territories.
- July 17 – French forces lose control of the city of Padua to the Venetians.
- August 8 – The French, along with support from the Holy Roman Empire, begin a siege of Padua that would last for months to retake the city.
- October 2 – The siege of Padua ends with Venetian victory, causing the retreat of HRE and French forces back to Tyrol and Milan.
- Aft. October 2 – French forces lose control of the city of Vicenza to the Venetians.

== Births ==
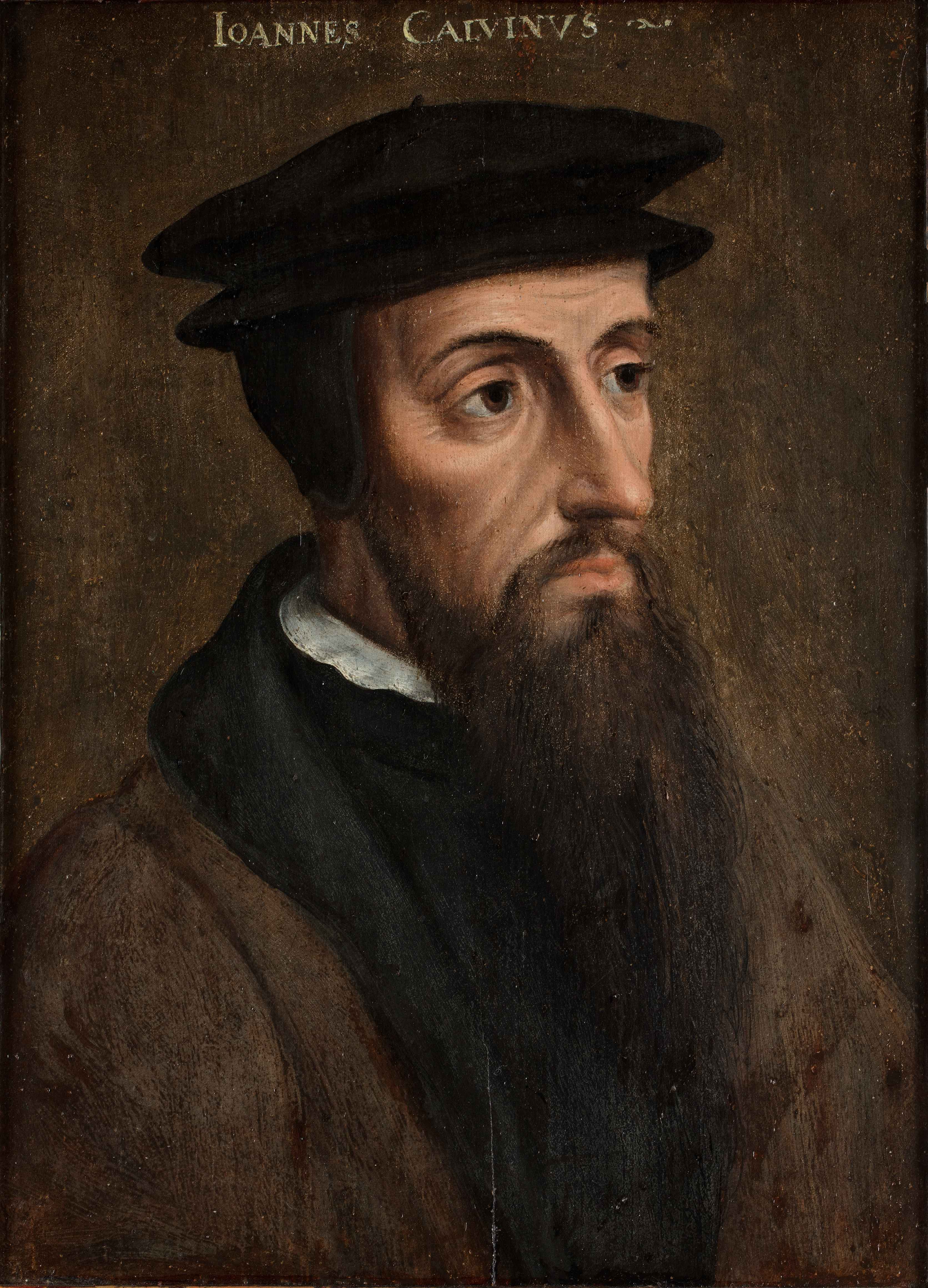
John Calvin

- July 10 – John Calvin, theologian, principal developer of the system later called Calvinism (d. 1564)
- August 3 – Étienne Dolet, scholar and printer (d. 1546)

=== Date unknown ===
- Antonio Gardano, composer (d. 1569)
- Élie Vinet, humanist (d. 1587)
- François Douaren, jurist (d. 1559)
- François de Scépeaux, governor (d. 1571)
- Gaspard de Saulx, military leader (d. 1573)
- Guillaume Le Testu, privateer (d. 1573)
- Valérand Poullain, Calvinist minister (d. 1557)

== Deaths ==
=== Date unknown ===
- Nephew of Philippe de Luxembourg (b. unknown)
