= 1512 in France =

- Decades: 1490s; 1500s; 1510s; 1520s; 1530s
- See also: History of France; Timeline of French history; List of years in France

Events from the year 1512 in France.

== Incumbents ==
- Monarch – Louis XII

== Events ==
- Ongoing since 1508 – War of the League of Cambrai
  - 10 August – The Battle of Saint-Mathieu, a naval battle between an English fleet of 25 ships and a Franco-Breton fleet of 22 ships.

== Births ==
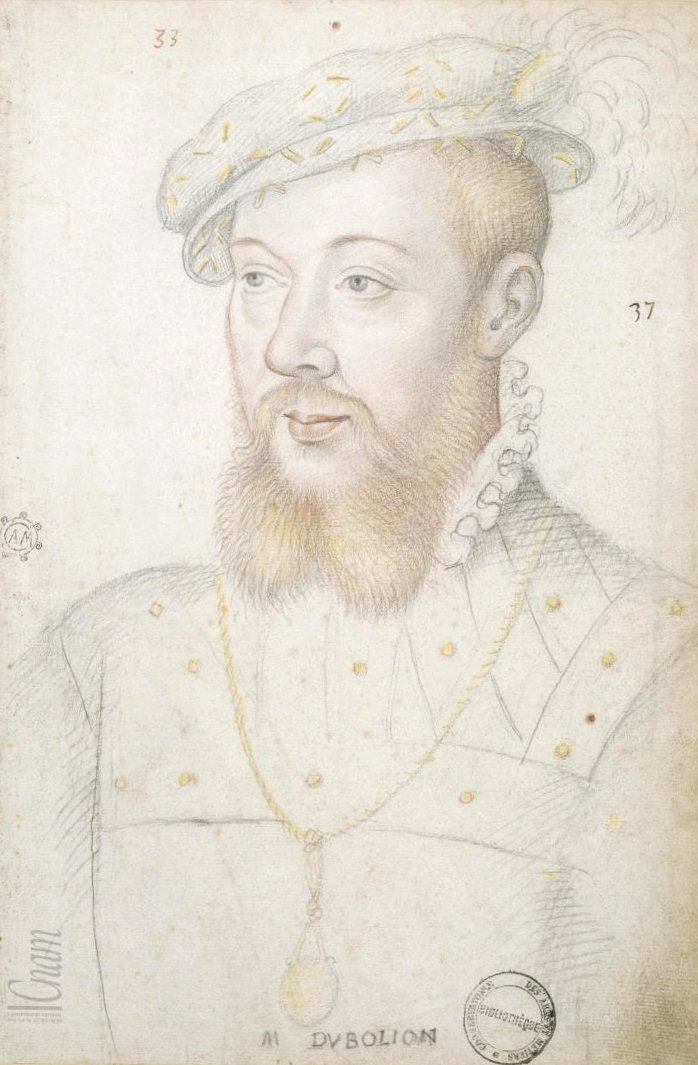
Robert IV de La Marck

- January 15 – Robert IV de La Marck, Duke of Bouillon, Seigneur of Sedan and a Marshal of France (d. 1556)

=== Date Unknown ===
- Thomas Sébillet, jurist, essayist and neo-Platonist grammarian (d. 1589)
- Charles de Sainte-Marthe, Protestant and theologian (d.1555)
- Antonio Lafreri, engraver, cartographer and publisher (d. 1577)

== Deaths ==
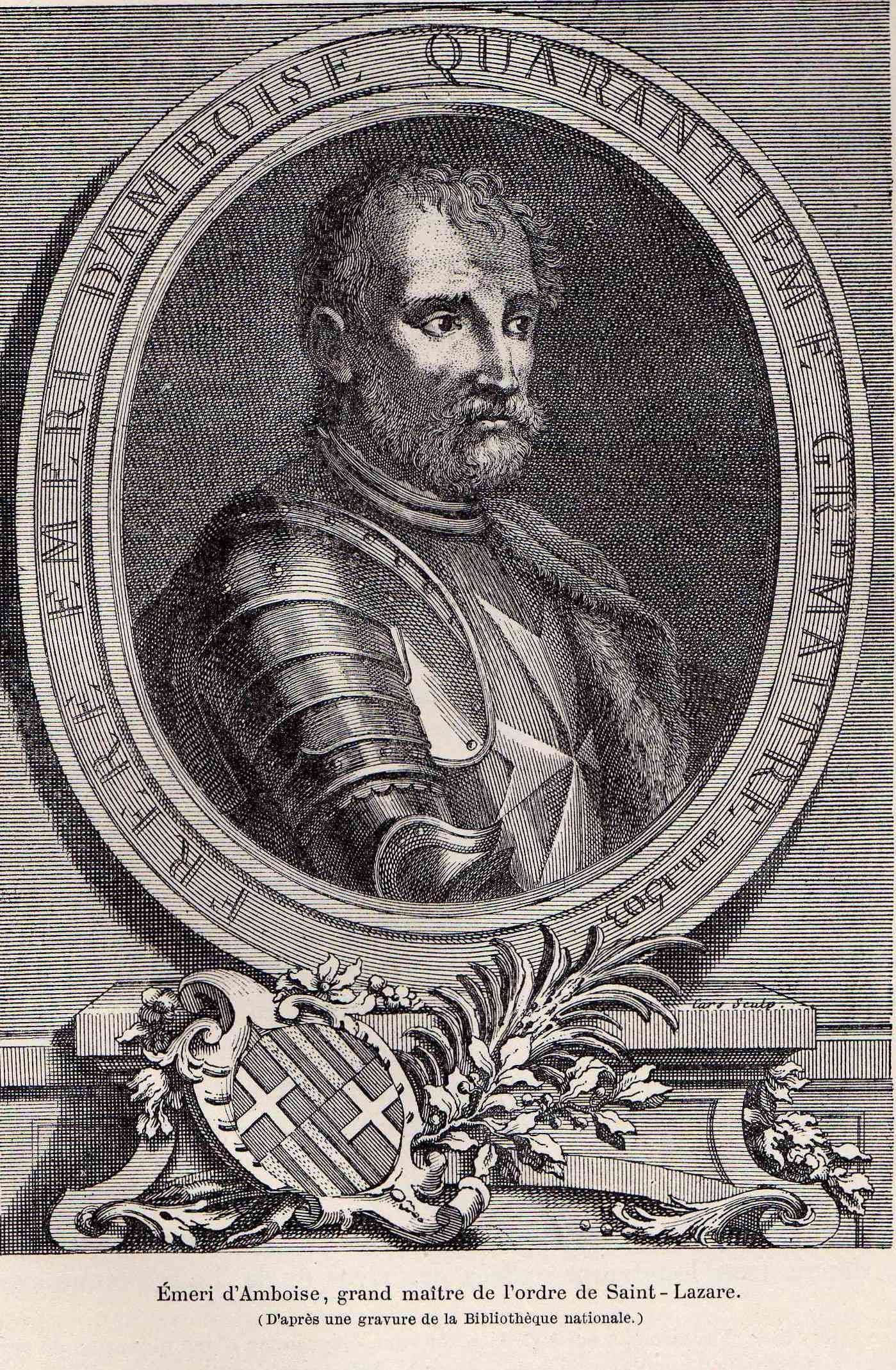
Emery d'Amboise

- January – Jean Braconnier, singer and composer (b. Unknown)
- July – Gilles Mureau, composer and singer (b. c. 1450)
- December 13 – Emery d'Amboise, Grand Master of the Knights Hospitaller (b. 1434)

=== Date Unknown ===
- Antoine Vérard, publisher, bookmaker and bookseller (b. before 1485)
