= 1490 in France =

- Decades: 1470s; 1480s; 1490s; 1500s; 1510s
- See also: History of France; Timeline of French history; List of years in France

Events from the year 1490 in France.

== Incumbents ==
- Monarch – Charles VIII ( As king), Anne of France (As regent)

== Events ==
- November – King Charles VIII orders the building of two ships (carracks),1000 tons each, as a counter to English ships being armed known as the "Regent" and the "Sovereign".

== Births ==
- 17 February – Charles III, Duke of Bourbon (d.1527)

=== Date Unknown ===
- Anne de Graville, poet.(c.1543)
