= 1488 in France =

- Decades: 1460s; 1470s; 1480s; 1490s; 1500s
- See also: History of France; Timeline of French history; List of years in France

Events from the year 1488 in France.

== Incumbents ==
- Monarch – Charles VIII (as king), Anne of France (as regent)

== Events ==
- January 20 – Louis II, Duke of Orléans and Francis II, Duke of Brittany are declared rebels by the Parlement of Paris.
- April 7 – Francis II ordered the muster of Breton troops in Rennes.
- April 15 – The French army laid siege to Châteaubriant. The city falls to the French on April 23.
- April 24 – A judgment of confiscation was declared against all the goods of Louis of Orléans.
- May 12/13 – Louis II de la Trémoille laid siege to Ancenis at night. The city falls to French artillery on May 19.
- July 12 –
  - The French army laid siege to Fougères. The city falls to the French on July 19.
  - French forces capture Dinan.
- July 28 – Breton and French armies met at the Battle of Saint-Aubin-du-Cormier. The Breton forces, led by Marshal de Rieux, are decisively beaten by the French. The defeat puts an end to the Mad War and a brief pause in the French–Breton War.
- August 20 – The Treaty of Sablé, also known as the "Treaty of le Verger" or "Treaty of the Orchard", is signed between Francis II of Brittany and King Charles VIII of France.

== Births ==
=== Date unknown ===
- Georges II d'Amboise, Roman Catholic bishop and cardinal (d. 1550)
- André Tiraqueau, jurist and politician (d. 1558).

== Deaths ==
- September 9 – Francis II, Duke of Brittany (b. 1433).

=== Date unknown ===
- Charles II, Duke of Bourbon and Archbishop of Lyon (b. 1433).
- Geoffroy Cœur, French nobleman.
