= 1493 in France =

- Decades: 1470s; 1480s; 1490s; 1500s; 1510s
- See also: History of France; Timeline of French history; List of years in France

Events from the year 1493 in France.

== Incumbents ==
- Monarch – Charles VIII

== Events ==
- 19 January – Treaty of Barcelona is signed between France, King Ferdinand II of Aragon and Queen Isabella of Castile.
- 23 May – Treaty of Senlis is signed between France and Maximilian of Austria.

== Births ==
- 2 January – Louis de Bourbon-Vendôme, prince and religious leader.(d.1557)

=== Date Unknown ===
- Charles de Hémard de Denonville, Catholic bishop.(d.1540)

== Deaths ==
- Marie of Orléans, Countess of Étampes and Viscountess of Narbonne.(b.1457)
