= 1511 in France =

- Decades: 1490s; 1500s; 1510s; 1520s; 1530s
- See also: History of France; Timeline of French history; List of years in France

List of events from the year 1511 in France.

== Incumbents ==
- Monarch – Louis XII

== Events ==
- February 14 – The League of Cambrai is dissolved as Spain and the Holy Roman Empire withdraw and ally against the Kingdom of France.
- May 23 – French troops capture the Italian city of Bologna after a two-day battle.
- Late May – French troops recaptured Mirandola
- October 1 – During the War of the League of Cambrai Pope Julius II proclaims a Holy League against French dominance in Italy.
- November 17 – The Treaty of Westminster creates an alliance between Henry VIII of England and Ferdinand II of Aragon against France.

== Births ==
- June 4 – Honorat II of Savoy, French Navy admiral (d. 1580)
- August 24 – Jean Bauhin, French physician (d. 1582)

== Deaths ==
=== Date unknown ===
- probable – Antoine de Févin, French composer (b. c. 1470)
