= 1503 in France =

- Decades: 1480s; 1490s; 1500s; 1510s; 1520s
- See also: History of France; Timeline of French history; List of years in France

Events from the year 1503 in France.

== Incumbents ==
- Monarch – Louis XII

== Events ==
- February 13 – Challenge of Barletta: Thirteen Italian knights defeat thirteen French knights in a duel, near Barletta.
- February 23 – French–Spanish Wars in Italy – Battle of Ruvo: The Spanish defeat the French.
- April 21
  - Battle of Seminara: Spanish forces under Fernando de Andrade de las Mariñas defeat the French under Bernard Stewart, 4th Lord of Aubigny.
  - Battle of Cerignola: Spanish forces under Gonzalo Fernández de Córdoba defeat the French under Louis d'Armagnac, Duke of Nemours.
- August 18 – Seven French cardinals are called to Rome for a papal conclave, to start in September following the death of Pope Alexander VI.
- November 11 – Bernard Stewart, 4th Lord of Aubigny, commander of the defeated French forces and a prisoner of war since his April 21 defeat at the Battle of Seminara, is released from Castel Nuovo in Naples after a truce between France and Spain.
- December 29 – The Battle of Garigliano takes place near Gaeta in Italy. Spanish forces under Gonzalo Fernández de Córdoba defeat a French–Italian mercenary army under Ludovico II, Marquess of Saluzzo.

== Births ==
- December 14 – Michel de Nostredame, called Nostradamus, French physician, astrologer and writer of Les Propheties (1555) (d. 1566)

=== Date unknown ===
- Jean Suau, French Roman Catholic bishop and cardinal (d. 1566)
- Robert Estienne, French printer (d. 1559)
- probable – Nicholas Bourbon, French poet.

== Deaths ==
- April 28 – Louis d'Armagnac, Duke of Nemours, French nobleman, politician and military commander (b. 1472).
- July 24 – Louise of Savoy, member of French royal family and a Poor Clare nun (b. 1461).

=== Date unknown ===
- Jean Poyer, French painter (b. unknown).
