= 1508 in France =

- Decades: 1480s; 1490s; 1500s; 1510s; 1520s
- See also: History of France; Timeline of French history; List of years in France

Events from the year 1508 in France.

== Incumbents ==
- Monarch – Louis XII

== Events ==
- October 24 – King Louis XII convenes court at the Parlement de Normandie building in Rouen.
- December 10 – The League of Cambrai is formed as an alliance against the Republic of Venice, between Pope Julius II, Louis XII of France, Maximilian I, Holy Roman Emperor and Ferdinand II of Aragon.

== Births ==
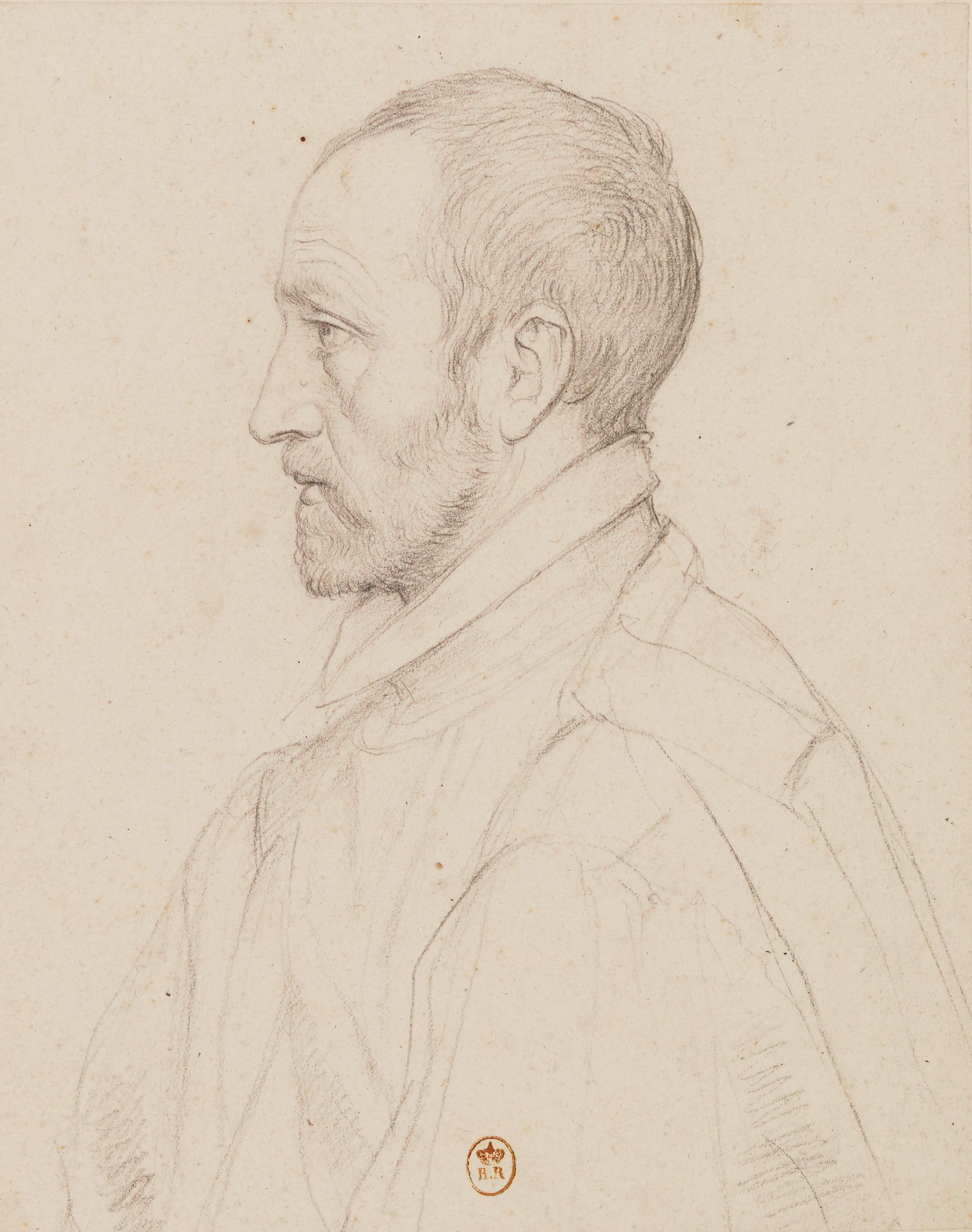
Early modern period portrait of Jean Daurat

- April 3 – Jean Daurat, French writer and scholar (d. 1588).

=== Date unknown ===
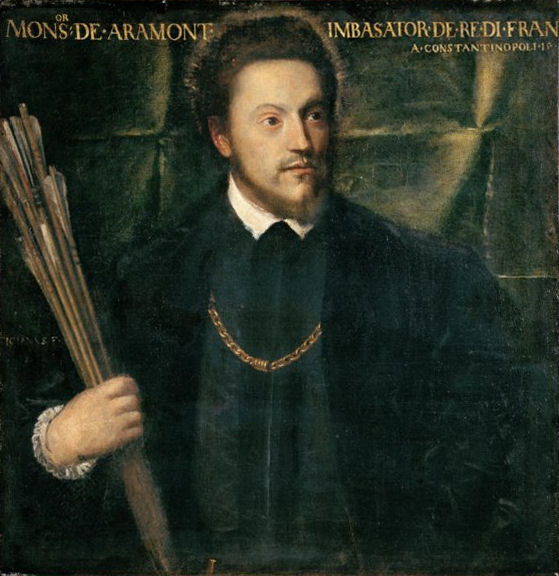
Portrait of ambassador to the Ottoman Porte Gabriel de Luetz d'Aramont, by Titian, 1541–1542, oil on canvas, 76 x 74 cm.

- François Connan, French jurist (d. 1551).
- Lancelot de Carle, Bishop of Riez, scholar, poet and diplomat (d. 1568).
- Gabriel de Luetz, Baron and Lord of Aramon and Vallabrègues, French Ambassador to the Ottoman Empire (d. 1553).
- Jean de Monluc, French clergyman and diplomat (d. 1579).
- Anne de Pisseleu d'Heilly, Chief mistress of Francis I of France (d. 1580).
- Georges de Selve, French scholar, diplomat and ecclesiastic (d. 1541).
- Jérôme Souchier, French Roman Catholic cardinal (d. 1577).

== Deaths ==
- May 13 – Martial d'Auvergne, French poet (b. 1420). - June 15 – Bernard Stewart, 3rd Lord of Aubigny, French general, commander of the Garde Écossaise, and diplomat (b. c. 1452). - October 10 – Pierre II d'Urfé, French lord (b. unknown).

=== Date unknown ===
- Palamède de Forbin, seigneur of Solliès (b. unknown). - René II, Duke of Lorraine (b. 1451).
