= 1510 in France =

- Decades: 1490s; 1500s; 1510s; 1520s; 1530s
- See also: History of France; Timeline of French history; List of years in France

List of events from the year 1510 in France.

== Incumbents ==
- Monarch – Louis XII

== Events ==
- June – The Ordinances of Lyon are issued by king Louis XII, which included a range of bureaucratic changes especially in regard to the papal authority in France.
- August 16 – All French subjects were forbidden from visiting the court of Rome, by edict from king Louis XII.

== Births ==
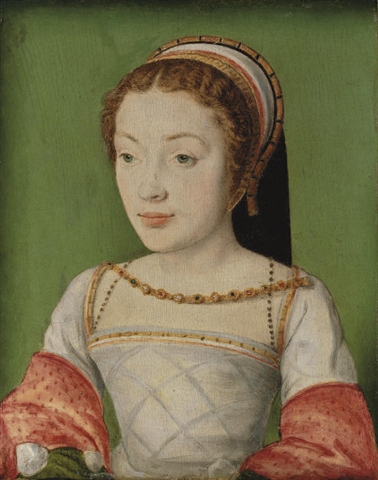
Princess Renée of France

- March 25 – Guillaume Postel, French linguist, diplomat and scholar (d. 1581)
- October 25 – Renée of France, daughter of king Louis XII and Duchess of Ferrara by marriage (d. 1574)

== Deaths ==
- January 5 – Pierre Carré Bishop of Orange (b.1484)
- May 25 – Georges d'Amboise, French cardinal and politician. (b. 1460)
