= Gérard Gobaille =

French bishop

Gérard Gobaille (died 12 September 1494, Melun) was a French bishop.

== Life ==
He was born in Soissons to a silk merchant. He became a bachelor of law in 1455 and in 1463 became canon and treasurer of Soissons Cathedral. He was elected advocate to the Parlement of Paris in 1488 and was elected bishop of Paris and canon of the cathedral on 8 August 1492 after six votes, against the wishes of Charles VIII of France - however, his election was never confirmed by the pope. He is buried in Notre Dame Cathedral.
