= 1506 in France =

- Decades: 1480s; 1490s; 1500s; 1510s; 1520s
- See also: History of France; Timeline of French history; List of years in France

Events from the year 1506 in France.

== Incumbents ==
- Monarch –Louis XII

== Events ==
- May 14 – Theologian Thomas Bricot awarded King Louis XII the honorary title of "Father of the People – Le Père du Peuple" during an assembly of the Estates at Plessis.

== Births ==
- April 13 – Peter Faber, French Catholic priest and co-founder of the Society of Jesus (d. 1546).

=== Date unknown ===
- Michel de l'Hôpital – French diplomat and chancellor (d. 1573).
