= 1507 in France =

- Decades: 1480s; 1490s; 1500s; 1510s; 1520s
- See also: History of France; Timeline of French history; List of years in France

Events from the year 1507 in France.

== Incumbents ==
- Monarch – Louis XII

== Events ==
- March 28 – The revolutionary council of the Republic of Genoa declares war against French invaders.
- April 29 – French troops retake the city of Genoa after a seven-day siege, defeating rebels who had taken control in July 1506.
- May 14 – In Italy, King Louis XII departs from Genoa and makes a triumphant entry into Milan on May 24.
- June 28 – King Ferdinand II of Aragon is welcomed by Louis XII at the Italian city of Savona in a spectacular ceremony, and the two monarchs begin a series of meetings on the division of the Italian kingdoms between France and Spain.
- July 3 – King Ferdinand II of Aragon and King Louis XII of France complete their six-day summit at Savona.

== Births ==
- September 27 – Guillaume Rondelet, French physician (d. 1566).

=== Date unknown ===
- Juan de Juni, sculptor (d. 1577).

== Deaths ==
- June 19 – Jean-François de la Trémoille, French Roman Catholic bishop and cardinal (b. 1465).
- August 23 – Jean Molinet, French writer (b. 1435).
