= Valet de chambre =

Position in a royal or noble household

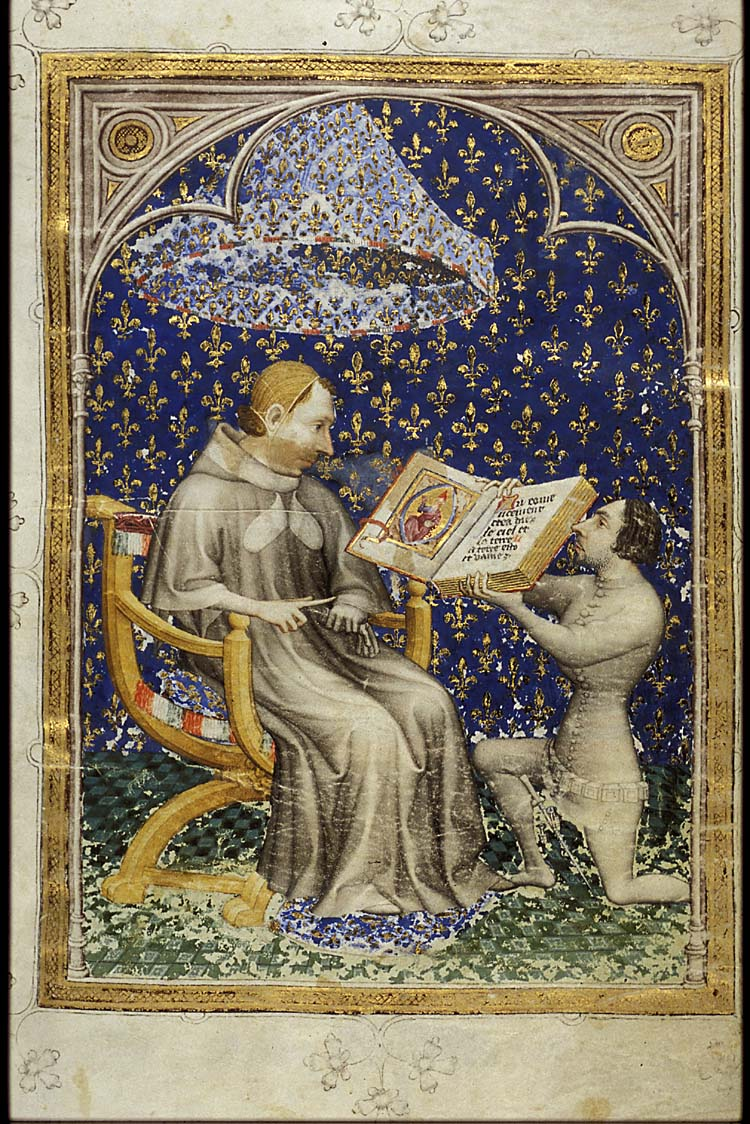
Jean de Vaudetar, valet to King Charles V of France, presents the king with his gift of an illuminated manuscript by Jean Bondol, who was also a valet de chambre, in 1372. Vaudetar was a nobleman, already in charge of the Louvre palace, who was to progress further at court.

Valet de chambre (French pronunciation: [valɛ də ʃɑ̃bʁ]), or varlet de chambre, was a court appointment introduced in the late Middle Ages, common from the 14th century onwards. Royal households had many persons appointed at any time. While some valets simply waited on the patron, or looked after his clothes and other personal needs, itself potentially a powerful and lucrative position, others had more specialized functions. At the most prestigious level it could be akin to a monarch or ruler's personal secretary, as was the case of Anne de Montmorency at the court of Francis I of France. For noblemen pursuing a career as courtiers, like Étienne de Vesc, it was a common early step on the ladder to higher offices.

For some this brought entry into the lucrative court business of asking for favours on behalf of clients, and passing messages to the monarch or lord heading the court. Valets might supply specialized services of various kinds to the patron, as artists, musicians, poets, scholars, librarians, doctors or apothecaries and curators of collections. Valets comprised a mixture of nobles hoping to rise in their career, and those—often of humble origin—whose specialized abilities the monarch wanted to use or reward.

The title of valet enabled access to the monarch or other employer; the "chambre" originally referred to rooms such as the throne room, or the Privy chamber where the ruler conducted his more private meetings, but services extended to the bedroom as well. Sometimes, as in Spain and England, different bodies of valets were responsible for the bedroom and the daytime rooms. Often, the moment the ruler went outdoors a whole new division of staff took over.

From the late 14th century onwards the term is found in connection with an artist, author, architect, or musician's position within a noble or royal circle, with painters increasingly receiving the title as the social prestige of artists became increasingly distinct from that of craftsmen. The benefits for the artist were a position of understood status in the court hierarchy, with a salary, livery clothes to wear (in the early period at least), the right to meals at the palace, often in a special mess-room, and benefits such as exclusion from local guild regulations, and, if all went well, a lifetime pension. The valet would frequently be housed, at least when working in the palace, but often permanently. Lump-sums might be paid to the valet, especially to provide a dowry for a daughter; sons were often able to join the court as well.

== National terms ==
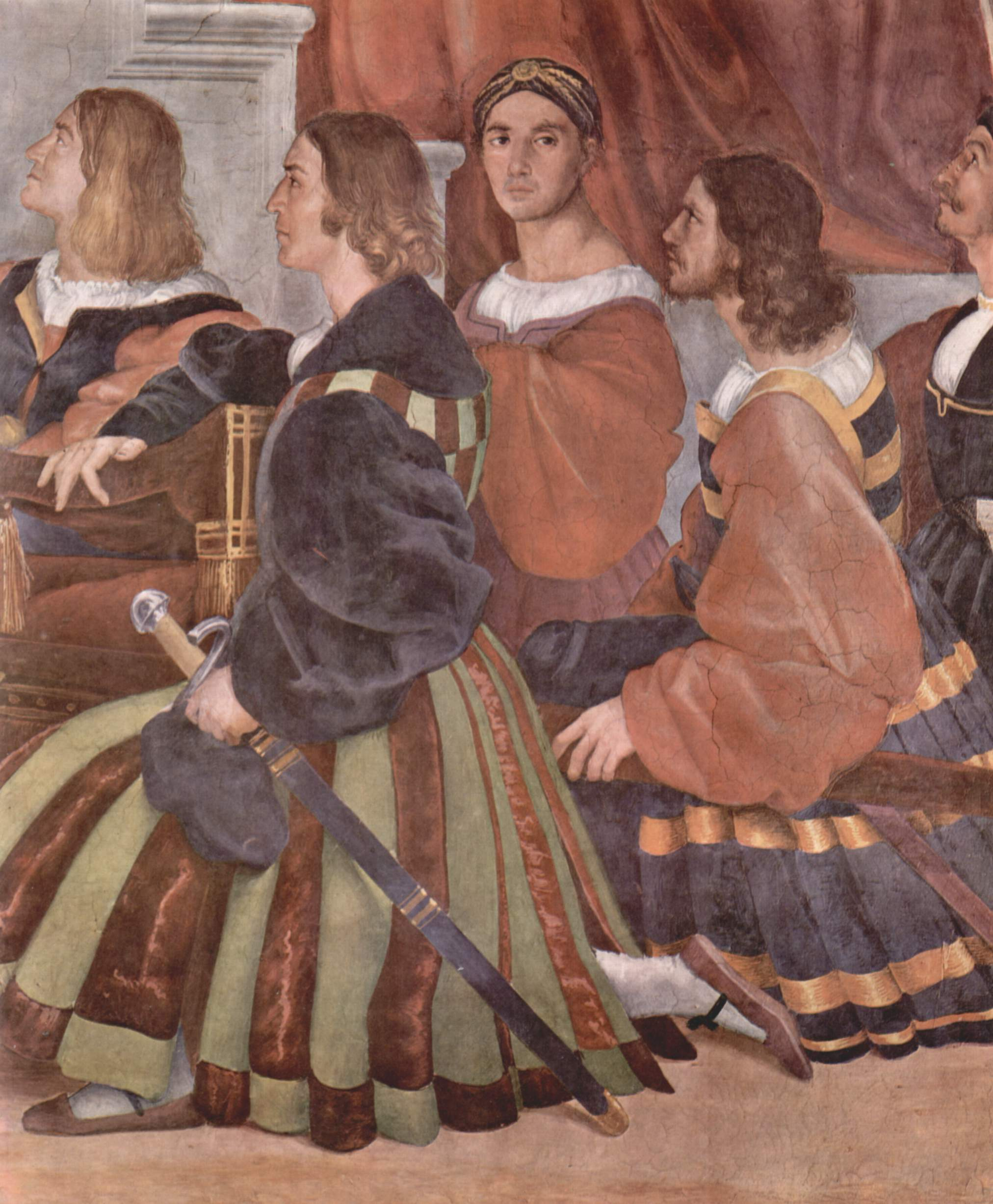
Papal valets kneel during The Mass at Bolsena by Raphael, himself a Papal valet who may himself be here, looking at the viewer

In the English Royal Household the French term was used, whilst French was the language of the court, for example for Geoffrey Chaucer in the 1370s; but subsequently titles such as Groom of the Chamber, Groom of the Stool, and Groom of the Robes were used for people with different responsibilities. The "Grooms of the Privy Chamber" and of the "Stool" were more important posts because they involved closer access and were usually held by the well-born, often knights. The "Groom-Porter"'s job was to "regulate all matters to do with gaming" at court, providing the cards, and settling disputes.

Other countries used other terms: in Italian usually cameriere, in German-speaking courts Kammerjunker or Hofjunker were the usual titles, though it was Kammerer in the Austrian Habsburg court, and Kammerherr in Bavaria. In Russia Stolnik was broadly equivalent, until Peter the Great introduced new titles in 1722, after which the Камер-юнкер or kammerjunker came 11th out of 14 in the Table of Ranks. "Valet de chambre" also became used outside courts to refer to normal manservants.

== Valets from the arts ==
Probable self-portrait of Jan van Eyck painted in 1433. He became a valet in 1425, at a very high salary, and remained one until his death. He was also used as a diplomat, and once performed a pilgrimage on behalf of his Duke.

The patron retained the services of the valet de chambre-artist or musician, sometimes exclusively, but often not. The degree to which valets with special skills were expected to perform the normal serving tasks of valets no doubt varied greatly, and remains obscure from at least the earlier records. Probably many were expected to be on hand for service on major occasions, but otherwise not often. The appointment gave the artist a place in the court management structure, under such officials as the Lord Chamberlain in England, or the Grand Master of France, usually via an intermediate court officer. In turn the valets were able to give orders to the huissiers or ushers, footmen, pages, and other ordinary servants.

There were some female equivalents, such as the portrait miniaturist Levina Teerlinc (daughter of Simon Bening), who served as a gentlewoman in the royal households of both Mary I and Elizabeth I, and Sofonisba Anguissola, who was court painter to Philip II of Spain and art tutor with the rank of lady-in-waiting to his third wife Elisabeth of Valois, a keen amateur artist. During the Renaissance, the regularly required artistic roles in music and painting typically began to be given their own offices and titles, as Court painter, Master of the King's Music and so forth, and the valets mostly reverted to looking after the personal, and often the political, needs of their patron. In fact Jan van Eyck, one of the many artists and musicians with the rank of valet in the Burgundian court, was already described as a painter as well as a valet.

In England the artists of the Tudor court, as well as the musicians, had other dedicated offices to fill, so that artistic valets or Grooms were mainly literary or dramatic. But these included whole companies of actors, who in practice seem to have gone their own way outside their performances, except for being drafted in to help on specially busy occasions. In August 1604 the King's Men, presumably including Shakespeare, were "waiting and attending" upon the Spanish ambassador at Somerset House, "on his Majesty's service", no doubt in connection with the Somerset House Conference, then negotiating a treaty with Spain — but no plays were performed. Over the previous Christmas, the whole company had been housed at Hampton Court Palace, several miles outside London, for three weeks, in the course of which they gave seven performances.

Some courtier artists took their courtly careers very seriously. Geoffrey Chaucer held a number of roles as a diplomat and what we would now call a civil servant. Diego Velázquez was appointed "King's painter" in 1623, at the age of 24, and held this position until his death at the age of 61. In addition, he progressed through the hierarchy of courtiers as "usher in the royal chamber" in 1627 (equivalent to valet de chambre), "Assistant in the Wardrobe" (1636) and "Assistant in the Privy Chamber" (ayuda de cámera) in 1643. These appointments put him in the "select group" of some 350 top royal servants, out of about 1,700 in total, and probably used up much of his time. In fact Velázquez perhaps saw more of the King than any other servants, as Philip spent long hours in his studio watching him paint. Finally, after the King's first application on his behalf was rejected, and some probable falsification of his family background and career, Velázquez managed in 1659 to obtain entry to the chivalric Order of Santiago, the pinnacle of his courtly ambitions.

== In the Baroque court ==
When Jean Poquelin arranged for his 18-year-old son, better known as the dramatist Molière, to follow in his footsteps as one of the eight "Tapissiers ordinaires de la chambre du Roi", with a valet de chambre's rank, he had to pay 1,200 livres. But the title required only 3 months' work a year, looking after the royal furniture and tapestries, for a salary of 300 livres, with the opportunity to take commission on a number of lucrative contracts. Poquelin senior ran his successful shop in Paris when not on royal duty. Molière retained the office of valet until his death. The court duties of many valets, specialized or otherwise, followed regular cycles, rotating every quarter between four holders.

Alexandre Bontemps, head of the thirty-six functional ordinary valets de chambre of Louis XIV of France, was a powerful and feared figure, in charge of the troops guarding the royal palaces, and an elaborate network of spies on courtiers. Major courts had a higher layer of courtier attendants, always from the upper nobility, whose French version was the Gentleman of the bedchamber (four, rotating annually), and in England Lord of the Bedchamber. At the increasingly formalized ceremony of the Levée the clothes of the monarch would be passed by the valet to the Gentleman, who would pass it to, or place it on, the monarch himself. Especially in France, several other members of the royal family had their own households, with their own corps of valets.

During the Baroque age the role of valet largely ceased to be a career step for noble courtiers aiming for the highest offices, although the Premier Valets of the Kings of France, now a role usually passing from father to son, were themselves ennobled and wealthy. Livery clothes and the right to meals were converted into extra cash payments by several courts. Constant, valet de chambre to Napoleon I, was one of many who published their memoirs, from the 18th century on. Especially in German lands, honorary titles as kammerer and the variants were now given, mostly to noblemen, with great freedom, but with no payment or services being exchanged; both Vienna and Munich had over 400 by the 18th century.

== Notable holders of the office ==
=== Artists ===
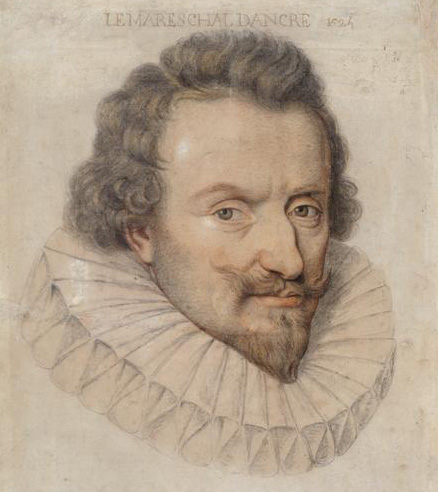
Portrait of Concino Concini, a favourite who probably began as valet de chambre to Maria de Medici, by Daniel Dumonstier, also a valet de chambre.

Mainly painters, unless otherwise stated.

- Jacques de Baerze, woodcarver to Philip the Good.
- David Beck (1621–1656), portraitist, valet de chambre to Christina of Sweden
- Henri Bellechose
- Hue de Boulogne, one of many painter-valets in the Burgundian accounts of Duke Philip the Bold.
- Jean Bondol, artist from Bruges, recruited by the French court, now best known as an illuminator (see picture), and for the design of the Apocalypse tapestries at Angers.
- Jean Bourdichon, most famous as an illuminator.
- Melchior Broederlam
- François Clouet, French portraitist, like his father
- Jean Clouet
- Jean de Court, painter and valet to Mary, Queen of Scots
- Daniel Dumonstier (1574-1645 or 46), French portraitist and collector.
- Barthélemy d'Eyck, to René of Anjou
- Hubert van Eyck
- Jan van Eyck
- Bartolomeo Ghetti, Italian who worked for Francis I of France
- Gerard Horenbout, illuminator
- Paul de Limbourg – Illuminator
- Gerard Loyet
- Jean Malouel
- Philippe de Mazerolles, Frenchman appointed as Burgundian court illuminator, possibly identical with the Master of Anthony of Burgundy
- Jean Nocret
- Jean Perréal, also a sculptor and architect.
- Raphael was a papal valet
- Claus Sluter, sculptor, also succeeded his master Jean de Marville
- Bartholomeus Spranger for Rudolf II, Holy Roman Emperor
- Robinet Testard – Illuminator
- Georges Trubert, illuminator for René of Anjou.
- Willem van Vleuten goldsmith to Philip the Good.
- Klaas van der Werve sculptor to Philip the Good.

Similar court positions were held by many court painters, notably Andrea Mantegna and Diego Velázquez.

=== Musicians ===
- Adrien Basin
- Baltasar de Beaujoyeulx, virtuoso violinist and master of ceremonies for Catherine de' Medici's court festivals, he created the Ballet Comique de la Reine, the first ballet.
- Heinrich Ignaz Franz Biber, in 1668 began his career at 24 as valet de chambre for the Bishop of Olomouc, before progressing to Imperial service and a knighthood.
- Antoine Busnois
- Hayne van Ghizeghem
- Pieter van Maldere appointed as late as 1758
- Marco Marazzoli Roman composer, aiutante di camera to Cardinal Antonio Barberini, later cameriere extra to Pope Alexander VII.
- Julien Perrichon
- Thomas Purcell, English singer, violist, and minor composer, probably uncle of Henry Purcell, was Groom of the Robes from 1661, eventually holding seven court posts simultaneously, mostly musical, but also as "underhousekeeper" at Somerset House.
- Johannes Tapissier
- Jacobus Vide

=== Literary men and actors ===
- George Bryan Elizabethan actor with the Lord Chamberlain's Men, who seems to have become a regular Groom of the Chamber on his retirement from the stage - or perhaps that was just a way of giving him a pension.
- Geoffrey Chaucer, poet and courtier, became a page to the king's daughter-in-law in his early teens, and married one of the Queen's ladies-in-waiting; he progressed to higher offices at court.
- Charles Rivière Dufresny, dramatist
- Stephen Hawes, poet and Groom of the Chamber in 1502, under Henry VII.
- Thomas Heywood, playwright and producer. With several of his actors became Groom of the Queen's Chamber for Elizabeth I of England
- The King's Men, the playing company under James I and Charles I of England, were "grooms extraordinary of the chamber".
- Clément Marot, poet, and his father Jean (below). Like Thomas Sternhold (see below) he published an influential vernacular verse translation of the Psalms.
- Jean Marot poet, and secretary (escripvain) to Anne of Brittany.
- Molière, who began his career following his father (also a valet de chambre), as a tapissier valet, looking after the royal tapestries and furniture, before going into acting and becoming court dramatist.
- Bonaventure des Périers, author and secretary to Marguerite de Navarre
- William Shakespeare, as a key member of the Lord Chamberlain's Men and later the King's Men, had this status as part of the English habit of making the whole of court theatrical companies Grooms of the Chamber. He occasionally participated in great ceremonial occasions, wearing livery at James I's royal entry to London in 1604.
- Thomas Sternhold, translator of the Metrical Psalms, and Groom of the Robes to Henry VIII and Edward VI.

=== Other specialists ===
- Marin le Bourgeoys (c. 1550–1634) French gunsmith, inventor (or perfector) of the flintlock mechanism firing action.

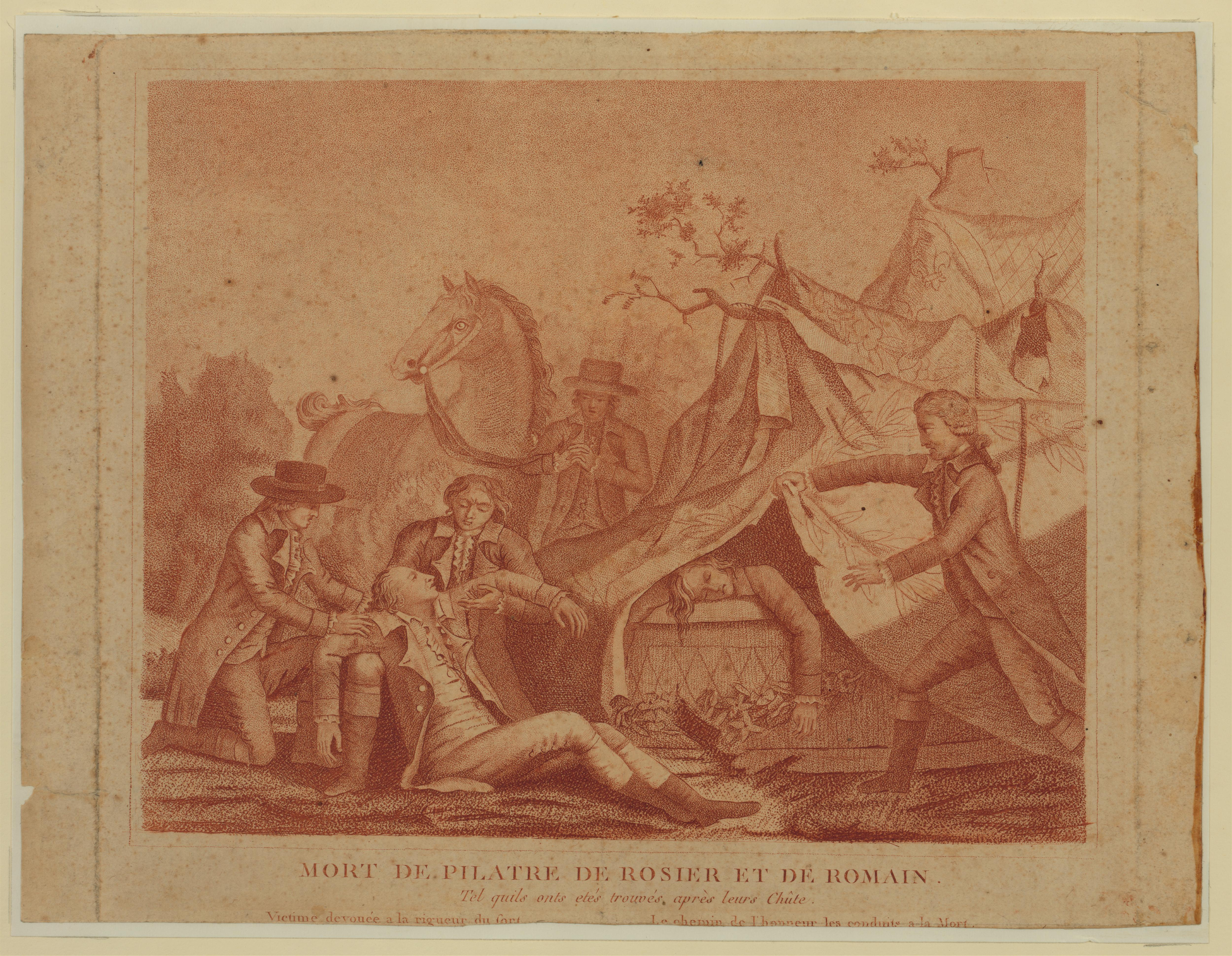
Jean-François Pilâtre de Rozier and his companion Romain become the first to die in an aviation accident at Wimereux, on the 15 June 1785.

- Jean-Baptiste Baillon III, (d. 1772), French clockmaker
- Court Jews, usually either physicians or financiers, were often appointed, especially in the German lands.
- Nicholas Fleury, embroiderer to Henry IV of France
- Jean-Roland Malet, economist
- Balthazar Martinot (1636-1714) French clockmaker.
- Jean-François Pilâtre de Rozier scientist, balloonist and curator; the first person to make an untethered balloon flight (in the presence of the king), and two years later the first person to die in an aviation accident.
- Andries van Vesel, apothecary to the Holy Roman Emperors, and father of the great anatomist Vesalius
- Jehan du Vivier, French royal goldsmith, paid in 1390 for a reliquary.

=== Courtiers, soldiers and politicians ===
In fact the majority of valets fell under this category in the earlier period. All these appear to have had functional, rather than purely honorary, positions.

- Sir John Donne (1420s-1503, Welsh Yorkist soldier, diplomat and courtier, made Usher of the Chamber in 1461, on Edward IV's accession, then Esquire of the Body 1465–69
- Friedrich von Canitz (1654–99), Prussian diplomat who entered court as a Kammerjunker. His poems were published posthumously.
- Adolph Freiherr Knigge (1752–96), statesman, author, and leading Freemason.
- Anne de Montmorency, at the start of his very distinguished career
- Sir Henry Neville was made Groom of the Privy Chamber 1546, five years after being knighted, then Gentleman of the Privy Chamber in 1550, and Member of Parliament for Berkshire five times, from 1553- 1584. A typical moderately successful courtier's career.
- Sir Henry Norreys, a Groom of the Stool (an especially intimate role) under Henry VIII, was executed for an alleged affair with Queen Anne Boleyn, along with William Brereton, a Groom of the Privy Chamber.
- Jean de Saint Yon
- Pierre Sala, (1457-1529) French courtier and poet
- Veit Ludwig von Seckendorff (1626–92), scholar and statesman, a protege of Ernest I, Duke of Saxe-Gotha who made him hofjunker after university. He wrote an influential work on the administration of small principalities.
- Ludwig von Siegen, aristocratic soldier and amateur artist, who invented the mezzotint. In the small court of the Landgrave of Hesse-Kassel, then a minor, his title of kammerjunker seems to have equated in fact to Chamberlain and head of the palace guards.
- Étienne de Vesc
- Mikhail Illarionovich Vorontsov (1714-1767), Russian diplomat and statesman, made kammerjunker at the age of 14, his career took off after he helped Elizabeth of Russia in her coup d'etat of 1741.
- Christian Frederik von Schalburg (1906-1942), Danish officer who was born in tzarist Russia and fell on the Eastern Front, used the title kammerjunker from 1936 where he served in the Royal Danish Life Guards.

== See also ==
- Artists of the Tudor Court
- Esquire of the Body
- Groom in Waiting
- Papal Gentlemen
