= 1513 in France =

- Decades: 1490s; 1500s; 1510s; 1520s; 1530s
- See also: History of France; Timeline of French history; List of years in France

Events from the year 1513 in France.

== Incumbents ==
- Monarch – Louis XII

== Events ==
- 6 June - The French suffer defeat at the Battle of Novara during the War of the League of Cambrai.
- 16 August -Henry VIII of England defeated the French at the Battle of the Spurs.
- Unknown - Louis XII commissions the Tour Royale in Toulon

== Births ==
- October 30 - Jacques Amyot, French bishop and writer (d.1593)
