= 1502 in France =

- Decades: 1480s; 1490s; 1500s; 1510s; 1520s
- See also: History of France; Timeline of French history; List of years in France

Events from the year 1502 in France.

== Incumbents ==
- Monarch – Louis XII

== Events ==
- December – The French army defeats the Spanish in the Second Battle of Seminara as part of the Italian Wars of 1499–1504. The engagement is also referred to as the Battle of Terranova in some sources.

== Births ==
- March 18 – Philibert de Chalon, Prince of Orange (d. 1530).
- June 2 – Guillaume Bigot, French writer (d. 1550).

=== Date unknown ===
- Blaise de Monluc, French soldier (d. 1577).

== Deaths ==
- December 23 – Jean-Simon de Champigny, Bishop of Paris.

=== Date unknown ===
- Octavien de Saint-Gelais, French poet and translator (b. 1468).
