= 1504 in France =

- Decades: 1480s; 1490s; 1500s; 1510s; 1520s
- See also: History of France; Timeline of French history; List of years in France

Events from the year 1504 in France.

== Incumbents ==
- Monarch – Louis XII

== Events ==
- January 1 – The last French garrison in Naples, Gaeta, surrenders to the Spanish army, ending the French presence in Naples.
- January 31 – With the Treaty of Lyon, King Louis XII cedes Naples to King Ferdinand II of Aragon.
- September 22 – The Treaty of Blois between King Louis XII, Holy Roman Emperor Maximilian I, and Archduke Philip is signed. The treaty is meant to unite the Habsburg and Valois monarchs.

== Births ==
- September 21 – Jean de Dinteville, French diplomat (d. 1555).

== Deaths ==
- May 5 – Antoine de Bourgogne, bastard son of Philip III, Duke of Burgundy (b. 1421).
