= 1500 in France =

- Decades: 1480s; 1490s; 1500s; 1510s; 1520s
- See also: History of France; Timeline of French history; List of years in France

Events from the year 1500 in France.

== Incumbents ==
- Monarch – Louis XII

== Events ==
- January 5 – Duke Ludovico Sforza recaptures Milan from the French, but is soon driven out by the French.
- January 12 – The Siege of Forlì ends. Franco-Papal victory by Cesare Borgia over Caterina Sforza.
- February 5 – Ludovico Sforza and his Swiss mercenary army retake the city of Milan from the French.
- March 21 – Ludovico Sforza and his Swiss mercenary army retake Novara from the French.
- March 24 – Louis II de la Trémoille joins the main French army at Mortara, Lombardy with a corps of about 500 men, supported by artillery.
- April 8–10 – Battle of Novara takes place during the Second Italian War. French victory over Ludovico Sforza.
- June 29 – A combined force of troops from the Kingdom of France and from the Republic of Florence lays siege to the city of Pisa.
- November 11 – The Treaty of Granada is signed by Louis XII and Ferdinand II of Aragon in secret, in which they agree to partition the Kingdom of Naples between them.

== Births ==
- January 9 – Diane de Poitiers, noblewoman and courtier (d. 1566).
- January 20 – Jean Quintin, French priest, knight and writer (d. 1561).
- August 16 – Louis Gonzaga (Rodomonte), Italian-French dignitary and diplomat (d. 1532).

=== Date unknown ===
- Charles Dumoulin, French jurist (d. 1566).
- Jeanne de la Font, French poet and culture patron (d. 1532).

== Deaths ==
=== Date unknown ===
- André d'Espinay, French Roman Catholic bishop and cardinal (b. ca. 1451).
- Jean d'Armagnac, Duke of Nemours (b. 1467).
- John of Foix, Viscount of Narbonne (b. 1450).
