= Saint Yon =

Saint Yon, a family of Parisian butchers in the 14th and 15th centuries. Guillaume de Saint Yon is cited as the richest butcher of the Grande Boucherie in the 14th century. The family played an important role during the quarrels of the Armagnacs and Burgundians. They were among the leaders of the Cabochien Revolt of 1413. Driven out by the Armagnacs, they recovered their influence after the return of the Burgundians to Paris in 1418, but had to flee again in 1436 when the constable, Arthur, Earl of Richmond, took the city. Gamier de Saint Yon was échevin of Paris in 1413 and 1419; Jean de Saint Yon, his brother, was valet de chambre of the dauphin Louis, son of King Charles VI of France. Both were in the service of the king of England during the English domination. Richard de Saint Yon was master of the butchers of the Grande Boucherie in 1460.
