= Étienne de Vesc =

Étienne de Vesc (ca 1445 – 6 October 1501), was a courtier of Louis XI of France and a formative influence on Charles VIII, whom he strongly encouraged in the French adventure into Italy in the First Italian War (1494–95).

== Biography ==
Étienne de Vesc's forebears originated in Provence, appearing since the eleventh century, as modest seigneurs of Comps, Dieulefit, Béconne, Montjoux and Espeluche, with some experience in the Crusades; the chronicler Philippe de Commines, an enemy of Vesc, belittled his background. He spent his youth in the Dauphiné, not part of France until 1486, finishing a courtly training in the household of the Dauphin at Plessis-les-Tours, where he served as valet de chambre from the age of seventeen, about 1462. In 1470, Louis XI, looking for persons who would prove affidés et sûrs made Vesc the governor of the household at Amboise of Charles, the future Charles VIII, who remained attached to Vesc and to the château d'Amboise the rest of his life. The education he provided his young charge was largely derived from fanciful romans courtois the romances of chivalry; his services to the King included some embassies, as far away as Spain. In 1475 he took a wife, from a rich family of bourgeois background, whose late father had been an avocat au parlement de Paris and whose mother had remarried into a family of goldsmiths.

His devoted attendance during a long illness of the young prince and other services were well rewarded by Louis, and he took part in the dauphin's wedding, July 1483. After his attendance at the king's deathbed later that year, Vesc was a member of the council of regency. Among his duties was an embassy to Avignon to diplomatically check the ambitions of the Cardinal Legate Giulio Della Rovere, nephew of the late Pope Sixtus IV.

In the entourage of Charles, Vesc had doubtless made the acquaintance of Jean II de Châlons, prince of Orange, seigneur de Caromb, which Vesc purchased in 1484 for the very considerable sum of 10,000 livres and made into an important center of the Comtat Venaissin, which remained a papal enclave within France until 1792. Pope Innocent VIII confirmed his rights as seigneur in what was papal territory in 1489, and Vesc constructed a grand château, completed in 1486. In addition to the outright purchase, Jean de Châlons granted him fiefs as well, securing part of Vesc's allegiance as his vassal. Vesc scarcely had time to reside in his château; he was appointed sénéchal of Carcassonne, then of Beaucaire and Nîmes, largest in extent in France, positions of great importance.

== In the Italian campaign ==
The extinction of the House of Anjou in the person of René, count of an independent Provence and King of Naples (1480), rendered Charles VIII the heir to Angevin titles to the Kingdom of Naples. According to Commines' chronicle, Étienne de Vesc was among the most ardent proponents of a chivalrous adventure to recapture the rights of the King of France to Naples, and to gain some duchies in the south, pressed by his own ambition, thirsty for grandeur and titles. Commines reflected on Vesc's naivety in matters of war. The preliminary arrangements for the entry into Italy were in Vesc's hands.

Turin and Asti welcomed the French; Milan was theirs; Piero de' Medici opened the gates of Florence, 17 November: a few days later Charles declared that he was the very champion of Religion against the Turks. Pope Alexander VI had cooled to the too-triumphant French; Vesc arranged for safe passage for French forces across the Papal States, and even for some strongholds left in French hands to assure their safe return passage: the treaty was signed on 15 January. Welcomed as they proceeded, the French troops were in Naples by 19 February, and Charles was able to make his triumphant entry three days later, Alphonso having fled, abdicating his crown to his son. Invested with territories, including the duchy of Nola and made chamberlain, put in charge of the kingdom's finances, Vesc was also in charge of the fortress of Gaeta, commanding a major port. After arranging some festive jousts, the king decided to return to France in April 1495, his Neapolitan kingdom securely won, leaving a small occupation force under Louis II, Count of Montpensier as viceroy, but taking the major force to face the league that was assembling against him in the north. On 20 May, however, the Neapolitan populace was up in arms, the experience of a rapacious, ill-paid occupying army loosely organized under captains having proved more onerous than expected. A revolt at Gaeta also had to be repressed. When Ferdinand of Aragon disembarked at Naples, with nine galleys and some thirty Spanish caravels, he was welcomed by the Neapolitans: Vesc on 6 July had scarcely time to shut himself up in the Castello Nuovo: Charles, at the battle of Fornovo the same day, was forced to abandon his rich baggage train laden with booty from Naples and return to France. Expected reinforcements never arrived in Naples. Vesc, with the viceroy M. de Montpensier and the rest of the French who remained, embarked in a small flotilla laden with booty and artillery for Salerno on 25 October, leaving Naples to the Neapolitans and Ferdinand.

In March 1496 he was sent back to France to organize rescue efforts, loading the contents of a warehouse of butin sacré et profane. In May he was once again with the young king, who was already planning a return engagement. Vesc was reimbursed for his expenses defending Gaeta and placed in charge of sending required materials to the garrisons, who were being forced out of one fortress after another in the Kingdom of Naples. Gaeta, the last French toehold in the Regno, capitulated, 19 November 1497, and the last of the expedition was over, an expense of two and a half million francs.

Vesc continued to be enthusiastic about a return to Italy, but the royal council was against it. In February 1498 a treaty reassigned Naples to the Aragonese.

In April Charles VIII died. Étienne de Vesc was retained in his posts of concierge du Palais and Sénéchal of Beaucaire by Louis XII. In September Vesc was charged with negotiations with the Republic of Venice, and he contributed a fully fitted-out galleass for Louis XII's brief expedition to Naples.

His magnificent late Gothic tomb is to be found in the church of Caromb, Drôme.

== See also ==
- Italian Wars
