= Treaty of Frankfurt (1489) =

1489 treaty between Austria and France

The Treaty of Frankfurt was signed on 22 July 1489 at Frankfurt between Maximilian of Austria and the envoys of King Charles VIII of France. Based on the terms of the peace agreement, King Charles agreed to promote reconciliation between Maximilian and the Flemish rebels. Moreover, he surrendered the French-occupied towns in Brittany to Duchess Anne of Brittany on the condition that Duchess Anne remove all English forces from the duchy.

== See also ==
- List of treaties

== Sources ==
- Currin, John M. Persuasions to Peace: The Luxembourg-Marigny-Gaguin Embassy and the State of Anglo-French Relations, 1489–90. The English Historical Review. Oxford University Press, 1998.
