= Pierre-Jules Jollivet =

French painter and lithographer (1803–1871)

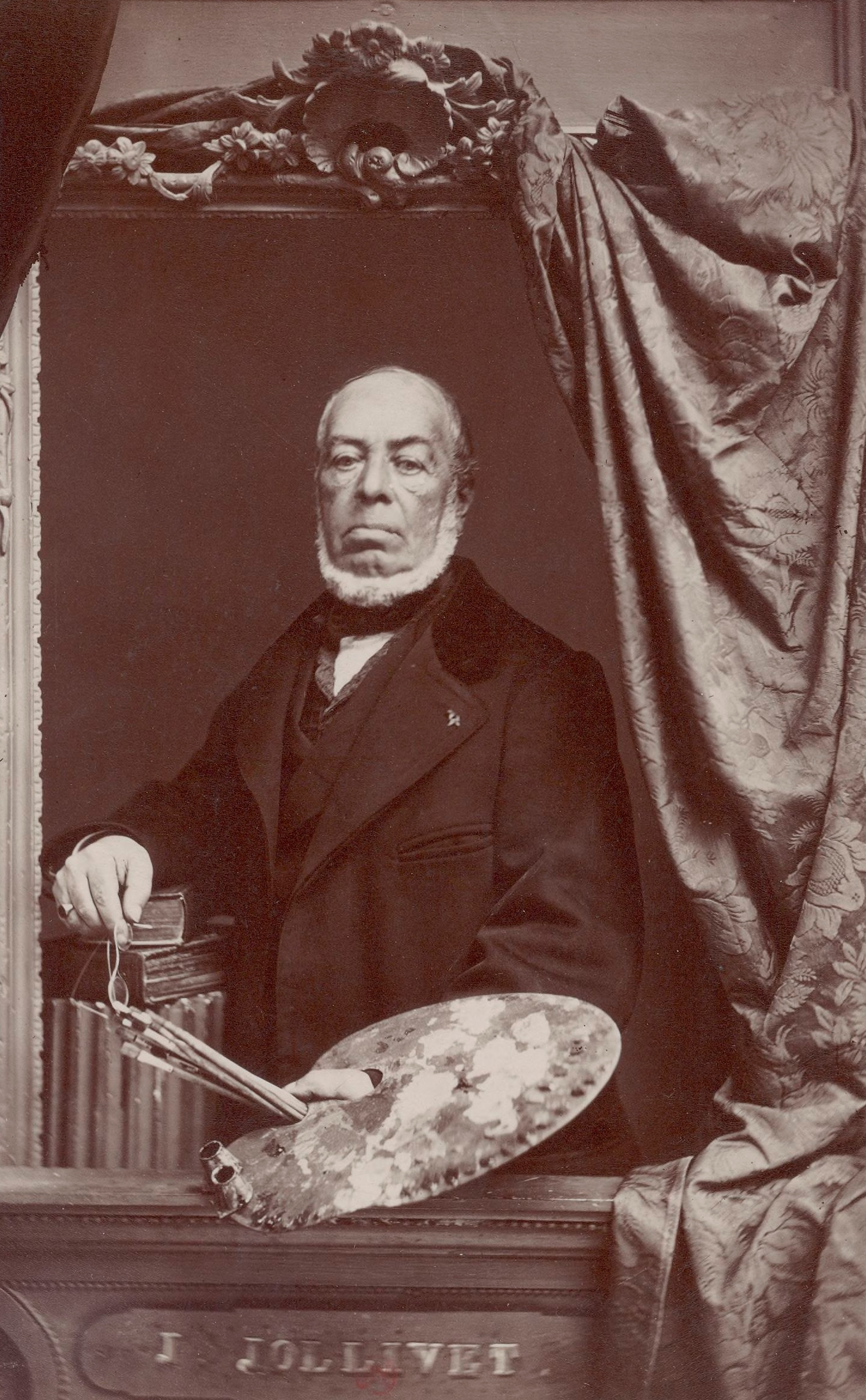
Pierre-Jules Jollivet; photograph by Adolphe Dallemagne

Pierre-Jules Jollivet (27 June 1803, in Paris – 7 September 1871, in Paris) was a French painter and lithographer who worked mostly in the Romantic style and is largely known for genre scenes.

== Biography ==
He initially studied architecture with Jacques-Marie Huvé and Auguste Famin. It was only in 1822 that he decided to focus on painting instead. That year, he entered the École des Beaux-arts de Paris and remained there until 1825. His primary instructors were François-Louis Dejuinne and Antoine-Jean Gros; both painters of historical and genre scenes.

At the same time, he became interested in lithography, a new printing method devised in the 1790s by the actor, Alois Senefelder. In 1826, this interest took him to Spain to work on a catalog of the paintings belonging to King Ferdinand VII at the Royal Palace of Madrid. He eventually contributed eighteen plates for that publication. he remained there for a short time after completing his work before returning to Paris.

He established himself as a painter of genre and historical scenes and drew on his experiences in Spain for inspiration. After acquiring a small amount of notoriety, he began to exhibit his works; beginning in 1831. His initial presentation consisted entirely of Spanish-themed works; some in homage to Diego Velázquez. In 1833, he was awarded a prize at the Salon for his "Brigands of the Kingdom of Valencia".

For many years, works on Spanish subjects would predominate in his oeuvre. His depiction of a guerrillera (1834) is now in the Louvre. In the latter part of the 1830s, King Louis-Philippe I placed him in charge of creating a series of large historical panels for the Musée de l’Histoire de France. Two of the best known depict the Battle of Hooglede (1794) and Godefroy de Bouillon presenting the first assizes for the Kingdom of Jerusalem. He also did an etching, showing the Battle of Tourcoing.

He some religious works as well, such as a "Massacre of the Innocents", and participated in the decoration of several Parisian churches; including Saint-Ambroise, Saint-Antoine-des-Quinze-Vingts and Saint-Vincent-de-Paul. For the latter, he used an innovative ceramic painting technique; applied to large slabs of lava from Volvic. In 1844, he returned to Saint-Vincent-de-Paul to create a tableau representing the Trinity. Other paintings were added later. One, depicting Adam and Eve in Paradise, contained nudity and created a scandal. It was removed in 1861, placed out of sight, and not restored to its original position until 2011.

== Selected paintings ==
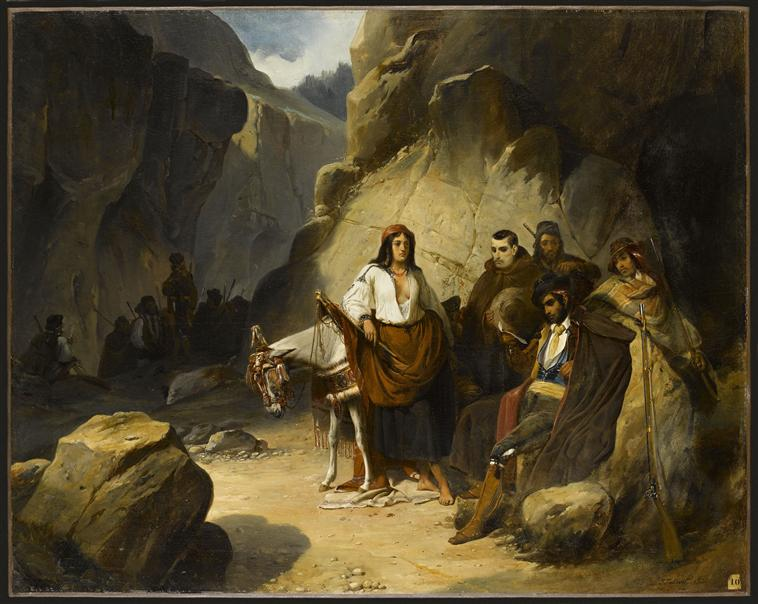
La Guerrillera

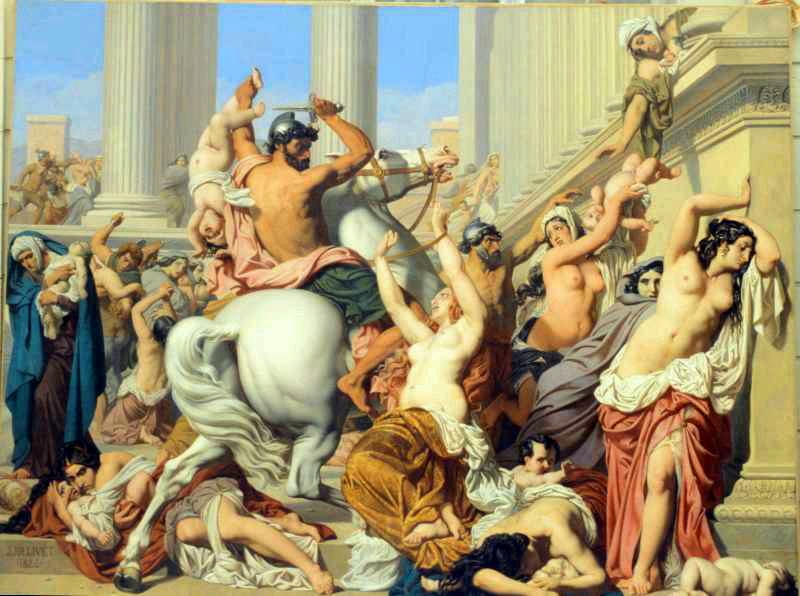
Massacre of the Innocents

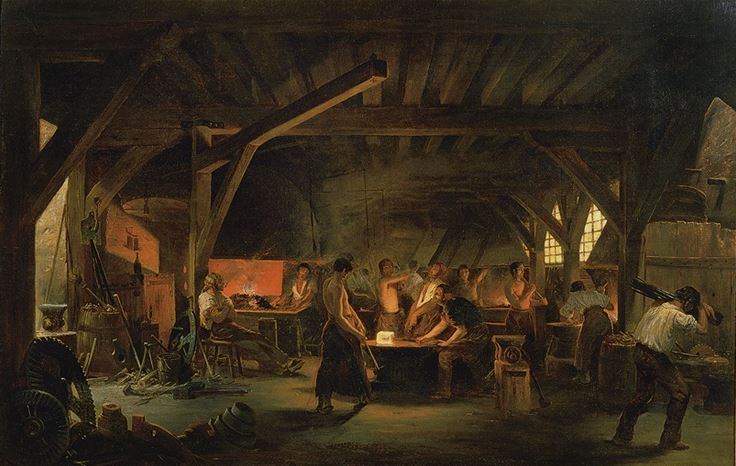
Ironworks

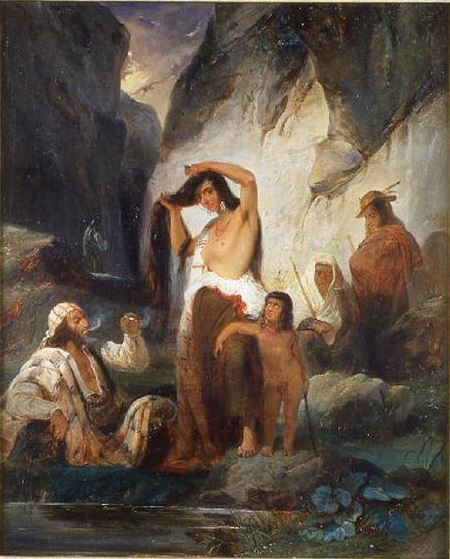
Resting Gypsies

== Sources ==
- Biography @ Grove Art Online
