= Charles de Sainte-Marthe =

French Protestant and theologian

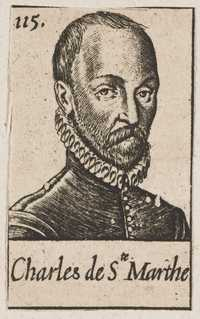

Charles de Sainte-Marthe (1512–1555) was a French Protestant and theologian.
