= Charles Orlando, Dauphin of France =

French noble

Charles Orlando
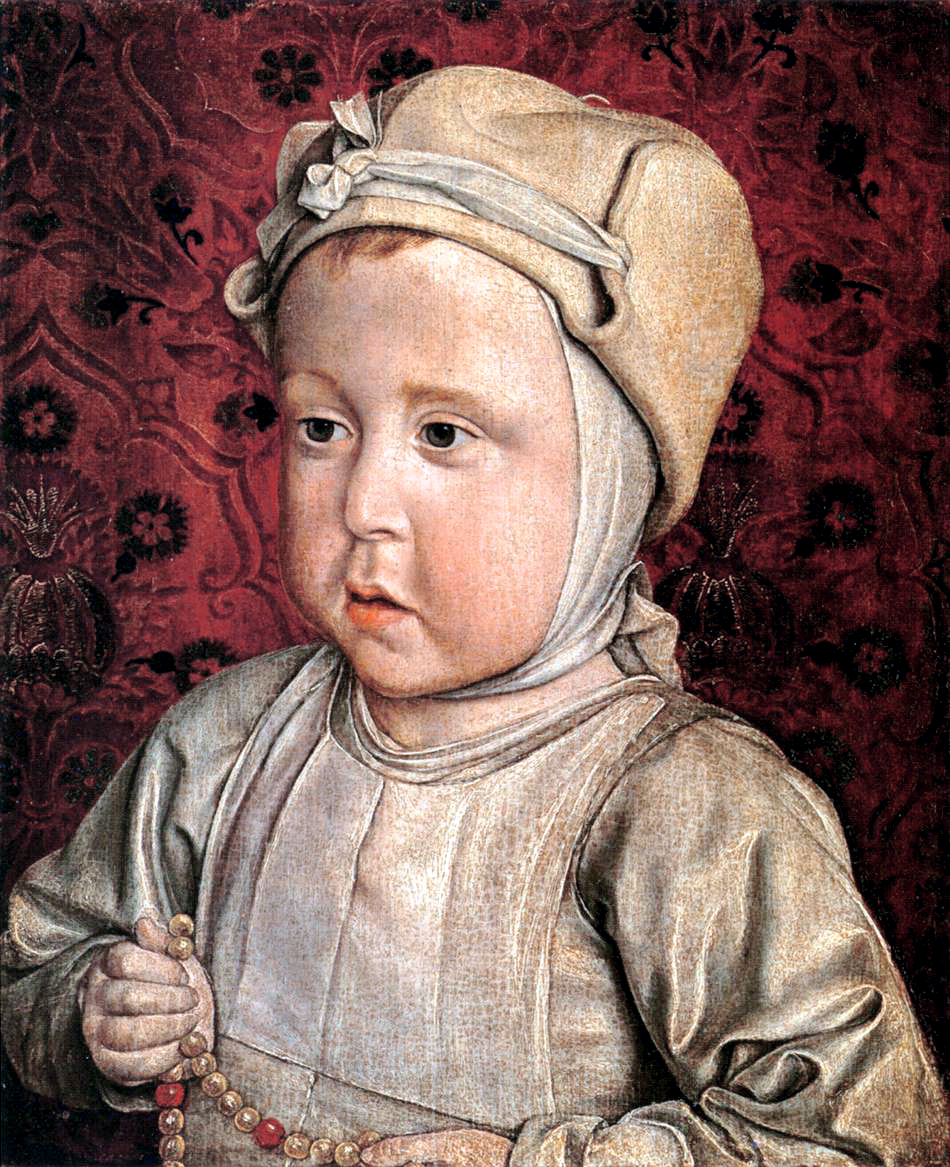
- Portrait by Jean Hey, c. 1494

Dauphin of France
- Tenure: 11 October 1492 – 16 December 1495
- Predecessor: Charles
- Successor: Charles
- Born: 11 October 1492; Château de Plessis-lez-Tours
- Died: 16 December 1495 (aged 3); Château d'Amboise
- Burial: Cathedral of Saint-Martin, Tours
- House: Valois
- Father: Charles VIII of France
- Mother: Anne of Brittany

Charles Orlando, Dauphin of France (French: Charles Orland, Dauphin de France) (11 October 1492 – 16 December 1495) was the eldest son and heir of King Charles VIII of France and Duchess Anne of Brittany.

== Build-up ==
Charles Orlando's parents, Charles VIII and Anne, had married in December 1491, less than a year before his birth. The marriage had begun unhappily, with the new queen resenting the marriage forced upon her and the political dominance of her sister-in-law, Anne, Duchess of Bourbon. Her pregnancy was thus greeted with special joy by her, as well as by the King and the people, for the depleted elder branch of the House of Valois depended on a male heir. Accordingly, Anne spent her pregnancy at ease, given the devoted attention of her husband who ensured that she would not be tired out or subject to unnecessary travel. In the autumn of 1492, the King and Queen went to the château of Plessis-lès-Tours where all was prepared for the birth of the hoped-for boy.

== Birth and life ==
The Queen went into labour on the night of 10 October and was swiftly attended to by the royal doctors and midwives. With her was Charles who, much to the annoyance of those around, soon lost his calm due to anxiety. However, all went well, and at 4 o'clock in the morning, the Queen gave birth to a robust and well-formed boy who was automatically Dauphin of France.

The Dauphin was immediately the subject of controversy. His parents and his godmother, Jeanne de Laval, widow of King René I of Naples, wanted to name him Orlando (French: Orland), after Roland, the Carolingian hero of The Song of Roland whose name was rendered thus in Italian. The name had been suggested to them by François of Paule, a hermit and preacher in whom they had confidence. However, the godfathers (Louis, Duke of Orléans, next in line for the throne, and Peter II, Duke of Bourbon) flatly refused to allow a future king of France to be given such a foreign name and begged for him to be named instead after his ancestors: Louis, Philippe, or Charles.

Finally, after three days of dispute, a compromise was reached: the Dauphin would be named Charles Orland in the French language, and Carolus Orlandus in Latin. This settled, the baptism was held on 13 October. The Dauphin, clad in cloth of gold, was carried into the Church of Saint Jean of Plessisour by John IV of Chalon-Arlay, Prince of Orange and was baptised in the font there, surrounded by the greatest lords of the Court, each holding the candle, the basin or the towel. During the ceremony, Charles VIII held the hand of François of Paule, who led the ceremony and blessed Charles Orlando. Anne of Brittany, still recovering, was not in attendance.

Described by the chronicler Philippe de Commines as a "beautiful child and daring in word, not fearing the things that the other children are accustomed to fear", Charles Orlando was a healthy and vigorous child, who grew well and strong, a fluent speaker by age 3. He had a fair complexion, black eyes and was chubby. When he reached the age of 18 months, he was installed in Amboise, monitored by two governors, the lords de Boisy and That-Guénant, a governess, Madame de Bussière, and surrounded by a multitude of servants. He was the pride and joy of his parents. His mother doted on him, buying him presents; his father described him as the "most beautiful of gems". Both insisted on being kept informed of his health and his progress, by means of letters and messages.

The King also took a series of measures in order to protect his heir. Hunting in the forest of Amboise was prohibited; the gates of the city were reduced to four, making it easier to monitor traffic and to seal the city where necessary; archers were posted at the strategic points of the castle; and the child was constantly in the prayers of François of Paule.

== Death ==
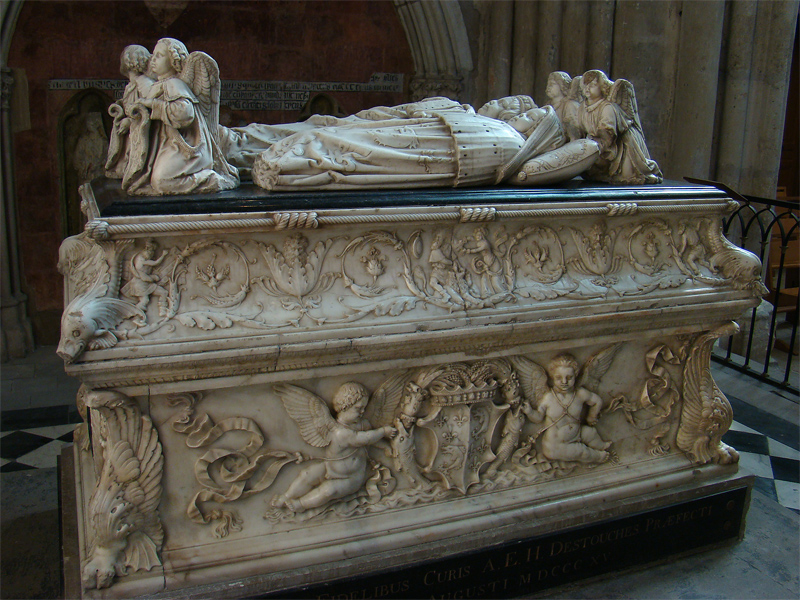
Tomb of Charles Orland and Charles, two sons of Anne and Charles VIII at Tours Cathedral.

In the autumn of 1495, when an epidemic of measles struck Touraine, (Note: Broomhall states it was an outbreak of smallpox.) Charles VIII (who after returning from Italy remained in Lyon, where he was joined by the Queen), ordered the child to be even more closely cloistered in Amboise. But to no avail: Charles Orlando contracted measles, and in spite of the efforts of the doctors and the prayers of the monks, he died on 16 December 1495.

Charles VIII, deeply affected, but advised by his physicians to remain staunch and cheerful, succeeded in hiding his sorrow; Anne gave herself up to her grief so violently that for a time her life, and her sanity, were feared for. The year following his death, a younger brother was born and he, too, was named Charles, but he only lived for less than a month (8 September 1496 – 2 October 1496). Both children were buried at Saint Gatien's Cathedral, Tours, with gisants erected for them by the French sculptor Michel Colombe in 1506.

== Sources ==
- Broomhall, Susan (2004). Women's Medical Work in Early Modern France. Manchester University Press.
- (in French) Le Dauphin Charles-Orland

Charles Orlando, Dauphin of France House of Valois Cadet branch of the Capetian dynasty Born: 11 October 1492 Died: 16 December 1495
French royalty
Vacant Title last held by Charles, 11th Dauphin	Dauphin of France; 11 October 1492 – 16 December 1495	Vacant Title next held by Charles, 13th Dauphin
French nobility
Preceded by Charles VI	Dauphin of Viennois; Count of Valentinois and Diois; 11 October 1492 – 16 December 1495	Succeeded by Charles VI
