= Charles VIII of France =

King of France from 1483 to 1498

Charles VIII
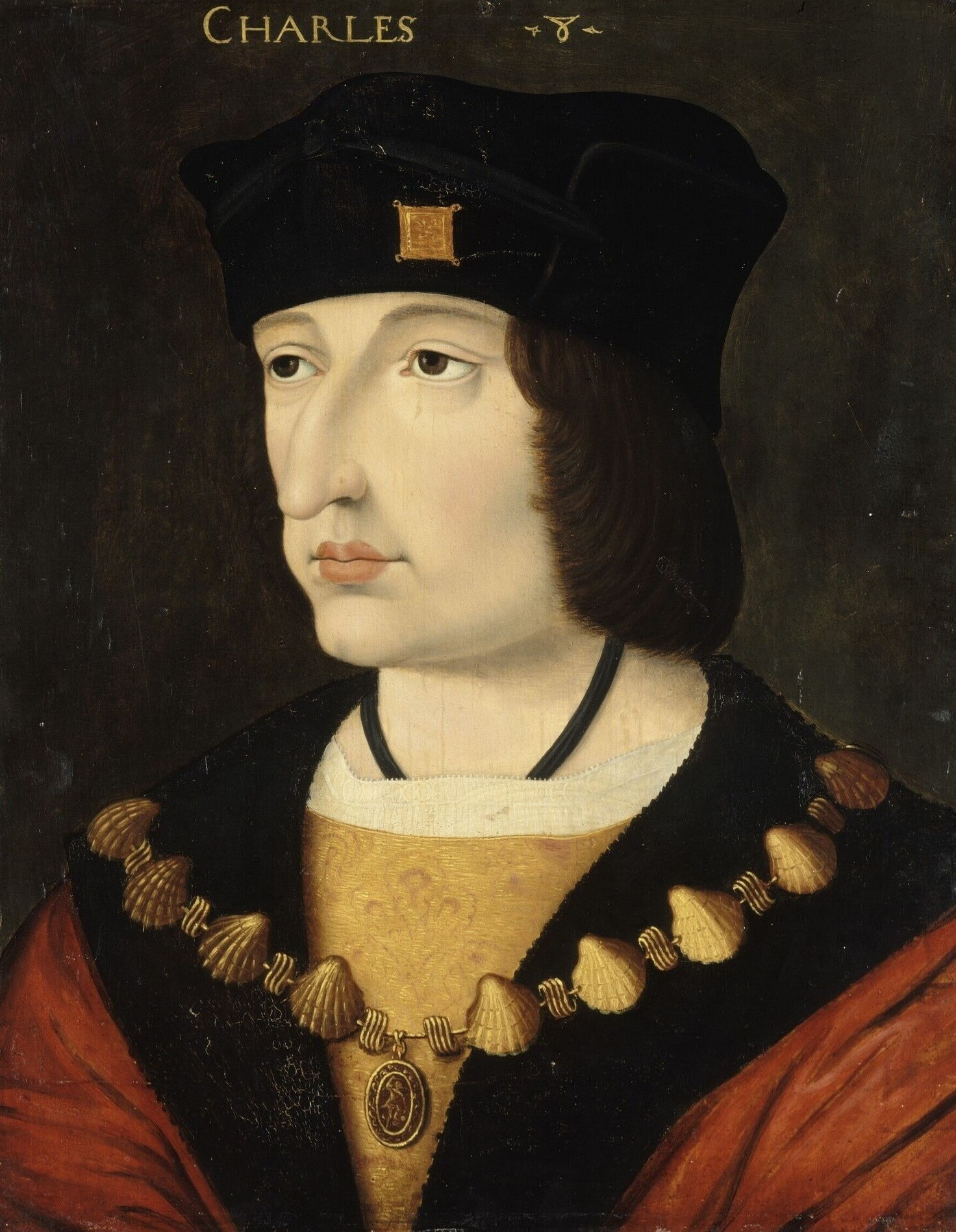
- 16th-century portrait

King of France
- Reign: 30 August 1483 – 7 April 1498
- Coronation: 30 May 1484 (Reims)
- Predecessor: Louis XI
- Successor: Louis XII
- Regents: Anne of France and Peter II, Duke of Bourbon (1483–1491)
- Born: 30 June 1470; Château d'Amboise, France
- Died: 7 April 1498 (aged 27); Château d'Amboise, France
- Burial: 1 May 1498; Saint Denis Basilica (body); Notre-Dame de Cléry Basilica, Cléry-Saint-André (heart)
- Spouse: Anne, Duchess of Brittany (m. 1491)
- Issue more...: Charles Orlando, Dauphin of France; Francis of France; Charles, Dauphin of France; Francis, Dauphin of France; Anne of France
- House: Valois
- Father: Louis XI of France
- Mother: Charlotte of Savoy

Charles VIII (30 June 1470 – 7 April 1498), called the Affable (French: l'Affable), was King of France from 1483 to his death in 1498. He succeeded his father Louis XI at the age of 13. His elder sister Anne acted as regent jointly with her husband Peter II, Duke of Bourbon until 1491, when the young king turned 21 years of age. During Anne's regency, the great lords rebelled against royal centralisation efforts in a conflict known as the Mad War (1485–1488), which resulted in a victory for the royal government.

In a remarkable stroke of audacity, Charles married Anne of Brittany in 1491 after she had already been married by proxy to the Habsburg heir Maximilian I in a ceremony of questionable validity. Preoccupied by the problematic succession in the Kingdom of Hungary, Maximilian failed to press his claim. Upon his marriage, Charles became administrator of Brittany and established a personal union that enabled France to avoid total encirclement by Habsburg territories.

To secure his rights to the Neapolitan throne that René of Anjou had left to his father, Charles made a series of concessions to neighbouring monarchs and, due to his revolutionary artillery, conquered the Italian Peninsula without much opposition. A coalition formed against the French invasion of 1494–1498 attempted to stop Charles' army at Fornovo, but failed and Charles marched his army back to France.

Charles died in 1498 after supposedly striking his head accidentally on the lintel of a door at the Château d'Amboise, his place of birth, but that has been subject to re-analysis. Since he had no male heir, he was succeeded by his second cousin once removed and brother-in-law at the time, Louis XII, from the Orléans cadet branch of the House of Valois.

== Youth ==
Charles was born at the Château d'Amboise in France, the only surviving son of King Louis XI by his second wife Charlotte of Savoy. His godparents were Charles II, Duke of Bourbon (the godchild's namesake), Joan of Valois, Duchess of Bourbon, and the teenage Edward of Westminster, the son of Henry VI of England, who had been living in France following his father's deposition by Edward IV. Charles succeeded to the throne on 30 August 1483 at the age of 13. His health was poor. He was regarded by his contemporaries as possessing a pleasant disposition, but also as foolish and unsuited for the business of the state. In accordance with the wishes of Louis XI, the regency of the kingdom was granted to Charles' elder sister Anne, a formidably intelligent and shrewd woman described by her father as "the least foolish woman in France". She ruled as regent, together with her husband Peter of Bourbon, until 1491.

== Marriage ==
Charles was betrothed on 22 July 1483 to the 3-year-old Margaret of Austria, daughter of the Archduke Maximilian of Austria (later Holy Roman Emperor Maximilian I) and Mary, Duchess of Burgundy. The marriage was arranged by Louis XI, Maximilian, and the Estates of the Low Countries as part of the 1482 Peace of Arras between France and the Duchy of Burgundy. Margaret brought the counties of Artois and Franche-Comté to France as her dowry, and she was raised in the French court as a prospective queen.

In 1488, Francis II, Duke of Brittany, died in a riding accident, leaving his 11-year-old daughter Anne as his heir. Anne, who feared for the independence of her duchy against the ambitions of France, arranged a marriage in 1490 between herself and the widower Maximilian. The regent Anne of France and her husband Peter refused to countenance such a marriage, however, since it would place Maximilian and his family, the Habsburgs, on two French borders. The French army invaded Brittany, taking advantage of the preoccupation of Maximilian and his father, Emperor Frederick III, with the disputed succession to Mathias Corvinus, King of Hungary. Anne of Brittany was forced to renounce Maximilian (whom she had only married by proxy) and agree to be married to Charles VIII instead.

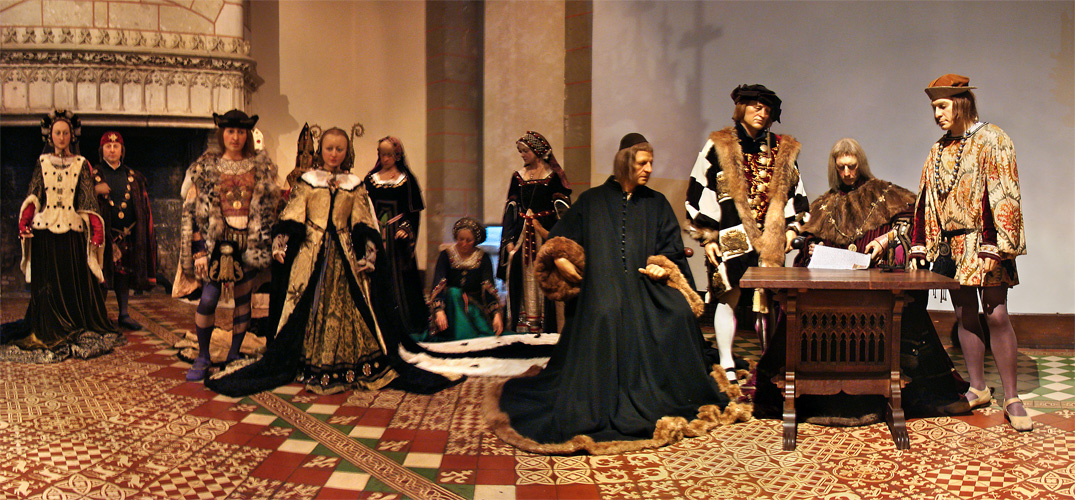
Marriage to Anne of Brittany at the Château de Langeais.

In December 1491, in an elaborate ceremony at the Château de Langeais, Charles and Anne of Brittany were married. The 14-year-old Duchess Anne, not happy with the arranged marriage, arrived for her wedding with her entourage carrying two beds. However, Charles's marriage brought him independence from his relatives and thereafter he managed affairs according to his own inclinations. Queen Anne lived at the Clos Lucé in Amboise.

There still remained the matter of Charles' first betrothed, the young Margaret of Austria. Although the cancellation of her betrothal meant that she by rights should have been returned to her family, Charles did not initially do so, intending to marry her usefully elsewhere in France. Eventually, in 1493, she was returned to her family, together with her dowry – though the Duchy of Burgundy was retained in the Treaty of Senlis.

Around the king there was a circle of court poets, the most memorable being the Italian humanist Publio Fausto Andrelini from Forlì, who spread Renaissance humanism in France. During a pilgrimage to pay respects to his father's remains, Charles observed Mont Aiguille and ordered Antoine de Ville to ascend to the summit in an early technical alpine climb, later alluded to by Rabelais.

== Italian War ==
To secure France against invasions, Charles made treaties with Maximilian I of Austria (the Treaty of Senlis on 23 May 1493), Ferdinand II of Aragon (the Treaty of Barcelona on 19 January, 1493), and England (the Treaty of Étaples on 3 November 1492), buying their neutrality with large concessions. The English monarch Henry VII had forced Charles to abandon his support for the pretender Perkin Warbeck by dispatching an expedition which laid siege to Boulogne. He devoted France's resources to building up a large army, including one of Europe's first siege trains with artillery.

In 1489, Charles was offered Naples by Pope Innocent VIII (1484–1492), who was at odds with Ferdinand I of Naples. He then returned Perpignan to Ferdinand II of Aragon to free up forces for the invasion of Italy. The next year in 1494, Milan faced an additional threat. On 25 January 1494, Ferdinand I of Naples, died unexpectedly, making Alfonso II, king of Naples. In addition to this, with papal support, Alfonso II laid claim to the Milanese duchy. Ludovico Sforza, duke of Milan, sought an alliance with Charles, who was also urged on in this adventure by his favorite courtier, Étienne de Vesc.

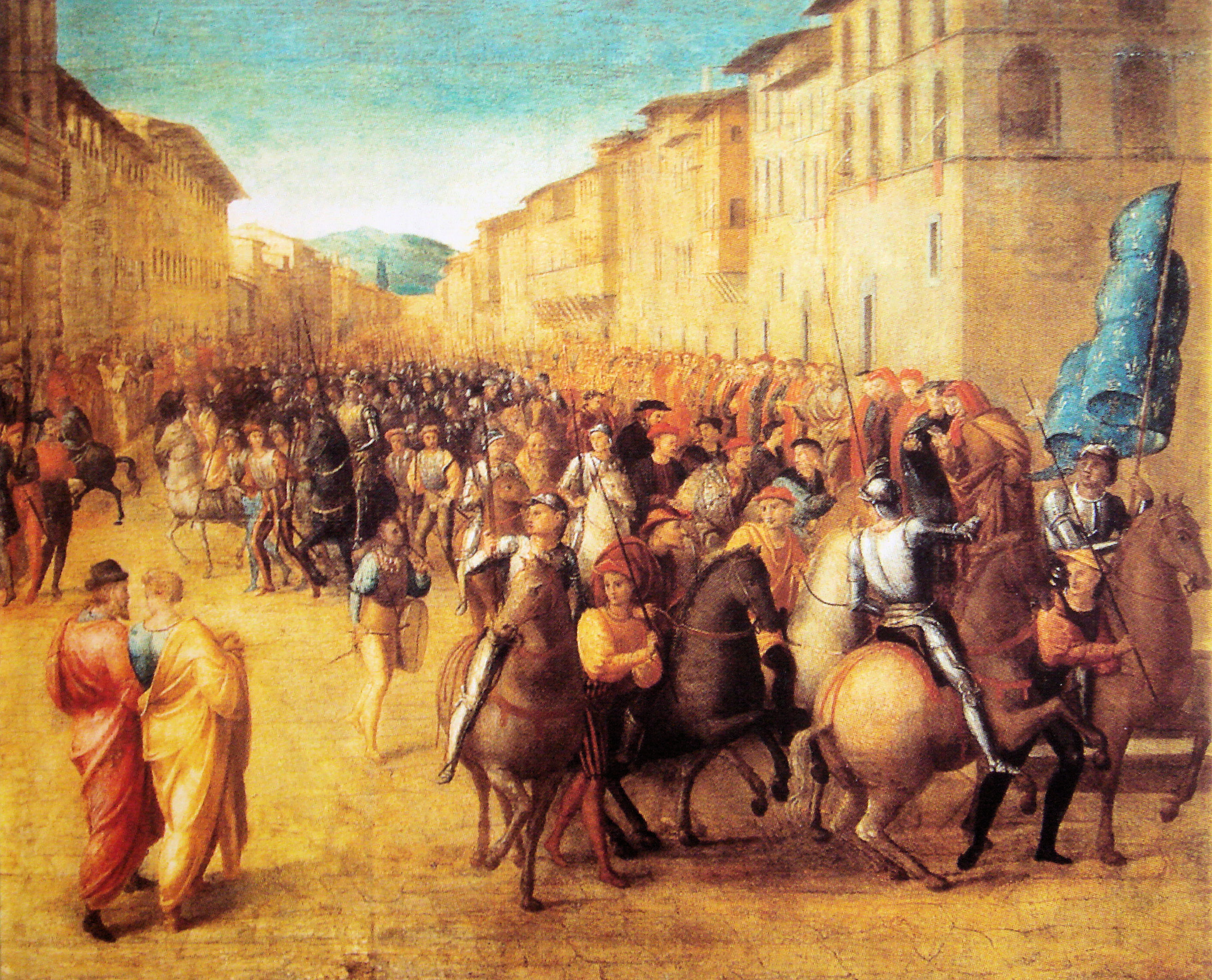
French troops under Charles VIII entering Florence, 17 November 1494, by Francesco Granacci

In an event that was to prove a watershed in Italian history, Charles invaded Italy with 25,000 men (including 8,000 Swiss mercenaries) in September 1494. He arrived in Pavia on 21 October 1494 and entered Pisa on 8 November 1494. The French army subdued Florence in passing on their way south. Reaching Naples on 22 February 1495, the French Army took Naples without a pitched battle or siege; Alfonso was expelled, and Charles was crowned King of Naples on 20 May 1495.

There were those in the Republic of Florence who appreciated the presence of the French king and his Army. The famous friar Savonarola believed that King Charles VIII was God's tool to purify the corruption of Florence. He believed that once Charles had ousted the evil sinners of Florence, the city would become a center of morality. Thus, Florence was the appropriate place to restructure the Church. This situation would eventually spill over into another conflict between Pope Alexander VI, who despised the idea of having the king in northern Italy where the Pope feared the King of France would interfere with the Papal States, and Savonarola, who called for the king's intervention. This conflict would eventually lead Savonarola to be suspected of heresy and to be executed by the State.

The speed and power of the French advance frightened the other Italian rulers, including the Pope and even Ludovico of Milan. They formed an anti-French coalition, the League of Venice, on 31 March 1495. The formation of the League of Venice, which included the northern Italian states of Duchy of Milan, the Republic of Venice, the Duchy of Mantua, and the Republic of Florence in addition to the Kingdom of Spain, the Holy Roman Empire and the Kingdom of Naples, appeared to have trapped Charles in southern Italy and blocked his return to France. Charles would have to cross the territory of at least some of the League members to return home to France. At Fornovo in July 1495, the League was unable to stop Charles from marching his army out of Italy. The League lost 2,000 men to Charles' 1,000 and, although Charles lost nearly all the booty of the campaign, the League was unable to stop him from crossing their territory on his way back to France. Meanwhile, Charles' remaining garrisons in Naples were quickly subdued by Aragonese forces sent by Ferdinand II of Aragon, ally of Alfonso on 6–7 July 1495. Thus in the end, Charles VIII lost all the gains that he had made in Italy.

Over the next few years, Charles VIII tried to rebuild his army and resume the campaign, but he was hampered by the large debts incurred in 1494–95. He never succeeded in gaining anything substantive.

== Death ==
Charles died in 1498, two and a half years after his retreat from Italy, as the result of an accident. While on his way to watch a game of jeu de paume (real tennis) in Amboise he struck his head on the lintel of a door. At around 2:00 p.m., while returning from the game, he fell into a sudden coma and died nine hours later; however, 2020s analyses disputes this narrative of his death, with a 2021 study concluding that such an injury would cause only minor trauma. That same study also hypothesized Charles actually died of severe brain injuries that could have been caused by an epileptic condition, itself a result of neurosyphilis.

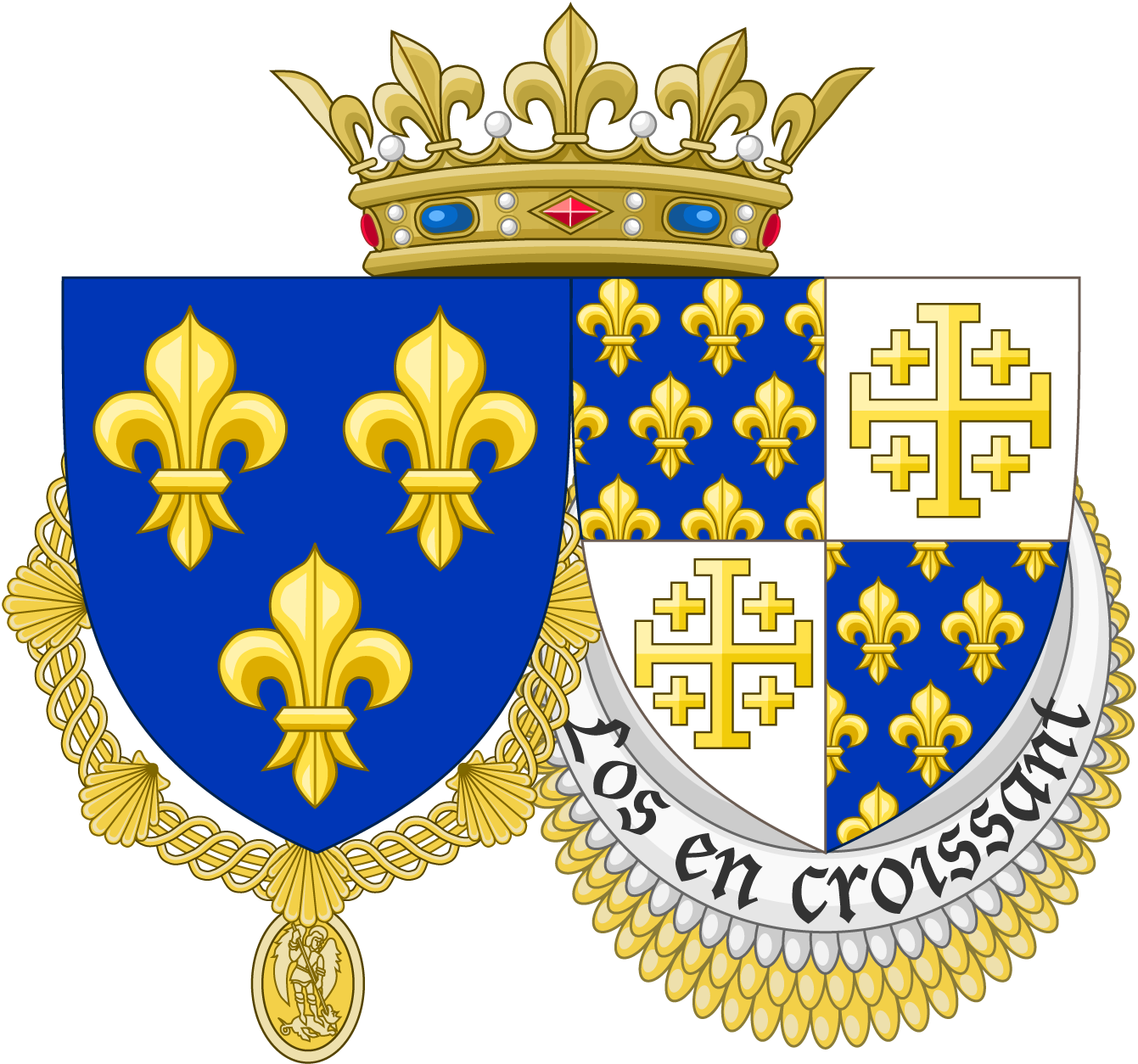
Coat of arms of Charles VIII, showing France Moderne and France Ancient quartered with Jerusalem cross, representing Charles's claim to the Kingdom of Jerusalem via the Kingdom of Naples

Charles bequeathed a meagre legacy: he left France in debt and in disarray as a result of his ambition. However, his expedition did strengthen cultural ties to Italy, energizing French art and literature in the latter part of the Renaissance. Since his children predeceased him, Charles was the last of the elder branch of the House of Valois. Upon his death, the throne passed to his brother-in-law and second cousin once removed, Louis XII. Anne returned to Brittany and began taking steps to regain the independence of her duchy. In order to stymie these efforts, Louis XII had his 24-year childless marriage to Charles's sister, Joan, annulled and married Anne.

== Issue ==
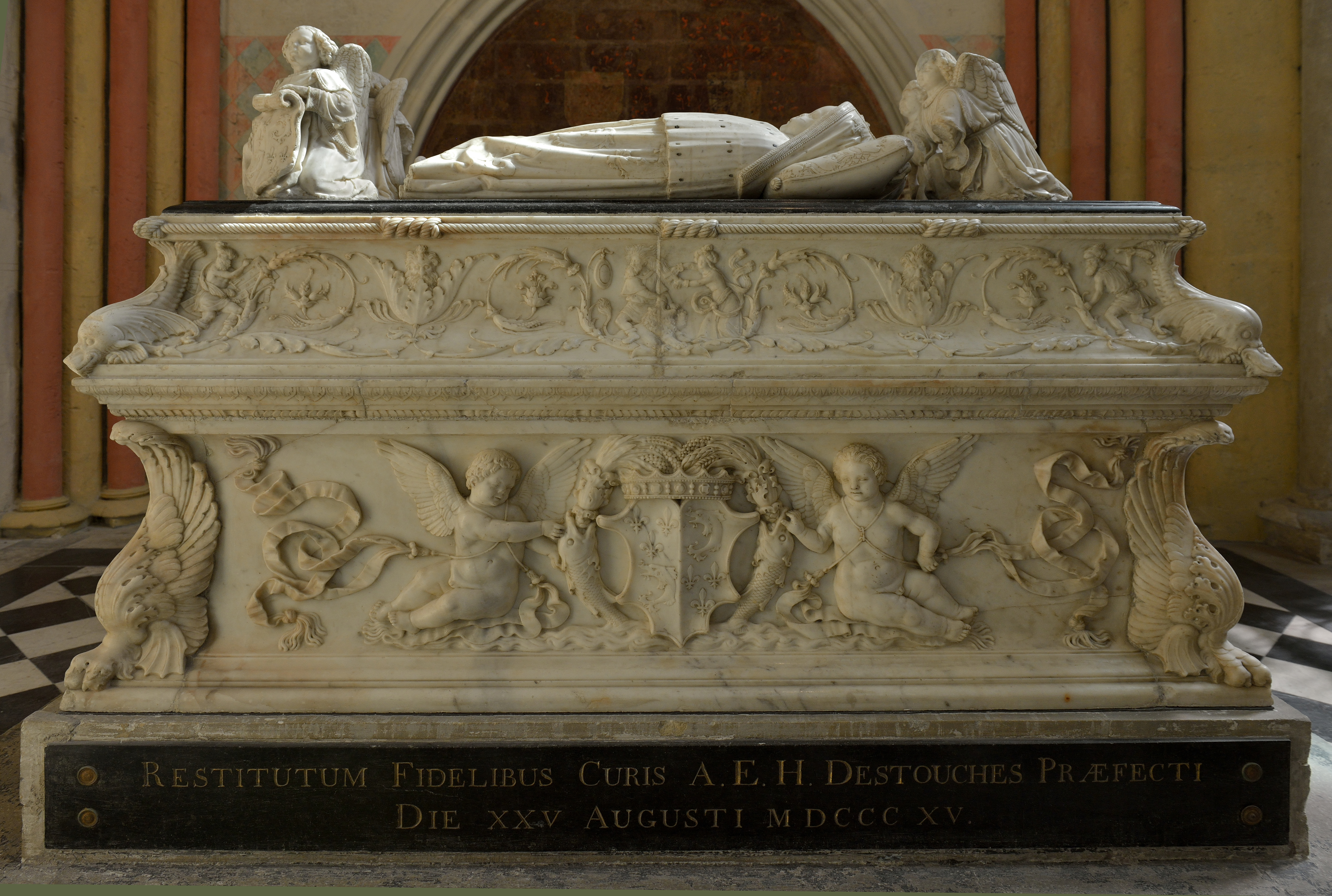
Monument to the children of Charles VIII, Tours Cathedral

Charles and Anne had:

- Charles Orlando, Dauphin of France (11 October 1492 – 16 December 1495), died of the measles when three years old. Buried at Tours Cathedral.
- Francis (August 1493), was premature and stillborn. Buried at Notre-Dame de Cléry. (Note: Anderson indicates this child born August 1493 was unnamed.)
- Stillborn daughter (March 1495)
- Charles, Dauphin of France (8 September 1496 – 2 October 1496). Buried at Tours Cathedral.
- Francis, Dauphin of France (July 1497). He died several hours after his birth. Buried at Tours Cathedral.
- Anne of France (20 March 1498). She died on the day of her birth at Château de Plessis-lez-Tours. Buried at Tours Cathedral.

== Media ==
The 1671 English play Charles VIII of France by John Crowne depicts his reign.

Charles VIII's invasion of Italy and his relations with Pope Alexander VI are depicted in the novel The Sultan's Helmsman.

In the 2011 Showtime series The Borgias, Charles VIII is portrayed by French actor Michel Muller.

In the 2011 French-German historical drama Borgia, Charles VIII is played by Simon Larvaron. The event of the king's death is depicted in the TV series Borgia with a small twist: in the episode, Charles himself plays a game of jeu de paume with Cesare Borgia and loses; while leaving the game, Charles strikes his head on the lintel of a door.

The 2012 Spanish TV series Isabel also depicts the death of Charles VIII. In that series, Charles was played by the actor Héctor Carballo.

In the 2017 German-Austrian historical drama Maximilian, a young Charles when he was Dauphin is portrayed by French actor Max Baissette de Malglaive. Made available by American cable network Starz in 2018.

== See also ==
- First Italian War
- Louis III of France, another French king who died after hitting his head on a lintel

== Sources ==
- Abulafia, David, ed. (2016). The French Descent Into Renaissance Italy, 1494–95: Antecedents and Effects. Routledge. ISBN 9781351889339.
- Anderson, Michael Alan (2014). St. Anne in Renaissance Music: Devotion and Politics. Cambridge University Press.
- Andrea, Alfred J. (2020). Medieval Record: Sources of Medieval History. Hackett Publishing Company. ISBN 9781624668708.
- Andress, David, ed. (2023). The Routledge Handbook of French History. Routledge. ISBN 978-0367406820.
- Blockmans, Wim; Prevenier, Walter (1999). Peters, Edward (ed.). The Promised Lands: The Low Countries Under Burgundian Rule, 1369-153. Translated by Fackelman, Elizabeth. University of Pennsylvania Press.
- Broomhall, Susan (2004). Women's Medical Work in Early Modern France. Manchester University Press.
- de Divitiis, Bianca (2023). A Companion to the Renaissance in Southern Italy (1350–1600). Brill. ISBN 9789004526372.
- Drees, Clayton J., ed. (2000). The Late Medieval Age of Crisis and Renewal, 1300–1500: A Biographical Dictionary. Greenwood Press.
- Fletcher, Stella (1999). The Longman Companion to Renaissance Europe, 1390–1530. Routledge.
- Gobry, Ivan (2012). Charles VIII (1483–1498). Pygmalion.
- Hand, Joni M. (2013). Women, Manuscripts and Identity in Northern Europe, 1350–1550. Ashgate Publishing.
- Kendall, Paul Murray (1971). Louis XI: The Universal Spider. W. W. Norton & Company.
- Mallet, Michael; Shaw, Christine (2012). The Italian Wars: 1494–1559. Pearson Education, Limited.
- Pigaillem, Henri (2008). Anne de Bretagne epouse de Charles VIII et de Louis XII (in French). Pygmalion.
- Potter, David (2008). Renaissance France at War: Armies, Culture and Society, c.1480-1560. The Boydell Press. ISBN 9781843834052.
- Thomas, Jennifer (2016). "Patronage and Personal Narrative in a Music Manuscript: Marguerite of Austria, Katherine of Aragon, and London Royal 8 G.vii". In Lamay, Thomasin (ed.). Musical Voices of Early Modern Women: Many-Headed Melodies. Routledge. pp. 337–364. ISBN 9781351916271.

Charles VIII of France House of Valois Cadet branch of the Capetian dynasty Born: 30 June 1470 Died: 7 April 1498
Regnal titles
Preceded by Louis XI	King of France; 30 August 1483 – 7 April 1498	Succeeded by Louis XII
Preceded by Ferdinand II	King of Naples; 1495	Succeeded by Ferdinand II
French royalty
Vacant Title last held by Francis	Dauphin of France; 1470–1483	Vacant Title next held by Charles Orlando
Titles in pretence
Preceded by Andreas Palaiologos	— TITULAR — Emperor of Constantinople; 1494–1498	Succeeded by Andreas Palaiologos or Louis XII (claimed by both)
