= 1474 in France =

- Decades: 1450s; 1460s; 1470s; 1480s; 1490s
- See also: History of France; Timeline of French history; List of years in France

Events from the year 1474 in France.

== Incumbents ==
- Monarch – Louis XI

== Events ==
- The Treaty of London was signed on 25 July 1474. An alliance was signed between King Edward IV of England and Charles the Bold, Duke of Burgundy, aimed at jointly challenging King Louis XI of France and potentially reviving English claims in France.
- The Treaty of Andernach was agreed in December 1474 by the Holy Roman Emperor, Frederick III, and Louis XI.

== Births ==
- Artus Gouffier, Lord of Boissy

== Deaths ==
- Guillaume Du Fay, Composer of the Renaissance
