= 1475 in France =

- Decades: 1450s; 1460s; 1470s; 1480s; 1490s
- See also: History of France; Timeline of French history; List of years in France

Events from the year 1475 in France.

== Incumbents ==
- Monarch – Louis XI

== Events ==
- 29 August – Treaty of Picquigny agreed between Louis XI and Edward IV
- Unknown – The siege of Perpignan ends with the city taken by Louis XI's forces after a lengthy siege

== Births ==
- Catherine d'Amboise, writer and poet (died 1550)
