= 1484 in France =

- Decades: 1460s; 1470s; 1480s; 1490s; 1500s
- See also: History of France; Timeline of French history; List of years in France

Events from the year 1484 in France.

== Incumbents ==
- Monarch – Charles VIII (as king), Anne of France (as regent)

== Events ==
- January 15 – In Tours, the Estates General of 1484 convenes by order of Anne of France to designate the regent for the period of Charles VIII's minority.
- February 9 – Philippe Pot delivers a speech calling for reforms in the government structure of France, alarming the royal government.
- March 22 – The Auld Alliance between the kingdoms of Scotland and France is renewed.
- May 30 – The coronation of the Charles VIII as King of France at Reims.
- November 23 – Louis, Duke of Orleans and Francis II, Duke of Brittany sign a treaty arranging the marriage of the duke's daughter, Anne of Brittany to Louis. This is contingent the annulment of the latter's marriage to Joan of France, Duchess of Berry.

== Deaths ==
- 21 May – Olivier le Daim, courtier and close advisor of Louis XI of France (born c. 1428)
- 5 July – Hélie de Bourdeilles, Franciscan, Archbishop of Tours and cardinal (born 1423)

=== Full date missing ===
- Guillaume Cousinot de Montreuil, diplomat, magistrate and civil servant (born 1400)
- Philibert Hugonet, roman catholic bishop and cardinal
- Jean Boucard, confessor and chaplain to Louis XI of France
