= Titulus Regius =

Act of the Parliament of England

Titulus Regius (Note: Alison Hanham uses "Act of Settlement" for the 1484 act, retaining Titulus Regis for the 1485 act. David Weil Baker concurs.)
- Act of Parliament
- Parliament of England
- Long title: Titulus Regius, under which title all the reasons and allegations devised to prove the King to be true and undoubted heir to the crown, are set forth at large, and the same allowed, ratified, and enacted by the lords and commons; and his brothers children made bastards. (Note: In Rotuli Parliamentorum, the marginal note for the 1484 act is "An Act for the Settlement of the Crown upon the King and his Issue, with recapitulation of his Title".)
- Citation: 1 Ric. 3 c. 0
- Territorial extent: England and Wales; Ireland

Dates
- Royal assent: 20 February 1484
- Commencement: 23 January 1484 (Note: In this period, acts were backdated to the first day of the parliamentary session.)
- Repealed: 7 November 1485

Other legislation
- Repealed by: Titulus Regis

Status: Repealed

Text of statute as originally enacted

Titulus Regius (Note: Some authors refer to it as "the Titulus Regius" and others as simply "Titulus Regius".) (Latin for "Royal Title" (Note: Title in the sense "legitimate entitlement [to the office]"; as opposed to "style or description [of the holder]".)) or the Act of Settlement is a statute of the Parliament of England issued in 1484 which confirmed the title of King of England which was given to Richard III in 1483.

The act ratified the declaration of the Lords and the members of the House of Commons in June 1483 that because the marriage of Edward IV to Elizabeth Woodville had been invalid under Church law, their children, including Edward, Richard, and Elizabeth, were illegitimate and debarred under English common law from inheriting the throne. The reason stated was that when King Edward had secretly married Elizabeth Woodville in 1464 he had already secretly wed 'and stood married' to Lady Eleanor Butler (née Talbot) who was still living at the time of his 'pretensed marriage' to Elizabeth. The offspring of this bigamous union were illegitimate under Church law (canon law) and the overall effect of bigamy combined with two illicit secret marriages made it impossible for the Church to rectify their status. Edward IV's brother, Richard Duke of Gloucester, being the next legitimate successor, had thus been petitioned to accept the crown and had been proclaimed Richard III on 26 June 1483. Since the Lords and the Commons had not been officially convened as a Parliament at the time of this determination, the Act of Succession, Titulus Regius, containing a copy of the petition, was placed by the same Lords and Commons before their next official session of Parliament in January 1484 so as to eradicate any doubts as to the validity of the king's title and to confirm the succession of his heirs.

Richard III was killed at the Battle of Bosworth Field in August 1485 and succeeded by Henry VII. Henry's 1485 parliament repealed the 1484 act by another act, with the similar name Titulus Regis ("Title of the King"). (Note: Paul R. Cavill distinguishes two bills, a first "short bill which declared but did not explain the king's title" and a second repealing "the infamous Titulus Regius". In Rotuli Parliamentorum, the marginal notes are Titulus Regis ("Title of the King") for the first, and Adnullatio Actus &c. ("Annulment of the Act etc.") for the second.) (Note: A few authors have confusingly used Titulus Regis for the 1484 act rather than the 1485 act.)

== Contents ==
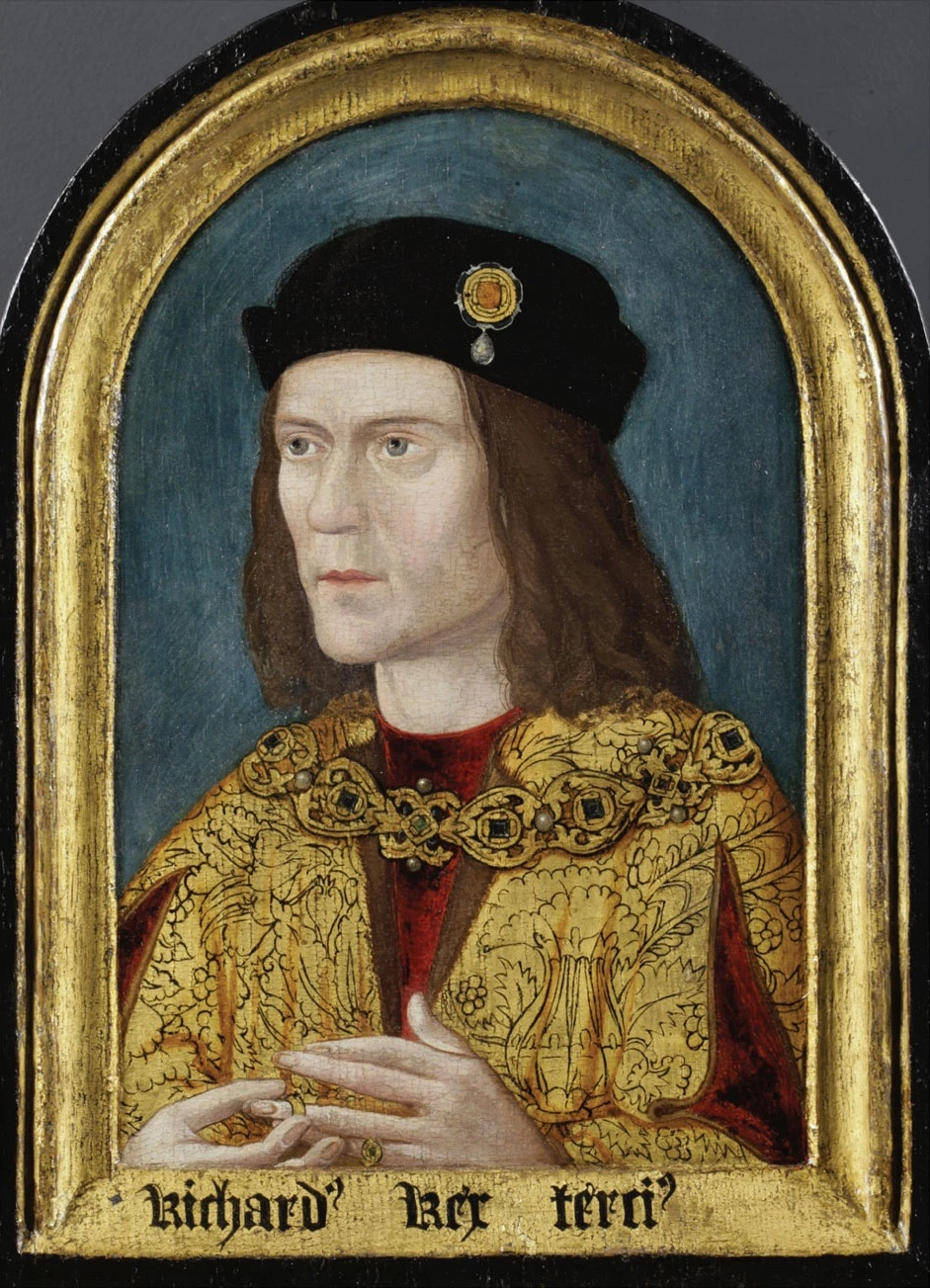
Richard III held Parliament in 1484 which placed on record Titulus Regius which confirmed the legitimacy of his succession to the throne. Society of Antiquaries of London.

Following an introduction explaining its confirmatory purpose, the Act enshrined in its body text the full wording of the petition framed by the Lords and Commons in June 1483 to "the High and Myghty Prince Richard Duc of Gloucester" requesting him to accept the crown by reason of the circumstances that rendered the offspring of Edward IV illegitimate. Edward IV's Woodville marriage had been invalid according to the testimony of a senior bishop, Robert Stillington, Bishop of Bath and Wells, that the king had already secretly married Lady Eleanor Butler and that she had been living when Edward secretly made a 'pretensed marriage' with Elizabeth Woodville:

And how also, that at the time of contract of the same pretensed Marriage, and before and long time after, the said King Edward was and stood married and troth-plight to one Dame Eleanor Butler, Daughter of the old Earl of Shrewsbury, with whom the same King Edward had made a precontract of Matrimony, long time before he made the said pretensed Marriage with the said Elizabeth Grey, (Note: Elizabeth Woodville was the widow of John Grey of Groby when she married Edward.) in manner and form above-said.

The document also claimed that Elizabeth Woodville and her mother had used witchcraft to induce the king to marry her. Since Richard's brother George, Duke of Clarence, had been executed and attainted, his descendants forfeited all rights of inheritance, including succession to the throne, leaving Richard the true heir. The wording used all possible means to stress Richard's legitimacy, being "born within this land" and being "undoubted son and heir of Richard, late Duke of York". This contrasted him with his brothers George and Edward (born in Ireland and Normandy, respectively) about whom there had long been rumours casting doubt on their legitimacy.

Edward's reign was also criticised, he was said to have led by "sensuality and concupiscence" and delighted in "adulation and flattery" and to have been easily influenced by "persons insolent, vicious and of inordinate avarice", a reference to the Woodville family. In contrast, Richard was said to have been a man distinguished by "great wit, prudence, justice, princely courage, and memorable and laudable acts in diverse battles."

== Repeal ==
Titulus Regis
- Act of Parliament
- Parliament of England
- Long title: Titulus Regis
- Citation: 1 Hen. 7 (part preceding c. 1)
- Territorial extent: England and Wales; Ireland

Dates
- Royal assent: 1485
- Commencement: 7 November 1485
- Repealed: 30 July 1948

Other legislation
- Repeals/revokes: Titulus Regius
- Repealed by: Statute Law Revision Act 1948

Status: Repealed

Text of statute as originally enacted

After Richard was killed in battle and the throne was seized by Henry VII, the new king in his first parliament ordered the repeal of Titulus Regius, its removal from the parliamentary record and its destruction unread. This was important to Henry and his supporters because they viewed Richard III as 'king in fact but not by right', therefore they wished to obliterate any record that confirmed his right to the succession. Also Henry VII's prospective wife, Elizabeth of York, whom he had pledged to marry if he gained the throne, was the eldest daughter of Edward IV and Elizabeth Woodville and consequently one of their illegitimate children. He conveyed his displeasure at this situation by describing Titulus Regius to his Justices of the Exchequer as 'the Act that bastardized' Edward IV's offspring, though in fact it was Church law that had rendered them illegitimate. Neither the Act nor its repeal had any effect on his wife's illegitimate status which had been determined in June 1483, and indeed he married her five days before the repeal was enacted.

Henry also ordered the destruction of the Act itself and all copies of it together with all related documents without reading them. His orders were carried out to an extent, but the original parchment membranes were never removed and the Act remains stitched into the Rolls of Parliament exactly as it was engrossed in 1484 and may be seen in The National Archives at Kew (TNA, C65/114, mm. 2-3).

The repealing act was passed in the first Parliament of Henry VII, stating that the original Titulus Regius was

void, adnulled, repelled, irrite [invalidated], and of noe force ne effecte

and that the original be destroyed, and that any copies should be either destroyed or returned to Parliament on pain of fine and imprisonment.

A law report from his reign stated:

that the said Bill, Act and Record, be annulled and utterly destroyed, and that it be ordained by the same Authority, that the same Act and Record be taken out of the Roll of Parliament, and be cancelled and brent ['burned'], and be put in perpetual oblivion.

The 1485 repeal restored the legitimacy of Edward V's reign, which was further implicitly recognised when Henry VII's grandson acceded to the throne in 1547 as Edward VI rather than Edward V. The whole of the 1485 act was repealed by section 1 of, and the first schedule to, the Statute Law Revision Act 1948 (11 & 12 Geo. 6. c. 62), which came into force on 30 July 1948.

== Afterlife ==
Henry almost succeeded in obliterating Titulus Regius. The 100-year gap during which it was suppressed coincided with the ruling period of the Tudor dynasty. It was known that Richard had been offered the crown because a previous marriage invalidated the succession of Edward IV's offspring by his Woodville queen, but no documentary source was known that identified Edward's first wife by name. Thomas More wrote a flawed essay about Richard III in which he asserted that the lady concerned was Edward's long-time mistress, the misnamed Elizabeth Lucy, a view that was repeated until William Camden, Clarenceux Herald, found a manuscript abstract of the Parliament Roll that contained Titulus Regius.

The 1607 revision of Camden's Britannia published the abstract in Latin, and Philemon Holland translated this into English in 1610. In 1611 Titulus Regius was first published in full by the antiquary John Speed in The Theatre of the Empire of Great Britaine. Among official publications, it was included in the 1770s printing of the Parliament Rolls. In 1539 public and private acts were first distinguished on the official enrolments of Acts of Parliament. Retrospectively, Titulus Regius has been classed as a private act, so that editions of the public statutes do not include its text. The Statutes at Large included it in the list of titles of private acts. The Statutes of the Realm and Chronological Table of the Statutes omit private acts altogether; the Chronological Table of Private and Personal Acts begins at 1539. The 1485 repealing act was published in collections of public acts, except for being omitted in Owen Ruffhead's edition of The Statutes at Large.

Titulus Regius has featured in historical detective fiction, often in connection with the disappearance of the Princes in the Tower (Edward V and his brother) during Richard III's reign. Novels set in the present which feature it include Josephine Tey's The Daughter of Time (1951) and Elizabeth Peters' The Murders of Richard III (1974), both absolving the king of the murder of the princes. Novels set during the reign of Henry VIII, when Henry VII's interdict was still in force and copies were rare and hidden, include Jeremy Potter's A Trail of Blood (1970), C. J. Sansom's Sovereign (2007), and Alison Weir's A Dangerous Inheritance (2012).

== See also ==
- Act of Accord (1461), an abortive compromise earlier in the Wars of the Roses, whereby Henry VI would remain king for life but be succeeded not by his descendants but by those of his rival, Richard of York
- Act of Settlement 1701, made Sophia of Hanover heir presumptive to Queen Anne
- Succession crisis, lists various crises, of which legislation tried to settle some

== Sources ==
- Baker, David Weil (September 2007). "Jacobean Historiography and the Election of Richard III". Huntington Library Quarterly. 70 (3): 311–342. doi:10.1525/hlq.2007.70.3.311.
- Strachey, John; Blyke, Richard, eds. (1767–1777). Rotuli Parliamentorum; ut et Petitiones, et Placita in Parliamento. Vol. VI.
