= Lady Eleanor Talbot =

15th-century English noblewoman

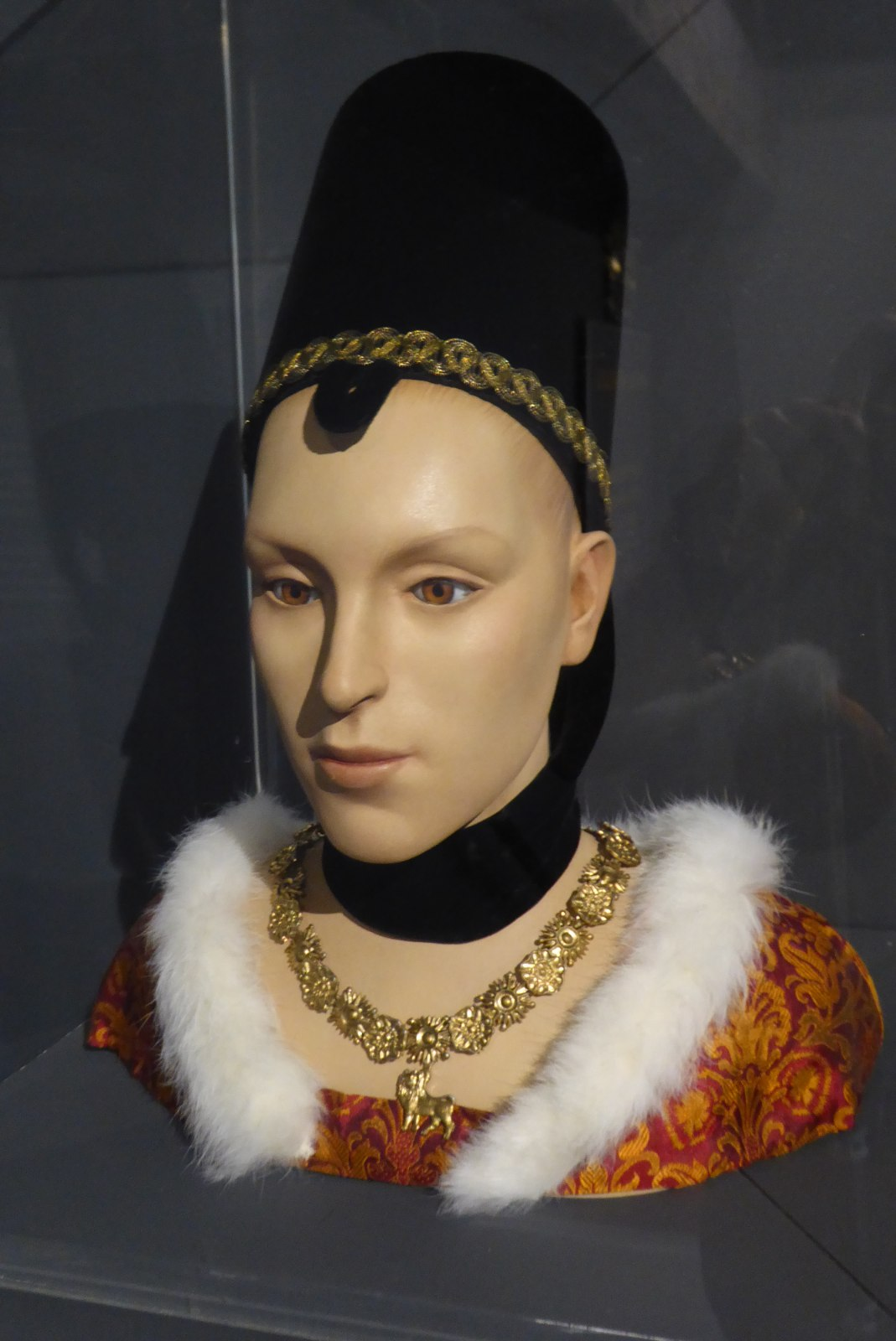
- Bust of Talbot
- Born: c. 1436
- Died: June 1468 (aged 31–32); Norwich, England
- Buried: Whitefriars, Norwich
- Noble family: Talbot
- Spouse: Sir Thomas Butler
- Father: John Talbot, 1st Earl of Shrewsbury
- Mother: Margaret Beauchamp

Lady Eleanor Talbot (c. 1436 – June 1468), also known by her married name Eleanor Butler (or Boteler), was an English noblewoman. She was a daughter of John Talbot, 1st Earl of Shrewsbury. After the death of Edward IV of England in 1483 it was claimed by Robert Stillington, Bishop of Bath and Wells, that she was legally married precontract to Edward, which invalidated the king's later marriage to Elizabeth Woodville. The evidence was examined and the Bishop was questioned by the Three Estates (informal sitting of parliament with the same members), who determined that Bishop Stillington's claim was valid. The finding rendered Edward IV's second secret marriage to Elizabeth Woodville bigamous, thereby making all seven children illegitimate, including Edward's sons, the so-called Princes in the Tower. As the oldest male blood relative of Edward IV, his brother Richard, Duke of Gloucester, was elected by the Three Estates to the throne as Richard III. Edward's sons remained in the royal apartments in the Tower and subsequently disappeared. Various explanations for their disappearance have been put forward.

After the death of Richard at the Battle of Bosworth Field, the new king Henry Tudor married Elizabeth of York, the eldest surviving child of Edward IV, and requested that Parliament repeal the Titulus Regius and destroy all existing copies.

== Known life ==
In 1449, 13-year-old Eleanor married Sir Thomas Butler (or Boteler), son of Ralph Boteler, Lord Sudeley. Thomas died at an unknown date, before Edward IV of England's overthrow of the House of Lancaster on 4 March 1461. Her father-in-law Lord Sudeley took back one of the two manors he had given to her and her husband when they had married, even though he did not have a licence for the transfer. Edward seized both properties after he became king.

Eleanor died in June 1468. She was interred on 30 June in Norwich.

== Allegations ==
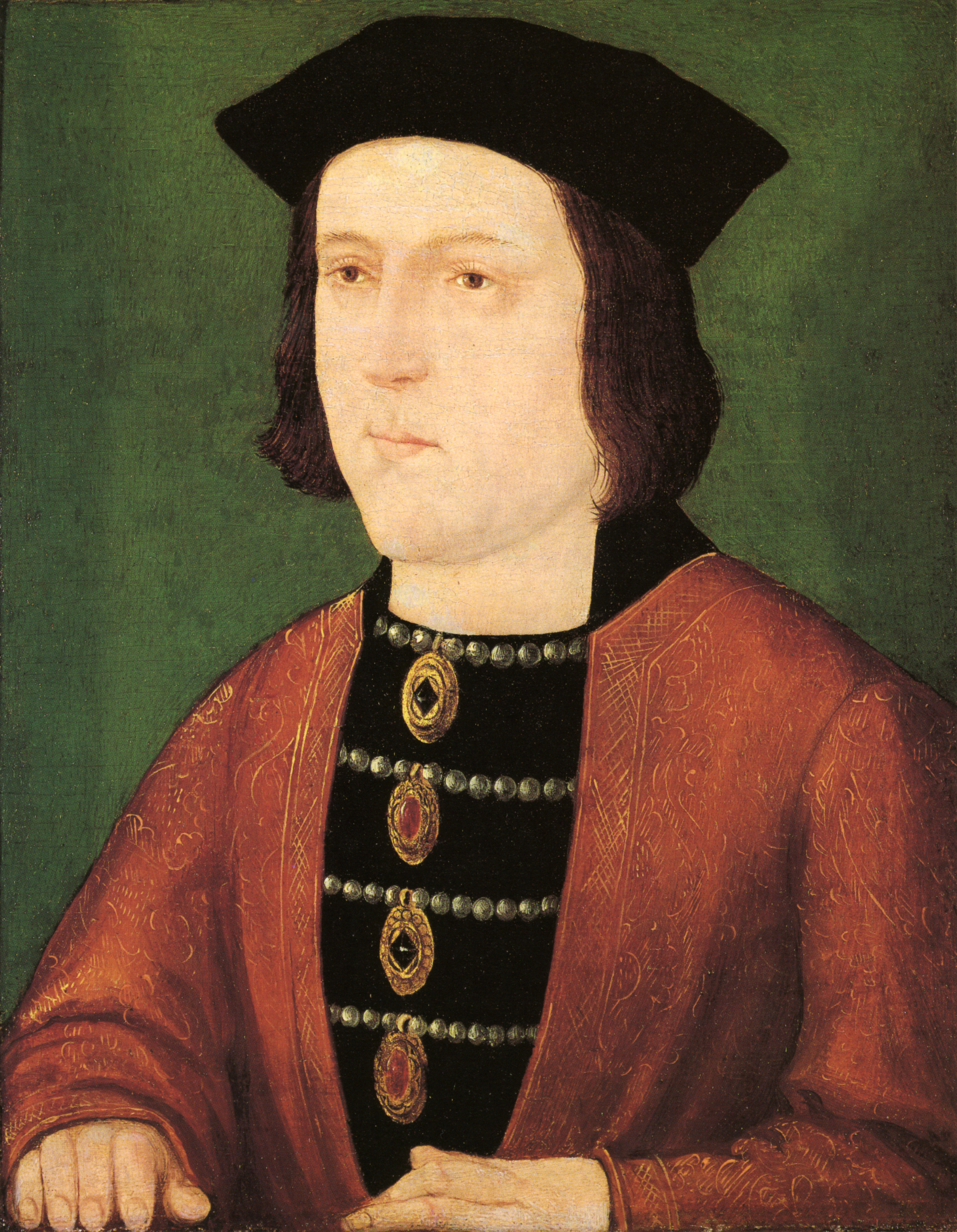
Edward IV, alleged to have precontracted marriage to Eleanor Talbot

After King Edward's death in 1483, his brother Richard, Duke of Gloucester, was appointed protector to the as-yet-uncrowned king Edward V. Richard placed Edward and his younger brother in the Tower of London. He then proclaimed that they were illegitimate. According to the French chronicler Philippe de Commines he acted with the support of Robert Stillington, Bishop of Bath and Wells. Stillington had been briefly imprisoned and fined for speaking out against Edward IV in 1478. Commines later wrote,

The bishop discovered to the Duke of Gloucester that his brother king Edward had been formerly in love with a beautiful young lady and had promised her marriage upon condition that he might lie with her; the lady consented, and, as the bishop affirmed, he married them when nobody was present but they two and himself. His fortune depending on the court, he did not discover it, and persuaded the lady likewise to conceal it, which she did, and the matter remained a secret.

Richard then persuaded Parliament to pass an act, Titulus Regius, which debarred Edward V from the throne and proclaimed himself as King Richard III. At a meeting held on 23 January 1484 the former king's marriage was declared illegal. The document states:

And howe also, that at the tyme of contract of the same pretensed Mariage, and bifore and longe tyme after, the seid King Edward was and stode maryed and trouth plight to oone Dame Elianor Butteler, Doughter of the old Earl of Shrewesbury, with whom the same King Edward had made a precontracte of Matrimonie, longe tyyme bifore he made the said pretensed Mariage with the said Elizabeth Grey, in maner and fourme abovesaid.

Opponents of Richard declared that the precontract was fiction. Richard's leading enemy, Henry Tudor, allied himself with Elizabeth Woodville, promising to re-legitimise her children if Richard was overthrown. After Henry's army defeated and killed Richard at the Battle of Bosworth Field on 22 August 1485, he came to the throne as Henry VII. He ordered the copy of Titulus Regius in parliamentary records to be destroyed, along with all others (one copy was later found to have survived).

Stillington later joined the rebellion of Lambert Simnel against Henry in 1487. He was arrested and imprisoned in the Tower until his death in 1491.

== Possible issue ==
It was suggested that Eleanor had given birth to a child, possibly fathered by King Edward IV, shortly before her death.

== Views of historians ==
Because Commines does not name the "beautiful young lady", and the official copy of Titulus Regius in parliament had been destroyed, Tudor historians confused Talbot with Edward's long-standing mistress Elizabeth Lucy (also known as Elizabeth Wayte), the probable mother of Edward IV's bastard son, Arthur Plantagenet, 1st Viscount Lisle. Thomas More, in his life of Richard III, states that Lucy was interrogated at the time of Edward's marriage to Elizabeth Woodville, because Edward's mother was strongly opposed to the marriage and had suggested that Edward was pre-contracted to Lucy. But Lucy denied that any contract had been made. More says that Richard revived the claim after Edward's death.

George Buck, who found the only surviving copy of Titulus Regius, was the first to identify Eleanor Talbot as the woman in question. Buck, a defender of Richard, accepted the validity of the precontract. His view has been followed by many defenders of Richard since, including Horace Walpole and Clements Markham. Later Ricardians have also either accepted it as fact, or argued that Richard sincerely believed it to be true. It is also commonly argued by Ricardians that Stillington was imprisoned by Edward IV in 1478 because he incautiously spoke of the precontract to George, Duke of Clarence.

Other historians have been more sceptical. John A. Wagner states that "most modern historians believe the precontract to be a fabrication devised to give Richard III's usurpation a veneer of legitimacy. The betrothal cannot be documented beyond the account rehearsed in Titulus Regius, and Richard never attempted to have the precontract authenticated by a church court, the proper venue for such a case". Anne Crawford takes the view that any actual precontract with Eleanor Talbot is unlikely. If it had occurred before her marriage to Thomas Butler it would have been invalidated by the marriage. She suggests that the story may have originated with discussions between Edward's father Richard, Duke of York, and Eleanor's father John Talbot, 1st Earl of Shrewsbury, of a possible marriage, while both men were serving in France. But even that "seems hardly likely". Any valid precontract would most likely have been made in the early phase of Edward's reign, but the fact that Eleanor did not come forward when Edward married his queen militates against it. She also considers it odd that Eleanor's family did not support Richard's claims about the precontract. Since Edward was "not stupid enough" to have been unaware that any precontact would threaten his children's claim to the throne, if it had existed he could easily have applied to the Pope to free himself of it, which would have been the action of "any prudent king and his advisors". Michael Alexander argues that a precontract of marriage to Eleanor Talbot would not have affected the legitimacy of Edward's sons, since they were born after she died, her death negating any marriage.

However, according to Helmholz (1986), canon law in this situation would not mitigate the illegitimacy of Edward's sons as, if the pre-contract existed, it would have meant that adultery had taken place on the part of Edward with Elizabeth. As such the illegitimacy could not be overcome by the death of Eleanor before the birth of Elizabeth's sons, even if Edward and Elizabeth married 'again' after Eleanor's death.

Even if there was no formal precontract it is possible that Eleanor Talbot's name was used because she was known to have been one of the king's lovers. According to Thomas More, Edward had three "concubines" to whom he referred as the "merriest", the "wiliest" and "the holiest harlot in the realm" (who was always in church when she wasn't in bed with the king). More names the "merriest" as Jane Shore, but does not name the others because they were of higher social status ("somewhat greater personages"). It has been speculated that Elizabeth Lucy and Eleanor Talbot were the other two. Her loss of property after the death of her husband may have initiated the affair. Michael Hicks suggests that King Edward was liable to give "benefits" in exchange for sex: "Three young widows, Eleanor Butler, Elizabeth Lucy and Elizabeth Wydeville [Woodville], may have bought concrete benefits from Edward IV with their sexual favours".
