= 1478 in France =

- Decades: 1450s; 1460s; 1470s; 1480s; 1490s
- See also: History of France; Timeline of French history; List of years in France

Events from the year 1478 in France.

== Incumbents ==
- Monarch – Louis XI

== Events ==
- January – King Louis XI signs the treaty of Moatier with the Republic of Venice.

== Births ==
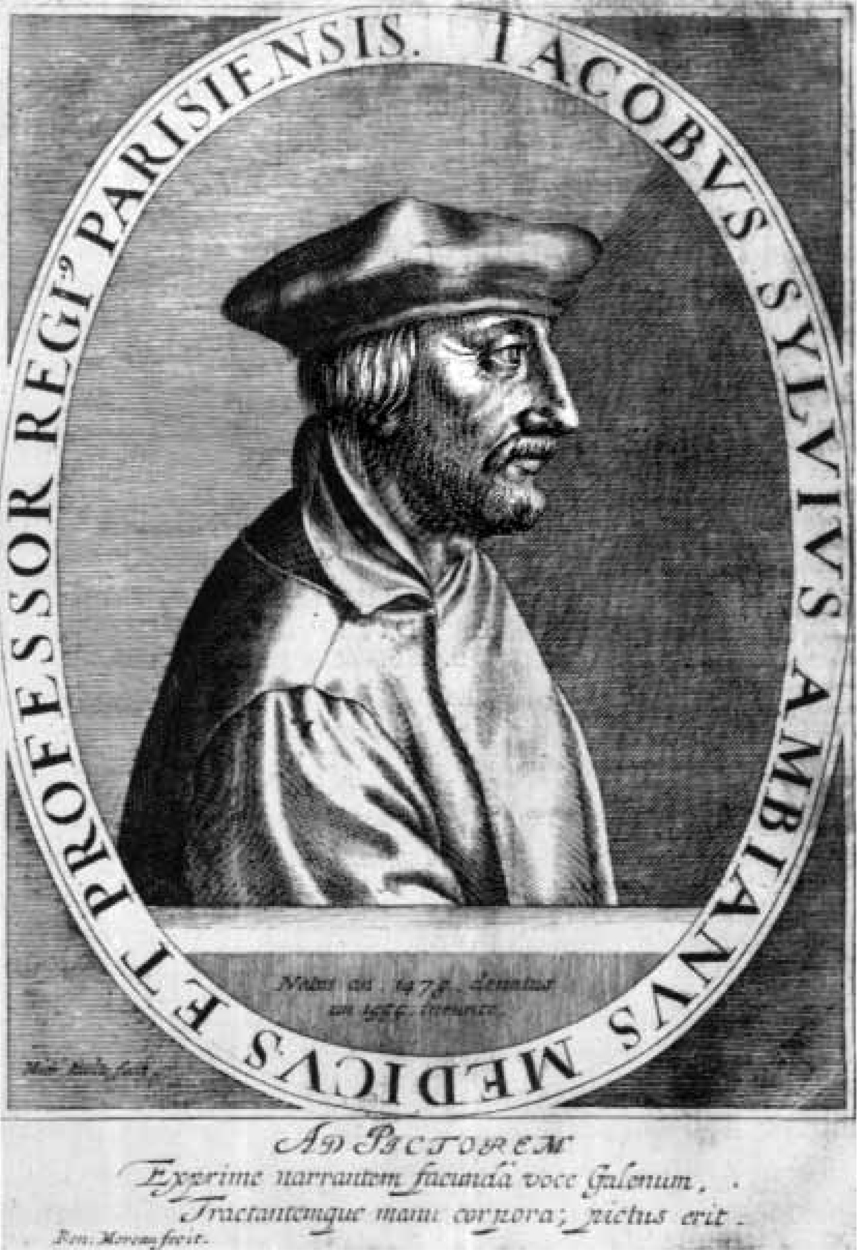
Jacques Dubois

=== Full date missing ===
- Jacques Dubois, anatomist (died 1555).
- Jan Gossaert, paintre

== Deaths ==
=== Full date missing ===
- John VIII, Count of Vendôme, nobleman (born 1425)
- Joachim Rouault, soldier
- Yolande of Valois
