= 1483 in France =

- Decades: 1460s; 1470s; 1480s; 1490s; 1500s
- See also: History of France; Timeline of French history; List of years in France

Events from the year 1483 in France.

== Incumbents ==
- Monarch – Louis XI (until August 30), then Charles VIII

== Events ==
- 30 August –
  - Louis XI after bouts of apoplexy and years of illness dies. He is interred in the Basilica of Notre-Dame de Cléry in Cléry-Saint-André in the Arrondissement of Orléans.
  - Charles VIII becomes King of France at thirteen years of age after the death of his father Louis XI.
  - Louis XI's eldest daughter, Anne, becomes regent on Charles VIII's behalf.
- November – Following the Buckingham's Rebellion, some 500 Englishmen fled to Rennes, the capital of Brittany to join Henry Tudor in exile.

== Births ==
=== Full date missing ===
- Jacquet of Mantua, composer (died 1559)
- Robert Céneau, bishop and historian (died 1560)

== Deaths ==
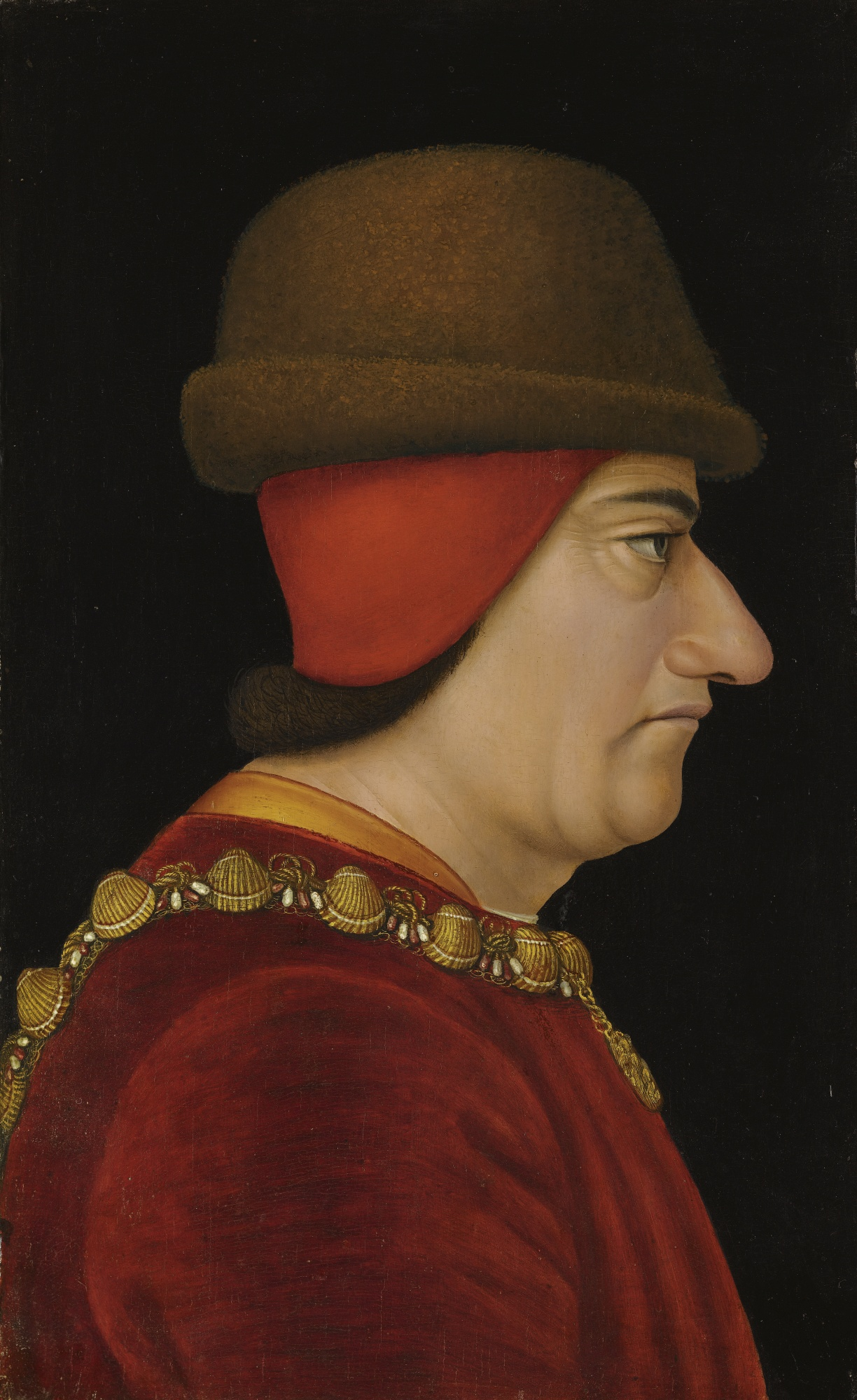
Louis XI, King of France 1461-1483

- 30 August – Louis XI (born 1423).

=== Full date missing ===
- Guillaume d'Estouteville, monk, bishop and cardinal (born 1403/1412)
- Charlotte of Savoy, queen consort (born 1441)
- Yolande, Duchess of Lorraine (born 1428)
