= 1472 in France =

- Decades: 1450s; 1460s; 1470s; 1480s; 1490s
- See also: History of France; Timeline of French history; List of years in France

Events from the year 1472 in France.

== Incumbents ==
- Monarch – Louis XI

== Events ==
- Charles the Bold, Duke of Burgundy, invaded northern France during his conflict with King Louis XI of France. Burgundian forces ravaged Picardy and Normandy, burning towns and countryside to pressure the French crown.

== Births ==
- Marie De Luxembourg, Saint-Pol

== Deaths ==
- Charles of Valois, Duke of Berry
