= 1482 in France =

- Decades: 1460s; 1470s; 1480s; 1490s; 1500s
- See also: History of France; Timeline of French history; List of years in France

Events from the year 1482 in France.

== Incumbents ==
- Monarch – Louis XI

== Events ==
- 23 December – Treaty of Arras is signed between King Louis XI and Habsburg emperor Maximilian I of Austria, resolving the War of the Burgundian Succession.

== Births ==
=== Date Unknown ===
- Charlotte Gouffier, royal governess.

== Deaths ==
- 25 August – Margaret of Anjou, French noblewoman and Queen of England between 1445 to1461.(b.1430)
- 30 August – Louis de Bourbon, Bishop of Liège. (b.1438)

=== Date Unknown ===
- Joan of France, Duchess of Bourbon. (b.1435)
