= 1480 in France =

- Decades: 1460s; 1470s; 1480s; 1490s; 1500s
- See also: History of France; Timeline of French history; List of years in France

Events from the year 1480 in France.

== Incumbents ==
- Monarch – Louis XI

== Events ==
- 3 January – King Louis XI buys the succession rights to the Duchy of Brittany for 50,000 livres.

== Births ==
- 10 April – Philibert II of Savoy, Duke of Savoy (died 1504)

=== Full date missing ===
- Charlotte of Albret, noblewoman and regent (died 1514)
- Louis I d'Orléans, duc de Longueville, Grand Chamberlain of France and governor of Provence (died 1516)
- François Poncher, Bishop of Paris (died 1532)
- Petrus Sutor, theologian and carthusian monk (died 1537)
- Barthélemy de Chasseneuz, jurist (died 1541)
- François Guillaume de Castelnau-Clermont-Ludève, diplomat and cardinal (died 1541)
- Pierre Caroli, theologian and religious figure during the Reformation (died after 1545)
- Charles de Solier, comte de Morette, soldier, diplomat and gentilhomme de la chambre to Francis I of France (died 1552)

== Deaths ==
- 10 July – René of Anjou, Duke of Anjou and Count of Provence (born 1409)

=== Full date missing ===
- February – Anne of Savoy, princess of Squillace, Altamura, and Taranto (born 1455)
- Nicolas Jenson, pioneer, printer and type designer (born c. 1420)
