= 1481 in France =

- Decades: 1460s; 1470s; 1480s; 1490s; 1500s
- See also: History of France; Timeline of French history; List of years in France

Events from the year 1481 in France.

== Incumbents ==
- Monarch – Louis XI

== Events ==
- 10 December – The Duchy of Anjou and the Provence revert to the French crown.

== Births ==
=== Full date missing ===
- Claude de Longwy de Givry, bishop and Cardinal (died 1561)

== Deaths ==
- 22 February – Charles I d'Amboise, politician and military figure (born 1430)
- 10 December – Charles IV of Anjou, nobleman from House of Valois-Anjou (born 1446)

=== Full date missing ===
- Frances de Châtillon, Countess of Périgord and Viscountess of Limoges
- Jean Fouquet, painter and miniaturist (born c. 1420)
