= Treaty of London (1474) =

1474 alliance between England and Burgundy

The Treaty of London (French: Traités de Londres) was an agreement between Charles the Bold of Burgundy and King Edward IV of England signed on 25 July 1474. In the treaty, Charles agreed to support England militarily during an invasion of France, and to recognise Edward as the King of France.

== Background ==
Following the beginning of the Wars of the Roses in 1455, England was not in a position to pursue its claim to the French throne. Edward's position as King had been unstable during his first reign and was troubled by the war's progression in the 1460s. Edward was temporarily removed in 1470 and replaced with Lancastrian Henry VI. By 1471, Henry VI and his son Prince Edward had died, allowing Edward IV to reclaim the throne. Now with a more secure domestic situation, Edward IV was preparing to launch a military campaign against France, possibly in the hopes of regaining some of the territories which had been lost in the Hundred Years War. It is unclear how serious Edward's intentions were to invade France, but his preparations for the war faced resistance from the English parliament. Additionally, there was a lack of support from allies Brittany and Burgundy.

== Treaty ==
Initially, Burgundy was unwilling to support England's plans, and an attempt to reach an agreement at Bruges in August 1473 proved unsuccessful. However, on 25 July 1474, Charles and Edward signed the Treaty of London, ensuring Burgundian support for the English invasion of France. Edward agreed that Burgundy could retain all of its sovereign territories, along with some territorial claims in France, as long as it recognized him as King of France and supported the invasion that was to happen before 1 July 1475.

== Outcome ==
English troops landed at Calais in France in June 1475. However, Burgundy failed to deliver the support that had been promised, and Brittany also could not offer help. It was also relatively late in the campaigning season and Edward was not eager to engage in battle. Louis XI was happy to bribe Edward to leave and offered a lucrative agreement which included pensions for many important nobles. This agreement was formalised in the Treaty of Picquigny, which ordered the withdrawal of the English troops in exchange for 75,000 crowns and additional annual payments.

== In popular culture ==
The comedy film Passport to Pimlico (1949) revolves around the post-World War II discovery of a secret clause in Edward and Charles' treaty, which allows a small neighbourhood of London to proclaim itself a revived Burgundian State.
