= 1473 in France =

- Decades: 1450s; 1460s; 1470s; 1480s; 1490s
- See also: History of France; Timeline of French history; List of years in France

Events from the year 1473 in France.

== Incumbents ==
- Monarch – Louis XI

== Events ==
- 23 February – Charles the Bold gained the titles of Duke of Guelders and Count of Zutphen.
- 3 November – Peter II, Duke of Bourbon married Anne of France.

=== Full dates missing ===
- Constructions of the western tower of Saint-Omer Cathedral was started.

== Births ==
=== Full dates missing ===
- Charles II d'Amboise, French noble (died 1511)
- René of Savoy, French noble (died 1525)

== Deaths ==
- 6 March – John V, Count of Armagnac (born 1420)
- 28 June – Pierre d'Amboise, French noble (born 1408)
- 27 July – Nicholas I, Duke of Lorraine (born 1448)

=== Full dates missing ===
- Jean Juvénal des Ursins, French clergy (born 1388)
- Anne of Armagnac, French noble (born 1402)
- Jean Jouffroy, French prelate and diplomat (born 1412)
- Marie de Valois, illegitimate daughter of Charles VII of France (born 1444)
- Garsias de La Mothe, French clergy (birth year unknown)
- Guillaume Fillastre, Burgundian politician (birth year unknown)
