= 1476 in France =

- Decades: 1450s; 1460s; 1470s; 1480s; 1490s
- See also: History of France; Timeline of French history; List of years in France

Events from the year 1476 in France.

== Incumbents ==
- Monarch – Louis XI

== Events ==
- 2 March – Charles the Bold suffers a defeat at the hands of Swiss forces at the Battle of Grandson
- 22 June – Charles is defeated a second time at the Battle of Morat
- 8 September – The future Louis XII marries his cousin Joan of France

== Births ==
- 11 September – Louise of Savoy, regent of France (died 1531)
