= Elizabeth Lucy =

Misnamed possible mistress of King Edward IV of England

Elizabeth Lucy, also known as Lady Lucy, Lady Elizabeth, and Elizabeth Wayte, daughter of Thomas Wayte of Hampshire, (born ca. 1445) was the possible mistress of King Edward IV of England, and possible mother of several children by him, including Arthur Plantagenet, 1st Viscount Lisle. Arthur was known in his youth as Arthur Wayte. He was elevated to the title, Viscount Lisle, by Henry VII.

== Accounts of her life ==
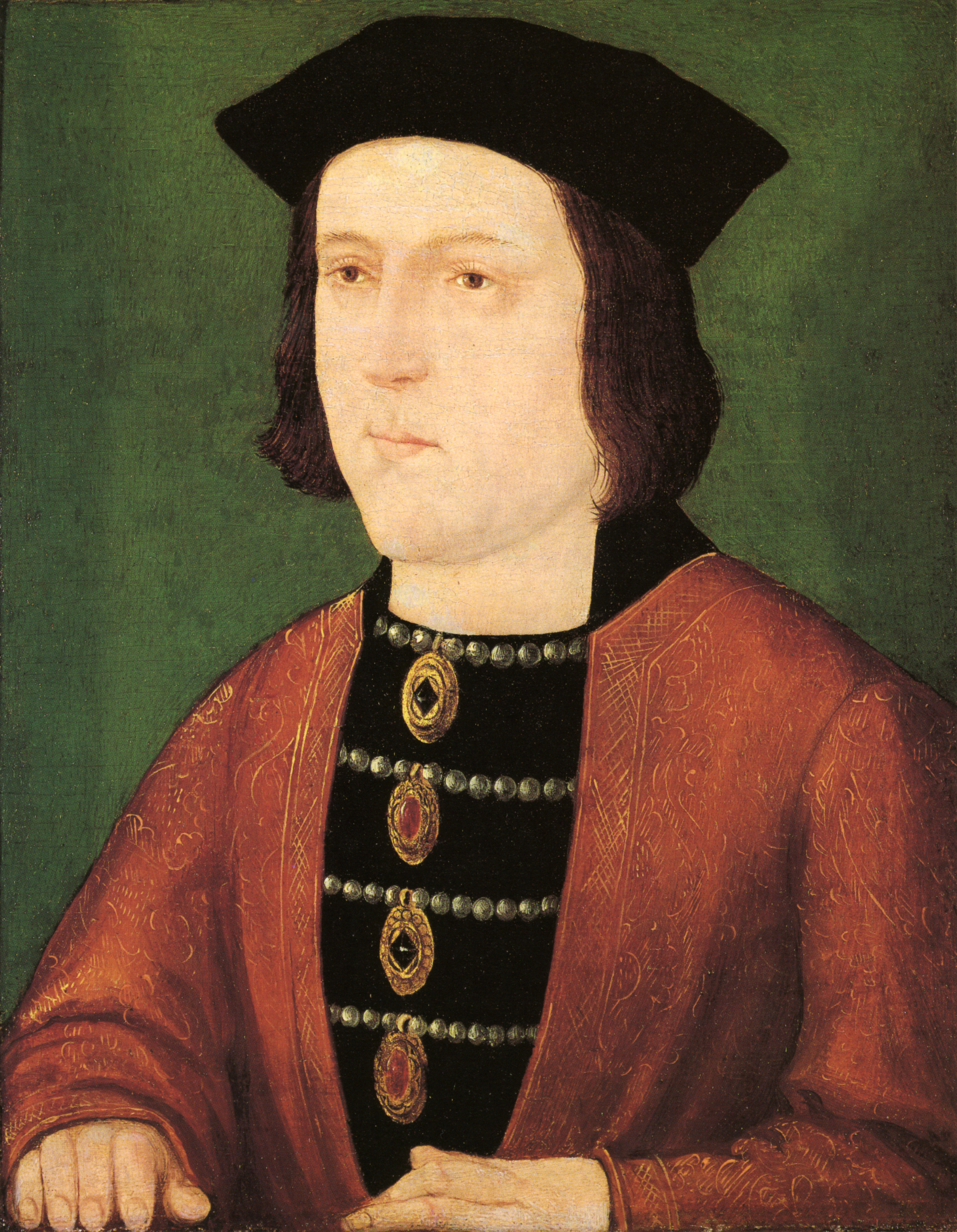
Elizabeth's lover Edward IV

Lucy's family background is not known. The Victorian historian James Gairdner refers to her as a "courtesan of obscure birth". However, Thomas More calls her "dame" Elizabeth, portraying her as a naive girl seduced by Edward. He states that Edward's mother, enraged by her son's marriage to Elizabeth Woodville after he had already made Lucy pregnant, had stated that Lucy was legally engaged to him ("precontracted"). Lucy denied they had been officially engaged but said,

"his grace spoke such loving words to her, she verily hoped he would have married her, and if it had not been for such kind words she would never have shown such kindness to let him to kindly get her with child."

More goes on to assert that Richard III later revived the claim in order to declare Edward's children by Elizabeth illegitimate, and thereby take the throne for himself. However, it was later discovered that Richard had in fact named Eleanor Butler as Edward's precontracted wife. Butler was already dead, and could not therefore be questioned about the claim.

The 17th-century historian George Buck portrays Lucy differently from More, depicting her as a sexually uninhibited young woman. Edward "loved her well, and she was his witty concubine, for she was a wanton wench and willing and ready to yield herself to the king and his pleasures without conditions."

== Elizabeth Wayte ==
The 18th century antiquarian John Anstis in The Register of the Most Noble Order of the Garter (London, 1724) identified her with "Elizabeth Wayte", the daughter of Thomas Wayte of Southampton, saying she was the mother of Arthur Plantagenet. Bridget Boland suggests that Edward may have met her while travelling in the south of England in 1461. Chris Given Wilson and Alice Curteis also equate her with Wayte, saying that her son was probably born sometime between 1461 and 1464. The name "Lucy" is presumed to derive from a later marriage, though Michael Hicks suggests she was a "young widow" when she met Edward.

While it remains unclear whether or not Wayte and Lucy are identical, it is widely believed Lucy was also the mother of Elizabeth Plantagenet (born circa 1464), who married Sir Thomas Lumley in 1477. She may also have been the mother of other children by the king.
