= 1477 in France =

- Decades: 1450s; 1460s; 1470s; 1480s; 1490s
- See also: History of France; Timeline of French history; List of years in France

Events from the year 1477 in France.

== Incumbents ==
- Monarch – Louis XI

== Events ==
- 5 January – Battle of Nancy

== Births ==
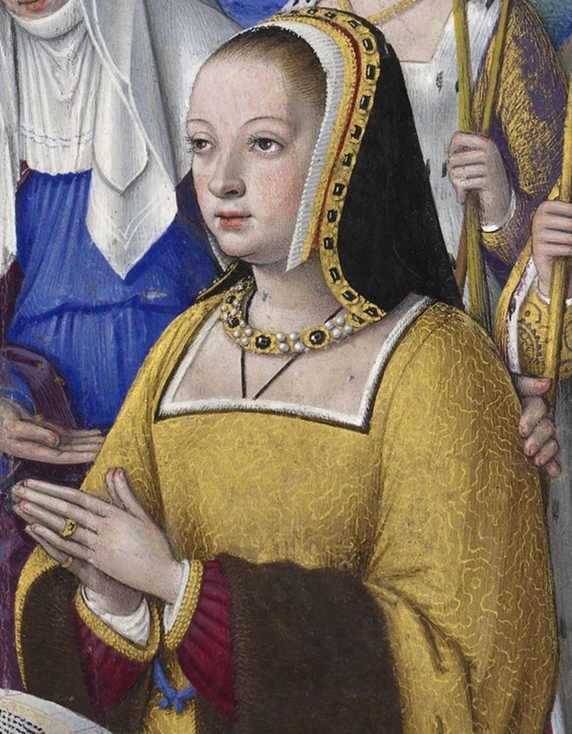
Anne of Brittany

- 25 January – Anne of Brittany, Duchess of Brittany (died 1514).

== Deaths ==
=== Full date missing ===
- Johannes Fedé, composer (born c, 1415)
- Louis II de Beaumont-Bressuire, chamberlain (born 1407)
- Charles the Bold, Duke of Burgundy (born 1433)
- Jean V de Bueil, count of Sancerre, viscount of Carentan (born 1406)
