= 1479 in France =

- Decades: 1450s; 1460s; 1470s; 1480s; 1490s
- See also: History of France; Timeline of French history; List of years in France

Events from the year 1479 in France.

== Incumbents ==
- Monarch – Louis XI

== Events ==
- 7 August – A French army is defeated at the Battle of Guinegate

== Births ==
- Unknown – Claude Chevallon, printer (died 1537)
