= Treaty of Picquigny =

1475 Franco-English peace treaty

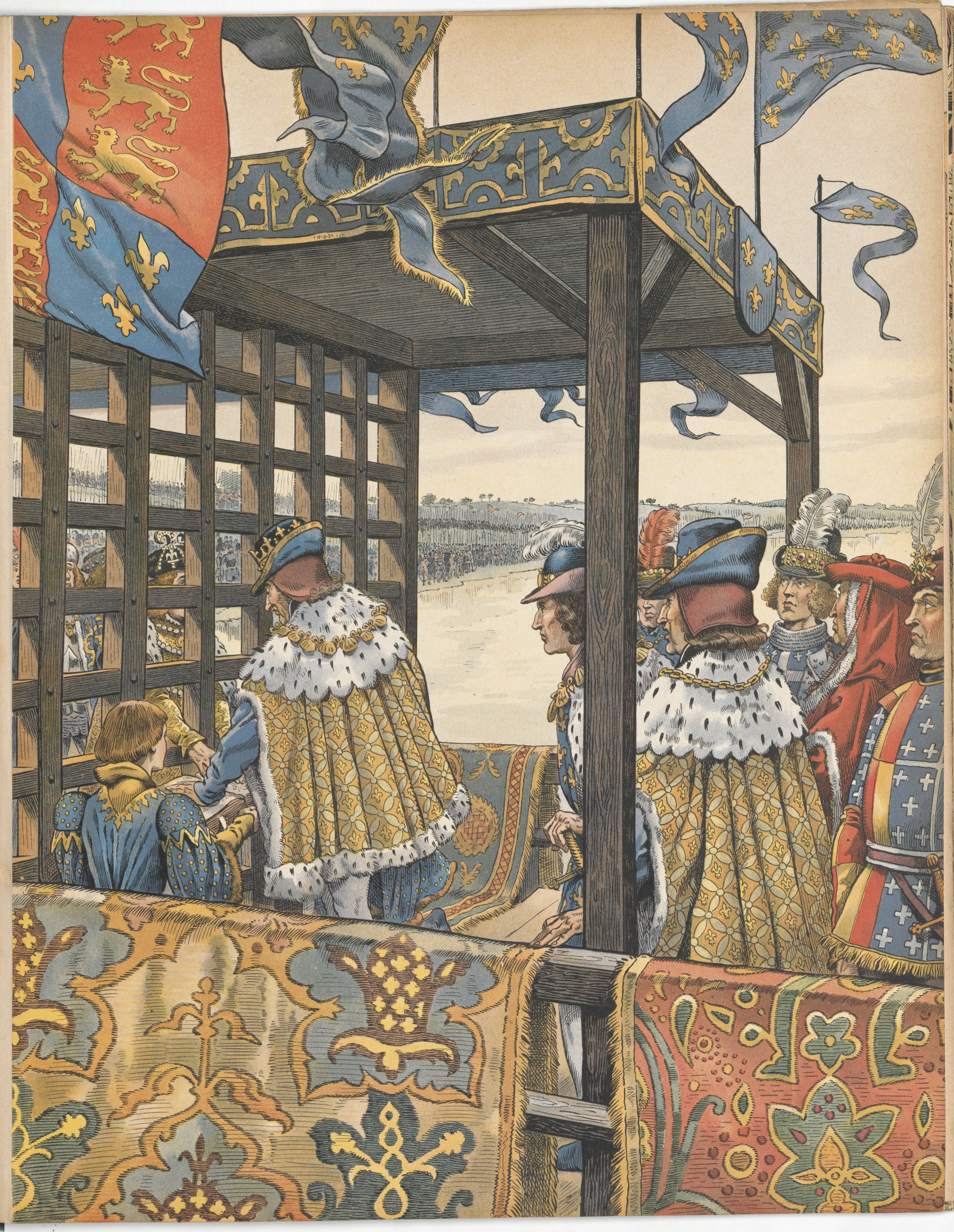
meeting between King Louis XI and King Edward IV.

The Treaty of Picquigny was a peace treaty negotiated on 29 August 1475 between the Kingdom of England and the Kingdom of France. It followed from an invasion of France by Edward IV of England in alliance with Burgundy and Brittany. It left Louis XI of France free to solve the threat posed by Charles the Bold, Duke of Burgundy. The treaty also formally ended the Hundred Years' War, which had been informally finished since 1453.

== Background ==
Following the Treaty of London in 1474, Charles the Bold, Duke of Burgundy, had agreed to aid England with an invasion of France. By June 1475, Edward IV had landed on the coast of France. Edward IV had an army of around 11,000 and a further 2,000 archers from Brittany. Edward's plan was to march through Burgundian territory to Reims. However Charles failed to provide the support he had promised, and refused to allow the English to enter Burgundian-controlled towns. Edward also received little support from his other ally Francis II, Duke of Brittany.

Louis then sent Edward word that he was willing to offer more than Edward's allies could. He contacted and induced Edward to negotiate a settlement. The two negotiated by meeting on a specially-made bridge with a wooden grill-barrier between the sides, at Picquigny, just outside Amiens.

== Treaty ==
The negotiations led to an agreement signed on 29 August 1475. The two kings agreed to a seven-year truce and free trade between the two countries. Louis XI was to pay Edward IV 75,000 crowns upfront, on the condition that he return to England and not take up arms to pursue his claim to the French throne. He would then receive a yearly pension thereafter of 50,000 crowns. Also the King of France was to ransom the deposed English queen, Margaret of Anjou, who was in Edward's custody, with 50,000 crowns. It also included pensions to many of Edward's lords.

Other terms of the treaty were that if either king experienced a rebellion, the other would provide military support to defeat it. Edward's daughter Elizabeth of York was to marry the Dauphin Charles when she came of age. The English claim to the French throne was to be subject to arbitration along with other disagreements between the monarchs. A committee should meet annually to discuss the issues and their conclusions should be binding. It was to comprise the archbishops of Canterbury and Lyons, Edward's brother George, the Duke of Clarence, and Louis, Count of Dunois.

In addition to the king, his leading advisors also received pensions from the French. Thomas Rotherham the chancellor had 1,000 crowns a year. John Morton had 600 crowns, and Sir John Howard and Sir Thomas Montgomery 1,200 each. William Hastings, 1st Baron Hastings, who had been the chief advocate for the treaty, was to receive 2,000 crowns a year.

== Commines report ==
The details of the negotiations are related by the chronicler Philippe de Commines, who says that the Duke of Gloucester (later King Richard III) was opposed to the treaty, considering it dishonourable. He refused to participate in the negotiations. However, he joined the celebrations in Amiens after it was concluded. Commines also relays a series of sarcastic comments made by the French king about Edward's notorious womanising, as well as his fear of the English because of the events of the Hundred Years' War.

The apparent bribery in the treaty led to some disaffection on both sides. A number of commentators, both English and French, considered it dishonourable. Louis de Bretaylle, English envoy to Spain, confided that this one shady deal took away the honour of all Edward's previous military victories.
