= Robert Stillington =

15th-century Bishop of Bath and Wells and Chancellor of England

- Bishop of Bath and Wells
- Appointed: 30 October 1465
- Term ended: May 1491
- Predecessor: Thomas Beckington
- Successor: Richard Foxe

Orders
- Consecration: 16 March 1466

Personal details
- Born: about 1405 Nether Acaster, Yorkshire, England
- Died: before June 1491
- Denomination: Catholic

Robert Stillington (about 1405 – May 1491) was an English cleric and administrator who was Bishop of Bath and Wells from 1465 and twice served as Lord Chancellor under King Edward IV. In 1483, he was instrumental in the accession of King Richard III, which led to later reprisals against him under King Henry VII.

== Life ==
Stillington was Archdeacon of Taunton (1450–1465) and Archdeacon of Berkshire (1464–1465) when he was made Keeper of the Privy Seal from 1460 to 1467.

Stillington was selected as Bishop of Bath and Wells on 30 October 1465, and was consecrated on 16 March 1466. He was appointed Lord Chancellor on 20 June 1467 and held the office until 29 September 1470, when Henry VI was restored to the throne. After the return of Edward IV, he was reappointed to his former office and held it until 18 June 1473, when Edward dismissed him.

In 1478, Stillington spent some weeks in prison, apparently as a result of some association with the disgraced George, Duke of Clarence. It has been suggested that he gave Clarence information about the king's prior common law association with a mistress Lady Eleanor Talbot, information that would have put Clarence in a position to claim the throne for himself.

After Edward's death in April 1483, Stillington was a member of the council of the boy-king Edward V. Some time in June, a clergyman, identified as Stillington only by the writings [Mémoires, book VI chapter 17] of the French diplomat Philippe de Commines, who referred to him as levesque de Bas (bishop of Bath) and ce mauvais evesque (this bad bishop), told Richard, Duke of Gloucester, the Lord Protector, that the marriage of Edward IV and Elizabeth Woodville had been invalid on the grounds of Edward's earlier marriage to Lady Eleanor Talbot at which he claimed to have officiated. That led to Elizabeth Woodville's children by Edward IV being declared illegitimate and the Duke of Gloucester ascending the throne as Richard III.

After Henry VII defeated Richard III at Bosworth in 1485, he immediately had Stillington imprisoned again. Henry had the bigamy charge against Edward IV reversed and married Edward's daughter, Elizabeth of York.

Some years after Stillington's second release, he became involved in the plot to place the impostor Lambert Simnel on the throne in 1487. After finding refuge at Oxford University, he was eventually handed over to the king and imprisoned. He was buried in a chapel of his own founding, since demolished, at Wells Cathedral.

== Citations ==
Political offices
Preceded by Laurence Booth	Lord Privy Seal; 1460–1467	Succeeded by Thomas Rotheram
Preceded by George Neville	Lord Chancellor; 1467–1470	Succeeded by George Neville
Preceded by George Neville	Lord Chancellor; 1471–1473	Succeeded by Lawrence Booth
Catholic Church titles
Preceded by Thomas Beckington	Bishop of Bath and Wells; 1466–1491	Succeeded by Richard Foxe
