= Jean Boucard =

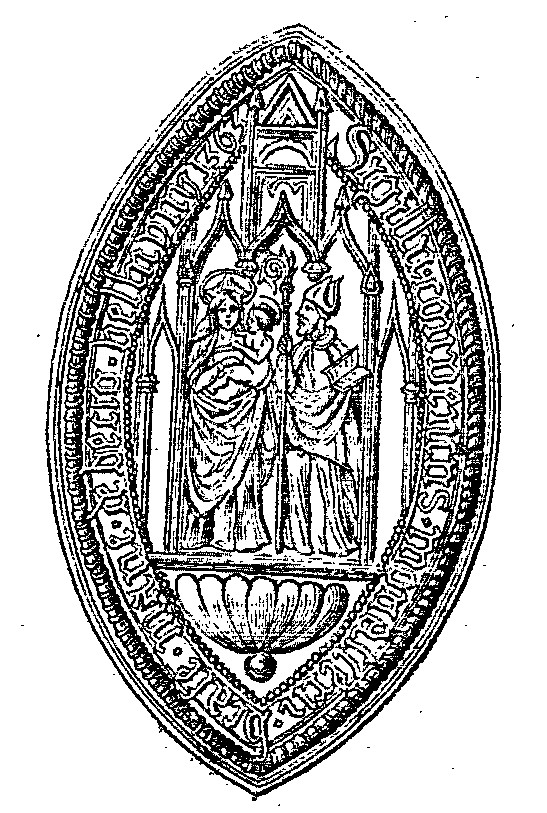
Seal Abbaye du Bec.

Jean de Boucard (died 28 November 1484) was a French prelate, who was confessor and chaplain to Louis XI of France.

== Biography ==
He was a Doctor of theology, and was a Canon and archdeacon of Avranches, before he took charge of the bishopric of this city in 1458.

Confessor and chaplain to Louis XI of France, the king entrusted him with the office of rector of the University of Paris to reform it.

Boucard pushed the king to take the side of the realists against the nominals, which he did by the Edict of Senlis in 1473.

In 1476, he received in commende the abbey of Becand and took office July 13, 1477. He was also abbot of Cormery. A career bureaucrat he was rarely present in the Abbey, delegating to the dean of the chapter, John the Merchant. He wanted to resign in favour of Jean Hautements d'Aptot, but died in this office on 28 November 1484.

One year prior to his death he received by letters of 29 November 1483 from Louis XII a one-year confession for the Abbey at Bec Hellouin. This was a nomial position granted as a support, a type of pension in view of his age and debilitation.
