= Edward IV =

King of England (1461–1470; 1471–1483)

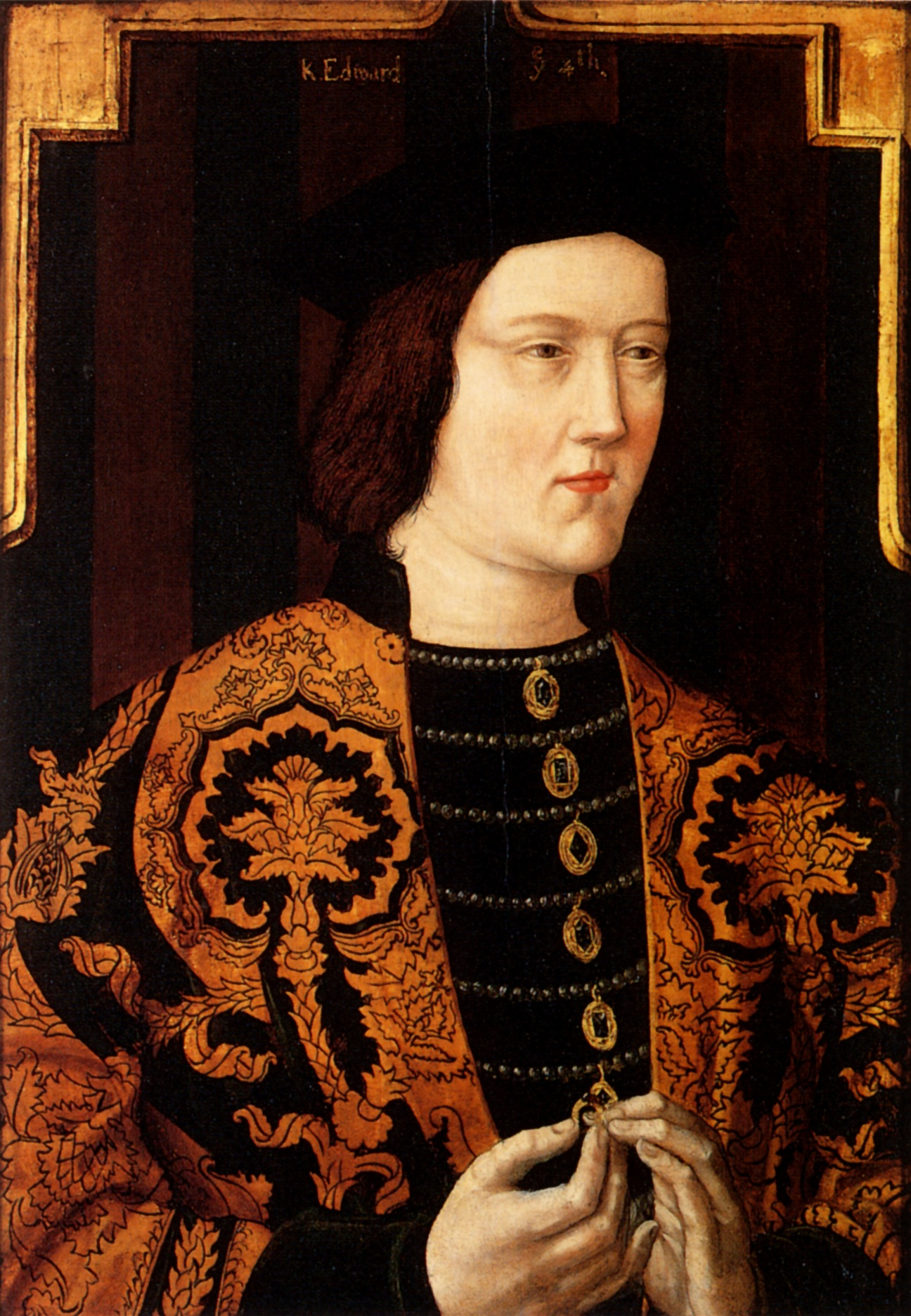
- Portrait, c. 1520, from original made c. 1470–1475

King of England
- 1st reign: 4 March 1461 – 3 October 1470
- 2nd reign: 11 April 1471 – 9 April 1483
- Coronation: 28 June 1461
- Predecessor: Henry VI
- Successor: Edward V
- Born: 28 April 1442; Rouen, Normandy, France
- Died: 9 April 1483 (aged 40); Westminster, England
- Burial: 18 April 1483; St George's Chapel, Windsor Castle
- Spouse: Elizabeth Woodville (m. 1464)
- Issue more...: Elizabeth, Queen of England; Mary of York; Cecily, Viscountess Welles; Edward V, King of England; Margaret of York; Richard, Duke of York; Anne of York, Lady Howard; George, Duke of Bedford; Catherine, Countess of Devon; Bridget of York; Arthur, Viscount Lisle (ill.)
- House: York
- Father: Richard of York, 3rd Duke of York
- Mother: Cecily Neville

Edward IV (28 April 1442 – 9 April 1483) was King of England from 4 March 1461 to 3 October 1470, then again from 11 April 1471 until he died in 1483. A member of the House of York, he was a central figure in the Wars of the Roses, a series of civil wars in England fought between the Yorkist and Lancastrian factions between 1455 and 1487.

Edward inherited the Yorkist claim to the throne at the age of eighteen when his father, Richard, Duke of York, was killed at the Battle of Wakefield in December 1460. After defeating Lancastrian armies at Mortimer's Cross and Towton in early 1461, he deposed King Henry VI and took the throne. His marriage to Elizabeth Woodville in 1464 led to conflict with his chief advisor, Richard Neville, Earl of Warwick, known as the "Kingmaker". In 1470, a revolt led by Warwick and Edward's brother George, Duke of Clarence, briefly re-instated Henry VI. Edward fled to Flanders, where he gathered support and invaded England in March 1471; after victories at the battles of Barnet (where the Earl of Warwick was killed) and Tewkesbury (where Henry VI's son, Edward of Westminster, Prince of Wales, was killed), he resumed the throne. Shortly afterwards, Henry VI was found dead in the Tower of London, possibly killed on Edward's orders.

Despite facing an overseas threat from Henry Tudor, the last remaining Lancastrian claimant, Edward reigned in relative peace for the next twelve years. However, he nearly restarted the Hundred Years' War, following his invasion of France in 1475, but was assuaged by Louis XI in the Treaty of Picquigny. This diplomatic agreement formally ended the Hundred Years' War, which had been in abeyance since 1453. Following his sudden death in April 1483, Edward was briefly succeeded by his son Edward V. He had appointed his younger brother, Richard, Duke of Gloucester, Lord Protector of England for the duration of the new king's minority. However, Edward V and his younger brother Richard, Duke of York, disappeared shortly after and their uncle seized the throne as Richard III.

== Birth and ancestry ==
Edward was born on 28 April 1442 at Rouen in Normandy, eldest surviving son of Richard, 3rd Duke of York, and Cecily Neville. Until his father's death, he was known as the Earl of March. Both his parents were direct descendants of King Edward III, giving Edward a potential claim to the throne. This was strengthened in 1447, when York became heir to the childless King Henry VI on the death of Humphrey, Duke of Gloucester. (Note: Henry's grandfather was Henry IV of England, whose father John of Gaunt was Edward III's third surviving son. Henry IV had deposed Richard II from the senior line. The Duke of York's claim derived from Edward III's fourth son, Edmund, 1st Duke of York, but his mother Anne de Mortimer was the senior descendant of Edward III's second son, Lionel of Antwerp. By modern standards, York was the senior heir, although this was less clear at the time. In practical terms, it meant both he and Edward had a legitimate claim to the throne.)

Allegations of illegitimacy were discounted at the time as politically inspired, and by later historians. (Note: A 2004 television documentary that supported these claims was subsequently discredited.) Edward and his siblings George, Duke of Clarence, and Margaret, Duchess of Burgundy, were physically very similar, all three being tall and blond, in contrast to their father, the Duke of York, who was short and dark. His youngest brother, who later became King Richard III, closely resembled their father. (Note: When Richard III declared his nephews illegitimate in 1483, he did so on the grounds Edward's marriage to their mother was invalid.)

== Early life ==
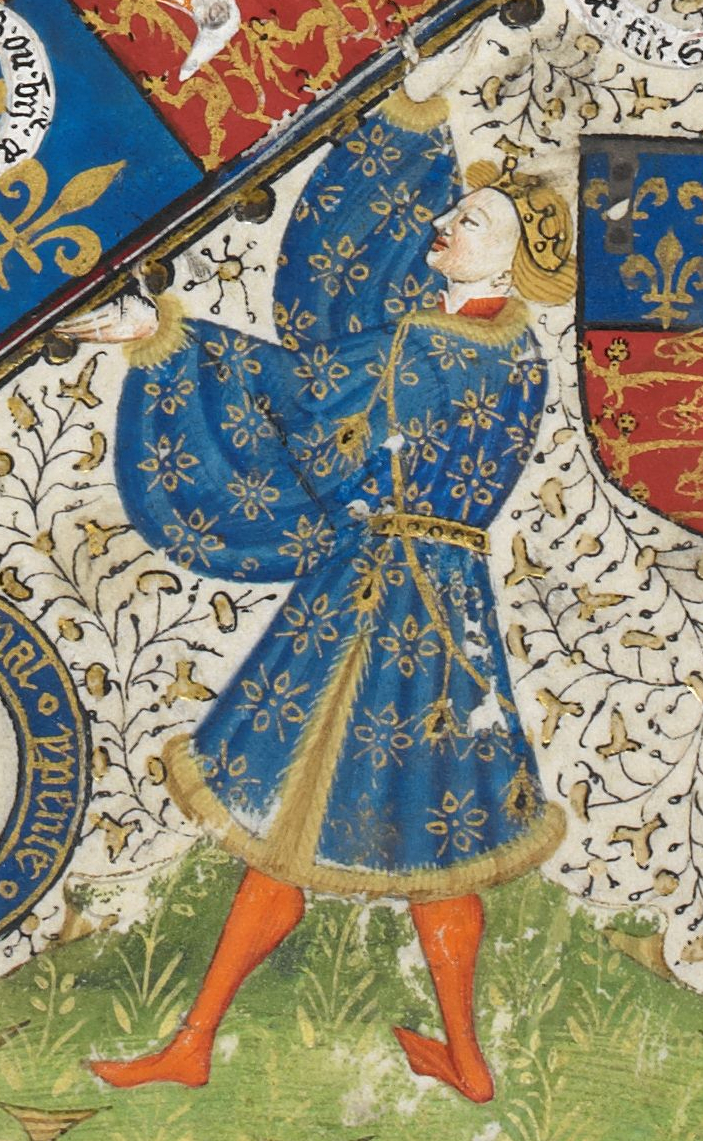
Drawing of Richard of York, 3rd Duke of York, the father of Edward IV and Richard III, c. 1445

During Edward's youth, there was economic decline in England and military defeat abroad, exacerbated by a weak and corrupt central government. Both Edward and his younger brother Edmund, Earl of Rutland, were born in Rouen, where their father, the Duke of York, served as governor of English lands in France until 1445, when he was replaced by Henry Beaufort, 3rd Duke of Somerset. Edward and Edmund were probably brought up at Ludlow Castle, in the Welsh Marches, where the Duke of York was the dominant landowner.

In 1447, the Duke of York was made chief governor of Ireland, although he did not take up the post until 1449. Most of Normandy was recaptured by the French, leaving Calais as the last English possession in Northern France; Somerset, whom many held responsible for the losses, was appointed King Henry's chief minister. English politics became dominated by the struggle between the Yorkists and supporters of the House of Lancaster, or Lancastrians, notably the Duke of Somerset, William de la Pole, 1st Duke of Suffolk, and King Henry VI's wife, Margaret of Anjou.

Matters came to a head in August 1453 when King Henry VI collapsed into a catatonic stupor on hearing news of the loss of Gascony, an English possession for over 300 years. The Duke of York took over the government, his chief supporters being Richard Neville, 5th Earl of Salisbury, and Salisbury's eldest son, Richard Neville, 16th Earl of Warwick. In January 1454, 12-year-old Edward accompanied his father to London to attend the Great Council.

The birth of King Henry VI's son, Edward of Westminster, Prince of Wales, in October 1453 created a viable Lancastrian figurehead, and the 1450s was dominated by political conflict between the two factions. By the age of 17, the Earl of March was a political and military leader in his own right; after their defeat at the Battle of Ludford Bridge in 1459, his father and brother Edmund fled to Ireland, while the Earls of March, Salisbury and Warwick made their way to Calais. Edward's name appears alongside those of his father, Warwick and Salisbury in widely circulated manifestoes declaring their quarrel was only with Henry's evil counsellors.

In 1460, Edward crossed the English Channel with Warwick and Salisbury, and marched into London. At Northampton in July, he commanded one of three divisions in a Yorkist victory that led to the capture of Henry VI. York returned from Ireland; on entering the Palace of Westminster, he declared himself king, a claim greeted by the assembled lords in silence. The Act of Accord agreed to a compromise, whereby Henry remained king, but York and his descendants were designated his successors.

The implications of removing the legally accepted heir to the throne created substantial opposition to the Yorkist administration; in late 1460, Edward was given his first independent command and sent to deal with a Lancastrian insurgency in Wales. Warwick remained in London, while York, Salisbury, and Edmund marched north to suppress another in Yorkshire; all three were killed following defeat at Wakefield on 30 December, leaving Edward as the new head of the Yorkist party.

== Reign ==
=== Accession to the throne ===
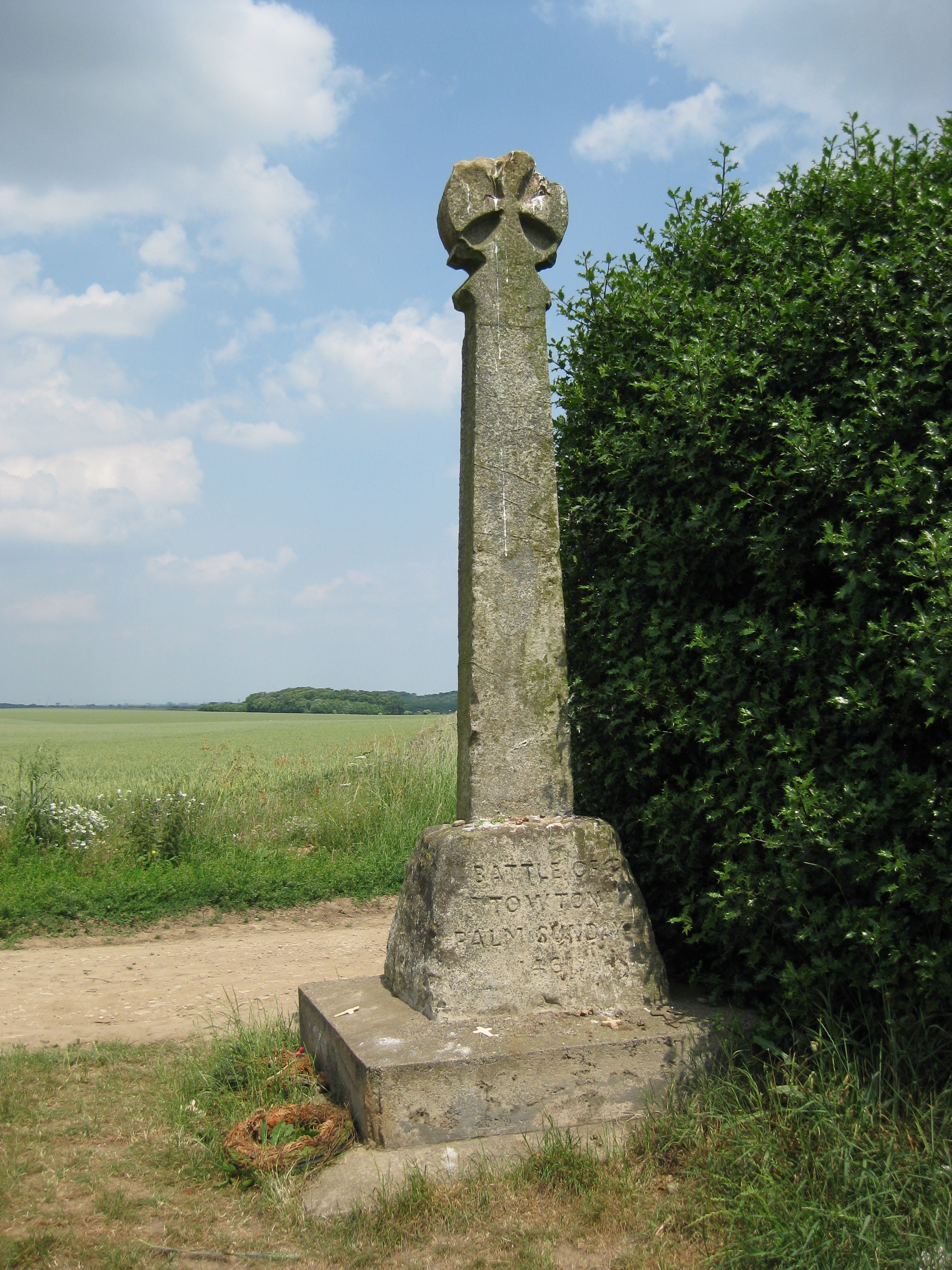
Towton Cross, commemorating Edward's victory at the Battle of Towton

At this stage of Edward's career, contemporaries like Philippe de Commines described him as handsome, affable, and energetic. Unusually tall for the period at 6 feet 4 inches (193 centimetres), he was an impressive sight in armour, and took care to wear splendid clothes. This was done deliberately to contrast him with King Henry VI, whose physical and mental frailties undermined his position.

On 2 February 1461, (Note: Now the generally accepted date, although others suggest it was fought on 3 February) Edward won a hard-fought victory at the Battle of Mortimer's Cross in Herefordshire. The battle was preceded by a meteorological phenomenon known as parhelion, or three suns, which he took as his emblem, the "Sun in splendour". However, this was offset by Warwick's defeat at the Second Battle of St Albans on 17 February, the Lancastrians regaining custody of Henry VI. The two met in London, where Edward was hastily appointed king, before marching north, where the two sides met at the Battle of Towton. Fought on 29 March in the middle of a snowstorm, it was the bloodiest battle ever to take place on English soil, and ended in a decisive Yorkist victory.

Estimates of the dead range from 9,000 to 20,000; figures are uncertain, as most of the mass graves were emptied or moved over the centuries, while corpses were generally stripped of clothing or armour before burial. Nevertheless, casualties among the Lancastrian nobility were enormous and explain the enduring bitterness among those who survived. Since 1996, excavations have uncovered over 50 skeletons from the battle; an analysis of their injuries shows the brutality of the contest, including extensive post-mortem mutilations.

Margaret fled to Scotland with Edward of Westminster, while the new king returned to London for his 28 June 1461 coronation. Henry VI remained at large for over a year, but was caught and imprisoned in the Tower of London. There was little point in killing him while his son remained alive since this would have transferred the Lancastrian claim from a frail captive to one who was young and free.

=== 1461 to 1470 ===
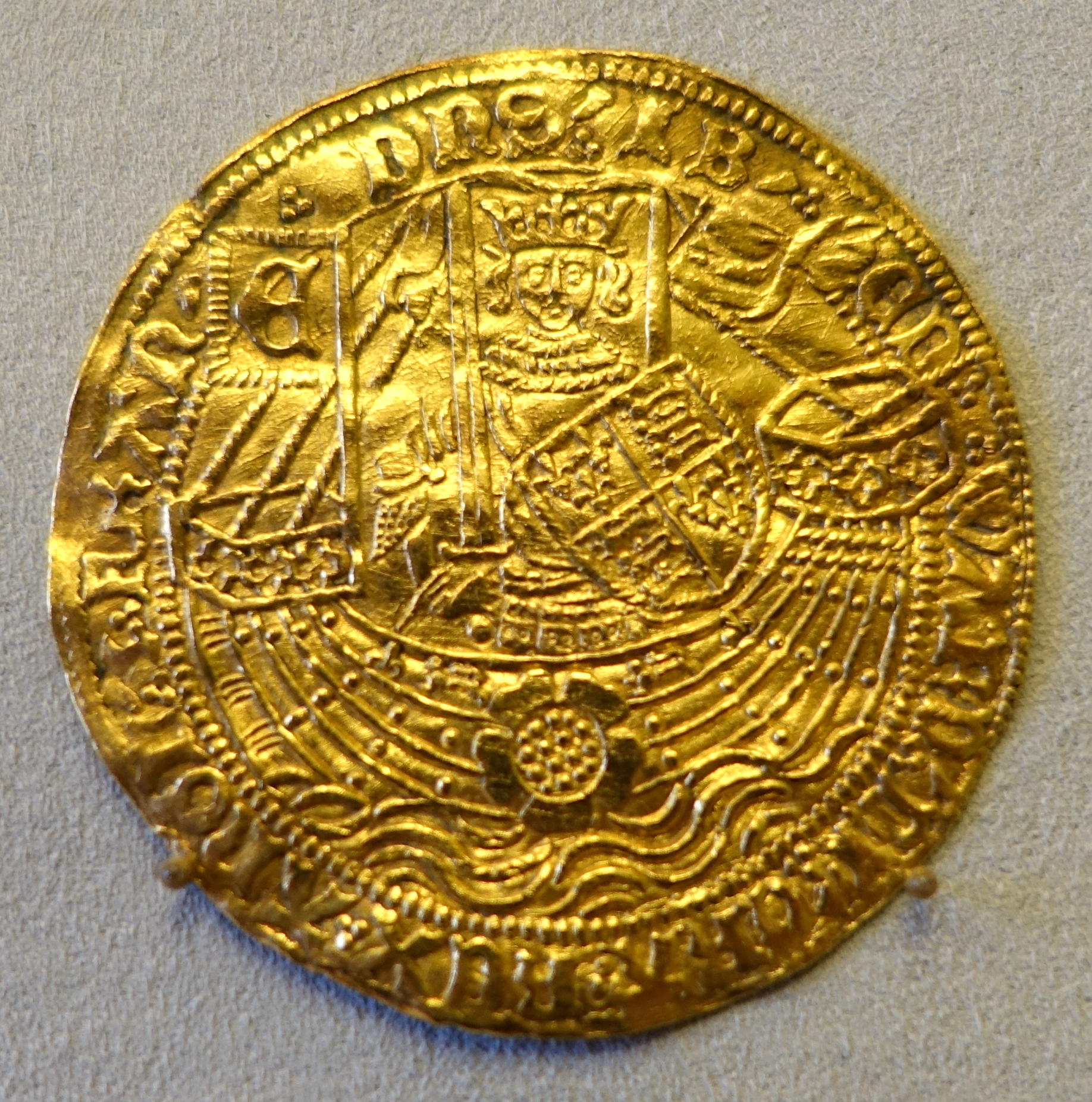
Rose Noble coin of Edward IV, minted in 1464

Most of the nobility had either remained loyal to Henry or stayed neutral, forcing Edward to rely heavily on the Nevilles. Consolidating the regime initially took precedence, but John Neville's victory at the 1464 Battle of Hexham seemed to end the Lancastrian threat. This exposed internal divisions, particularly over foreign policy, which in this period largely focused on the relationship between England, France and the Duchy of Burgundy, with two of the parties manoeuvring to form an alliance against the third. Although Edward preferred Burgundy as a partner, he allowed Warwick to negotiate a treaty with Louis XI of France, which included a suggested marriage between Edward and Anne of France or Bona of Savoy, respectively daughter and sister-in-law of the French king.

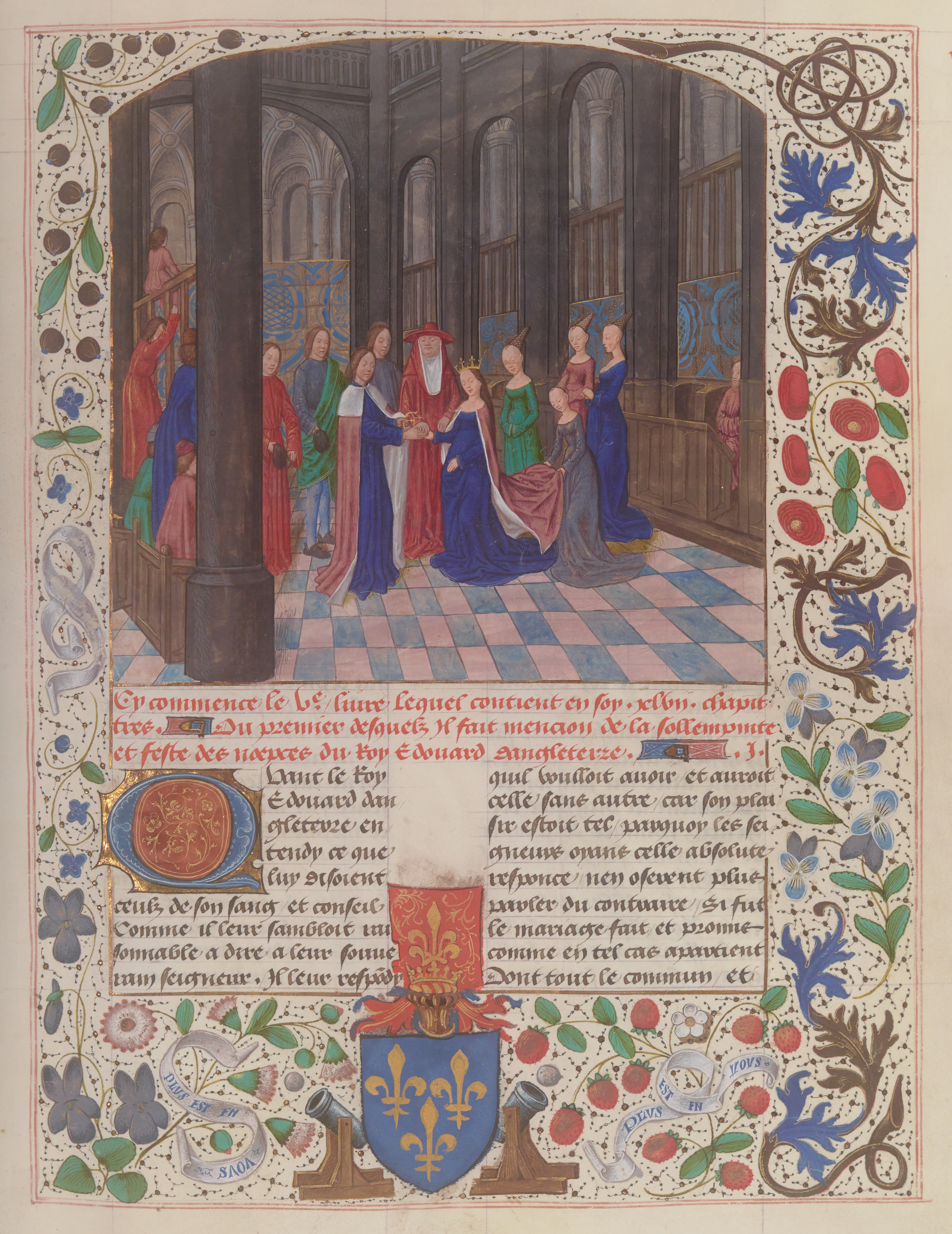
The marriage of Edward IV to Elizabeth Woodville, from the illuminated manuscript Anciennes Chroniques d'Angleterre, by Jean de Wavrin

In October 1464, Warwick was enraged to discover that on 1 May, Edward had secretly married Elizabeth Woodville, a widow with two sons, whose Lancastrian husband, John Grey of Groby, died at the Second Battle of St Albans. If nothing else, it was a clear demonstration he was not in control of the king, despite suggestions to the contrary. Edward's motives have been widely discussed by contemporaries and historians. Although Elizabeth's mother, Jacquetta of Luxembourg, came from the upper nobility, her father, Richard Woodville, Lord Rivers, was a middle-ranking provincial baron. The Privy Council told Edward with unusual frankness that "she was no wife for a prince such as himself, for she was not the daughter of a duke or earl."

The marriage was certainly unwise and unusual, although not unheard of; Henry VI's mother, Catherine of Valois, married her chamberlain, Owen Tudor. By all accounts, Elizabeth possessed considerable charm of person and intellect, while Edward was used to getting what he wanted. Historians generally accept the marriage was an impulsive decision, but differ on whether it was also a "calculated political move". One view is the low status of the Woodvilles was part of the attraction, since unlike the Nevilles, they were reliant on Edward and thus more likely to remain loyal. Others argue if this was his purpose, there were far better options available; all agree it had significant political implications that impacted the rest of Edward's reign.

One reason for this was that twelve of the new queen's siblings survived into adulthood, creating a large pool of competitors for offices and estates, as well as in the matrimony market. Resentment built when her sisters made a series of advantageous unions, including that of Catherine Woodville to Henry Stafford, 2nd Duke of Buckingham; Anne Woodville to William, heir to Henry Bourchier, 1st Earl of Essex; and Eleanor Woodville with Anthony, heir to Edmund Grey, 1st Earl of Kent.

In 1467, Edward dismissed his Lord Chancellor, Warwick's brother George Neville, Archbishop of York. Warwick responded by building an alliance with Edward's disaffected younger brother and heir, the Duke of Clarence, who held estates adjacent to the Neville heartland in the north. Concerned by this, Edward blocked a proposed marriage between Clarence and Warwick's eldest daughter Isabel. In early July 1469, Clarence defied his brother by travelling to Calais, where he married Isabel in a ceremony conducted by George Neville and overseen by Warwick. The three men issued a 'remonstrance', listing alleged abuses by the Woodvilles and other advisors close to Edward and then returned to London, where they assembled an army to remove these 'evil councillors' and establish good government.

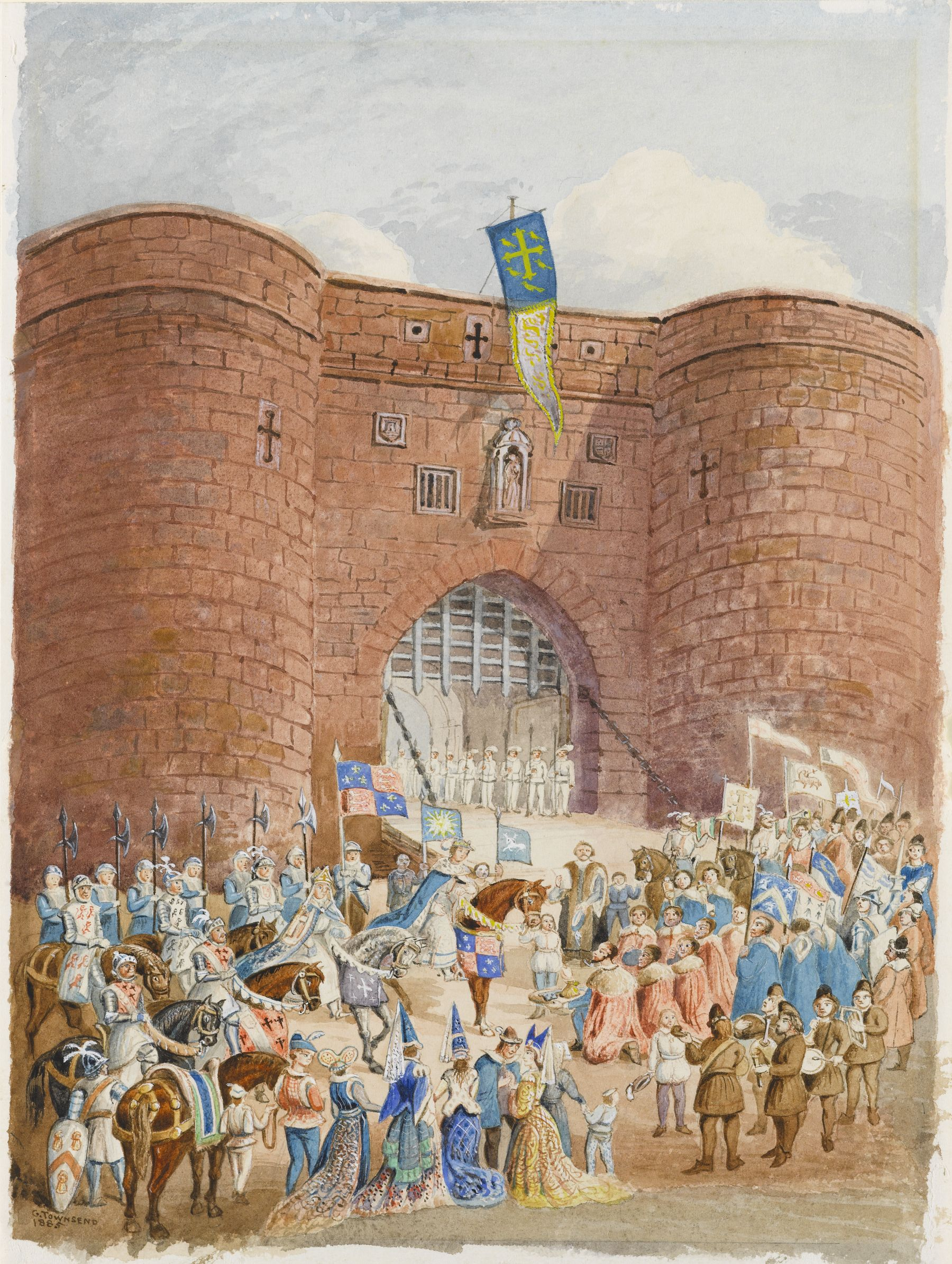
Watercolour by George Townsend, 1885, of King Edward IV's reception to Exeter in 1470

With Edward still in the north, the royal army was defeated by a Neville force at Edgecote Moor on 24 July 1469. After the battle, Edward was held in Middleham Castle; on 12 August, his father-in-law Richard Woodville and Richard's younger son, John Woodville, were executed at Kenilworth. It soon became clear there was little support for Warwick or Clarence; Edward was released in September and resumed the throne. Outwardly, the situation remained unchanged, but tensions persisted and Edward did nothing to reduce the Nevilles' sense of vulnerability. The Percys, traditional rivals of the Neville family in the North, fought for Lancaster at Towton; their titles and estates were confiscated and given to Warwick's brother John Neville. In early 1470, Edward reinstated Henry Percy as Earl of Northumberland; John was compensated with the title Marquess of Montagu, but this was a significant demotion for a key supporter.

In March 1470, Warwick and Clarence exploited a private feud to start the 1470 Lincolnshire Rebellion; when it was defeated, the two fled to France in May 1470. Seeing an opportunity, Louis XI persuaded Warwick to negotiate with his enemy, Margaret of Anjou; she eventually agreed, first making him kneel before her in silence for fifteen minutes. With French support, Warwick landed in England on 9 September 1470 and announced his intention to restore Henry. By now, the Yorkist regime was deeply unpopular and the Lancastrians rapidly assembled an army of over 30,000; when John Neville switched sides, Edward narrowly escaped capture and was forced to seek refuge in Bruges.

=== Exile and restoration ===
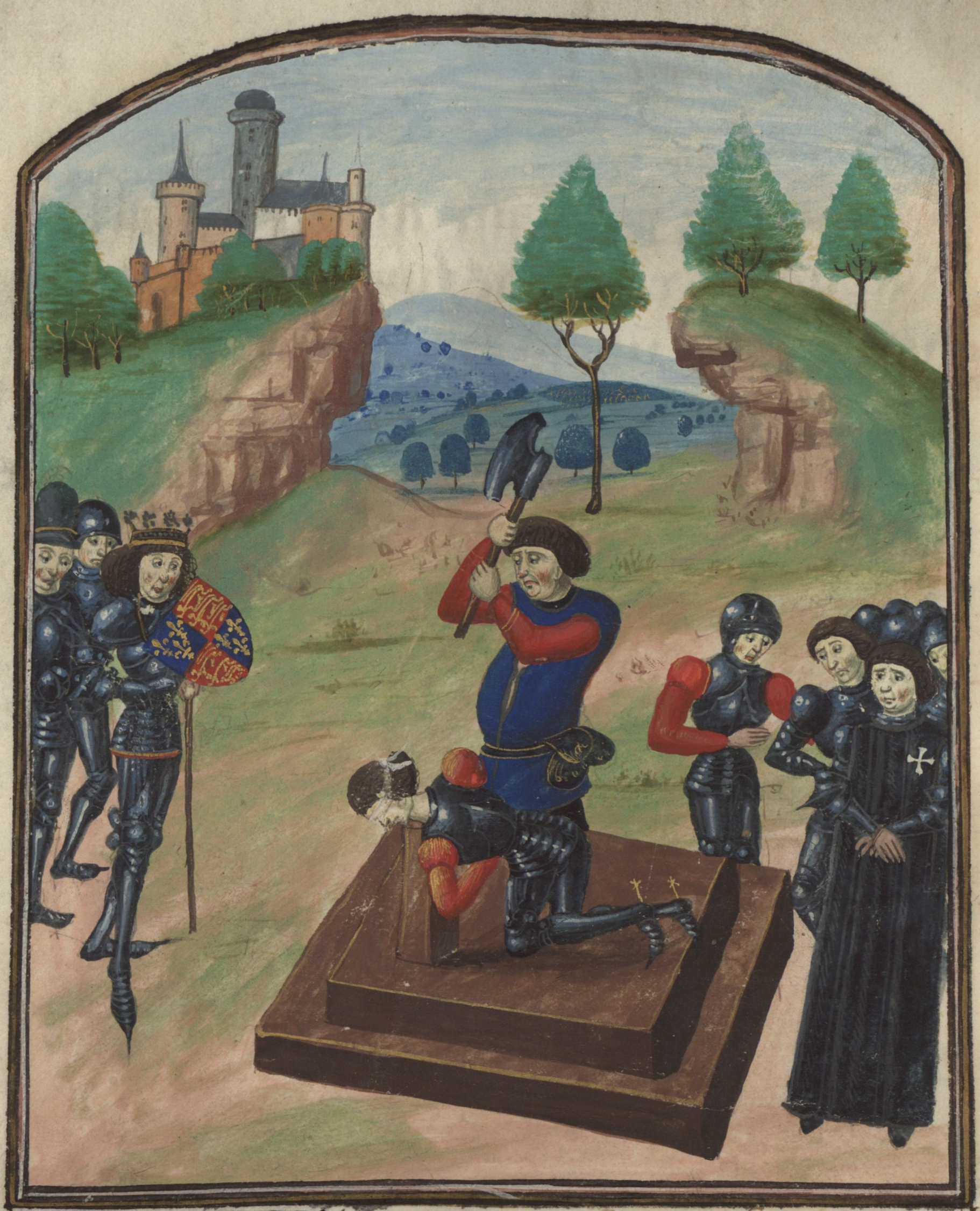
Edward IV (left) watching the execution of Edmund Beaufort, 4th Duke of Somerset, at Tewkesbury, 1471

Edward took refuge in Flanders, part of the Duchy of Burgundy, accompanied by a few hundred men, including his younger brother Richard, Duke of Gloucester, Anthony Woodville and William Hastings. The Duchy was ruled by Charles the Bold, husband of his sister Margaret; he provided minimal help, something Edward never forgot. The restored Lancastrian regime faced the same issue that dominated Henry's previous reign. Mental and physical frailties made him incapable of ruling and resulted in an internal struggle for control, made worse because the coalition that put him back on the throne consisted of bitter enemies. Edmund Beaufort, 4th Duke of Somerset, held Warwick responsible for his father's death in 1455 and for his elder brother's death in 1464; Warwick and Clarence quickly found themselves isolated by the new regime.

Backed by wealthy Flemish merchants, in March 1471 Edward landed near Hull, close to his estates in Yorkshire. Supporters were reluctant to join him; the important northern city of York opened its gates only when he claimed to be seeking the return of his dukedom, like Henry IV seventy years earlier. The first significant contingent to join was a group of 600 men under William Parr and James Harrington. Parr fought against the Yorkists at Edgecote in 1469 and his defection confirmed Clarence's decision to switch sides; as they marched south, more recruits came in, including 3,000 at Leicester.

Edward entered London unopposed and took Henry prisoner; Warwick was defeated and killed at the Battle of Barnet on 14 April, while a second Lancastrian army was destroyed at the Battle of Tewkesbury on 4 May. Sixteen-year-old Edward of Westminster, the heir to the throne, died on the battlefield, with surviving leaders like Somerset executed shortly afterwards. This was followed by Henry's death a few days later; a contemporary chronicle claimed this was due to "melancholy" but it is generally assumed he was killed on Edward's orders.

Although the Lancastrian cause seemed at an end, the regime was destabilised by a quarrel between Clarence and his brother Gloucester. The two were married to Isabel Neville and Anne Neville, respectively, the daughters of the Earl and Countess of Warwick and heirs to their mother's considerable inheritance. Many of the estates held by the brothers had been granted by Edward, who could also remove them, making them dependent on his favour. This was not the case with property acquired through marriage and explains the importance of this dispute.

=== 1471 to 1483 ===
The last significant rebellion ended in February 1474 with the surrender of John de Vere, 13th Earl of Oxford, who survived to command the Lancastrian army at Bosworth in 1485. Clarence was widely suspected of involvement, a factor in his eventual execution in the Tower on 18 February 1478; claims he was "drowned in a butt of Malmsey wine" appears to have been a joke by Edward, referring to his favourite drink.

In 1475, Edward allied with Burgundy and declared war on France. With Duke Charles busy with the Siege of Neuss, Louis opened negotiations. Soon after Edward landed at Calais, the two signed the Treaty of Picquigny. Edward received an immediate payment of 75,000 crowns, plus a yearly pension of 50,000 crowns, thus allowing him to recoup the costs of his army. In 1482, Edward backed an attempt to usurp the Scottish throne by Alexander Stewart, 1st Duke of Albany, brother of James III of Scotland. Gloucester invaded Scotland and took the town of Edinburgh, but not Edinburgh Castle, where James was being held prisoner by his nobles. Albany switched sides and without siege equipment, the English army was forced to withdraw, with little to show for an expensive campaign, apart from the capture of Berwick Castle.

=== Illness and death ===
Edward's health began to fail, and he became subject to an increasing number of ailments; his physicians attributed this in part to a habitual use of emetics, which allowed him to gorge himself at meals, then return after vomiting to start again. He fell fatally ill at Easter 1483, but survived long enough to add codicils to his will, the most important naming his brother as Protector after his death. He died on 9 April 1483 and was buried in St George's Chapel, Windsor Castle. His twelve-year-old son, Edward V, was never crowned, Gloucester becoming King Richard III in July.

The cause of Edward's death is uncertain; allegations of poison were common in an era when lack of medical knowledge meant death often had no obvious explanation. Other suggestions include pneumonia or malaria, although both were well-known and easy to describe. One contemporary attributed it to apoplexy brought on by excess, which fits with what is known of his physical habits. Another theory is that Edward died of syphilis.

While the War of the Roses has been documented by numerous historians, Edward as an individual is less well known; 19th century historians like William Stubbs generally dismissed him as a bloodthirsty nonentity. The most comprehensive modern biography was written by Charles Ross in 1974, who concluded the peace and stability of his later reign was squandered in short-term aggrandisement. He further suggests that Edward "remains the only king in English history since 1066 in active possession of his throne who failed to secure the safe succession of his son. His lack of political foresight is largely to blame for the unhappy aftermath of his early death."

== Political ==
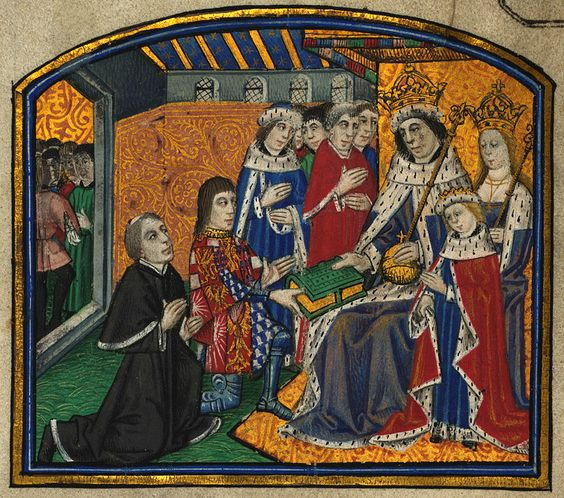
Presentation miniature from Dictes and Sayings of the Philosophers, printed in England by William Caxton in 1477. Edward is shown receiving a manuscript copy from Woodville, accompanied by his wife Elizabeth, his eldest son Edward, and his brother Richard.

Commentators observe a marked difference between Edward's first period as king, and the second. The failure of attempts to reconcile former enemies like Somerset meant he was noticeably more ruthless after 1471, including the execution of his brother Clarence. In his youth, Edward was a capable and charismatic military commander, who led from the front, but as he grew older, the energy noted by contemporaries became less apparent.

One effect of this was that Parliament became increasingly reluctant to approve taxes for wars which Edward failed to prosecute, then used the funds instead to finance his household expenditures. Under his rule, ownership of the Duchy of Lancaster was transferred to the Crown, where it remains today. In 1478, his staff prepared the so-called 'Black Book', a comprehensive review of government finances, still in use a century later. He invested heavily in business ventures with the City of London, which he used as an additional source of funding.

Although the economy recovered from the depression of 1450 to 1470, Edward's spending habitually exceeded income; on his death in 1483, the Crown had less than £1,200 in cash. His close relationship with the London branch of the Medici Bank ended in its bankruptcy; in 1517, the Medicis were still seeking repayment of Edward's debts.

Economics was closely linked to foreign policy; Edward's reign was dominated by the three-sided diplomatic contest between England, France, and Burgundy, with two of the three seeking to ally against the third. (Note: This resurfaced in the 17th century contest between England, the Dutch Republic, and France under Louis XIV.) As Flemish merchants were the largest buyers of English wool, Edward was generally pro-Burgundian, although Duke Charles' reluctance to support him in 1471 cooled their relationship. The death of Charles in 1477 led to the 1482 Treaty of Arras; Flanders, along with the lands known as the Burgundian Netherlands, became part of the Holy Roman Empire and France acquired the rest. Edward and his successors lost much of their influence.

=== Cultural ===
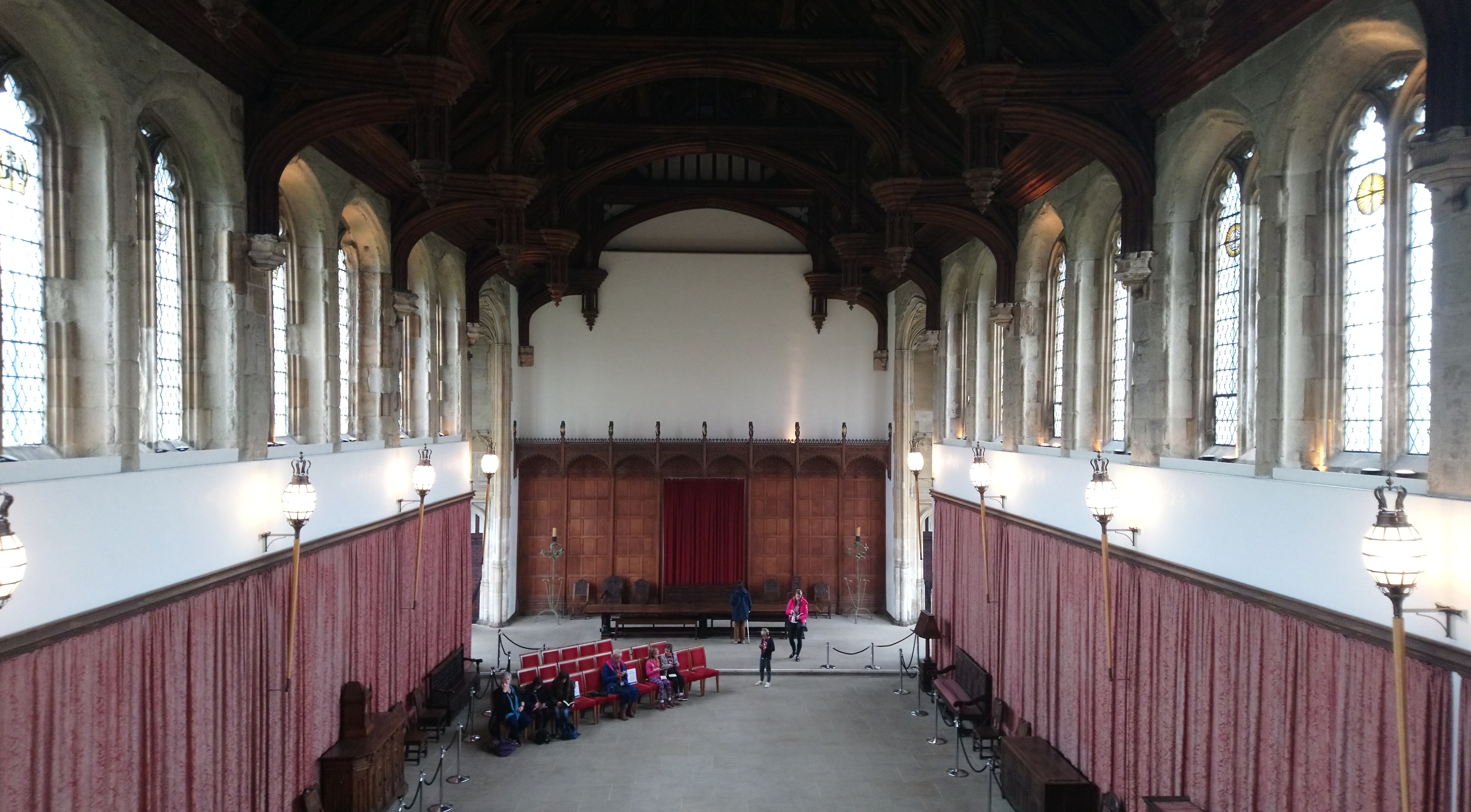
Edward's Great Hall at Eltham Palace in southeast London, 2018

Edward's court was described by a visitor from Europe as "the most splendid ... in all Christendom". He spent large amounts on expensive status symbols to show off his power and wealth as king of England, while his collecting habits show an eye for style and an interest in scholarship, particularly history. He acquired fine clothes, jewels, and furnishings, as well as a collection of beautifully illuminated historical and literary manuscripts, many made specially for him by craftsmen in Bruges. His book purchases included books for entertainment and instruction, whose contents reveal his interests. They focus on the lives of great rulers, including Julius Caesar, historical chronicles, and instructional and religious works. In 1476, William Caxton established the first English printing press in the outbuildings of Westminster Abbey; on 18 November 1477, he produced Sayengis of the Philosophres, translated into English for Edward by his brother-in-law Anthony Woodville.

It is not known where or how Edward's library was stored, but it is recorded that he transferred volumes from the Great Wardrobe to Eltham Palace and that he had a yeoman "to kepe the king's bookes". More than forty of his books survive intact from the 15th century, which suggests they were carefully stored, and are in the Royal Collection of manuscripts, held by the British Library. Edward spent large sums on Eltham Palace, including the extant Great Hall, the site of a feast for 2,000 people in December 1482, shortly before his death in April. He also began great improvements to St George's Chapel, Windsor, where he was buried in 1483; later completed by Henry VII, it was badly damaged during the First English Civil War, and little of the original work remains.

== Marriage and children ==
Edward had ten children by Elizabeth Woodville, seven of whom survived him; they were declared illegitimate under the 1484 Titulus Regius, an act repealed by Henry VII, who married Edward's eldest daughter, Elizabeth.

- Elizabeth of York (11 February 1466 – 11 February 1503), Queen consort of England; married Henry VII of England, mother of King Henry VIII.
- Mary of York (11 August 1467 – 23 May 1482).
- Cecily of York (20 March 1469 – 24 August 1507), Viscountess Welles; married John Welles, 1st Viscount Welles, then Thomas Kyme or Keme.
- Edward V of England (2 November 1470 – c. 1483); one of the Princes in the Tower; disappeared, assumed murdered prior to his coronation, c. 1483.
- Margaret of York (10 April 1472 – 11 December 1472).
- Richard, Duke of York (17 August 1473 – c. 1483); one of the Princes in the Tower; disappeared, assumed murdered c. 1483.
- Anne of York (2 November 1475 – 23 November 1511), Lady Howard; married Thomas Howard (later 3rd Duke of Norfolk).
- George, Duke of Bedford (March 1477 – March 1479).
- Catherine of York (14 August 1479 – 15 November 1527), Countess of Devon; married William Courtenay, 1st Earl of Devon.
- Bridget of York (10 November 1480 – 1507), nun at Dartford Priory, Kent.

Edward had numerous mistresses, including Lady Eleanor Talbot and Elizabeth Lucy, possibly daughter of Thomas Waite (or Wayte), of Southampton. The most famous was Jane Shore, later compelled by Richard III to perform public penance at Paul's Cross; Thomas More claimed this backfired, since "albeit she were out of al array save her kyrtle only: yet went she so fair & lovely ... that her great shame wan her much praise."

Edward had several acknowledged illegitimate children;

- Elizabeth Plantagenet (born c. 1464), possibly daughter of Elizabeth Lucy, who married Thomas, son of George Lumley, Baron Lumley.
- Arthur Plantagenet, 1st Viscount Lisle (1460s/1470s – 3 March 1542), author of the Lisle Papers, an important historical source for the Tudor period. From his first marriage to Elizabeth Grey, he had three daughters, Frances, Elizabeth and Bridget Plantagenet.
- Grace Plantagenet, recorded as attending the funeral of Elizabeth Woodville in 1492.

There are claims for many others, including Mary, second wife of Henry Harman of Ellam, and Isabel Mylbery (born circa 1470), who married John Tuchet, son of John Tuchet, 6th Baron Audley. However, the evidence for these is circumstantial.

== Aftermath ==
Edward IV's eldest son, also named Edward, was made Prince of Wales when he was seven months old and given his own household at the age of three. Based in Ludlow Castle, he was supervised by his uncle, Anthony Woodville, 2nd Earl Rivers, who also acted as his regent for the Council of Wales and the Marches. The historical consensus is he and his brother Richard were killed, probably between July and September 1483; debate on who gave the orders, and why, continues, although their uncle Richard III was the beneficiary.

By mid-August, Elizabeth Woodville was certain of the deaths of her sons; after her initial grief turned to fury, she opened secret talks with Margaret Beaufort. She promised her support in return for Henry's agreement to marry her eldest daughter Elizabeth. In December 1483, Henry swore an oath to do so, which he duly carried out after his coronation in October 1485.

Prior to his succession, Richard III declared his nephews illegitimate, on the grounds his brother's marriage to Elizabeth Woodville was invalid. The Titulus Regius argued that the alleged pre-contract of marriage between Edward IV and Lady Eleanor Talbot rendered his marriage to Elizabeth Woodville void. Both Eleanor and Edward were dead, but according to Philippe de Commines, Robert Stillington, Bishop of Bath and Wells, claimed to have carried out the ceremony himself. Once secure on the throne, Henry VII annulled Titulus Regius and arrested Stillington, who died in prison in 1491.

Despite this apparent resolution, the Yorkist cause continued well into the 16th century. The most famous Yorkist claimants were the pretenders Lambert Simnel and Perkin Warbeck, but other claimants remained a concern for Henry VII and his son.

== Heraldry ==
Coats of arms of Edward IV of England

As Duke of York, Edward bore the royal arms quartered with those of de Burgh and Mortimer.

As King he bore the royal arms undifferenced. Examples exist of several varying combinations of crest, supporters and motto.

White rose of York

== Genealogical table ==
Edward IV's position in relation to the houses of York and Lancaster (selective chart)

Edward III	Philippa of Hainault
Edward, Prince of Wales	Lionel, Duke of Clarence	John, Duke of Lancaster	Edmund, Duke of York
Richard II	Philippa, Countess of Ulster
Henry IV	Joan Beaufort
Roger Mortimer, 4th Earl of March
Henry V
Anne Mortimer	Richard, Earl of Cambridge
Margaret of Anjou	Henry VI	Richard Neville, 5th Earl of Salisbury	Richard, Duke of York	Cecily Neville
Edward, Prince of Wales	Richard Neville, 16th Earl of Warwick	Edward IV	George, Duke of Clarence	Richard III

== See also ==
- List of earls in the reigns of Henry VI and Edward IV of England

== Sources ==
=== Works cited ===
- Ashdown-Hill, John (2016). The Private Life of Edward IV. Amberley. ISBN 978-1-4456-5245-0.
- Ashley, Mike (2002). British Kings & Queens. Carroll & Graf. ISBN 0-7867-1104-3. OL 8141172M.
- Backhouse, Janet (1987). "Founders of the Royal Library: Edward IV and Henry VII as Collectors of Illuminated Manuscripts". In Williams, David (ed.). England in the Fifteenth Century: Proceedings of the 1986 Harlaxton Symposium. Boydell Press. ISBN 978-0-8511-5475-6.
- Burke, John (1836). A Genealogical and Heraldic History of the Commoners of Great Britain and Ireland Enjoying Territorial Possessions Or High Official Rank: But Uninvested with Heritable Honours. Vol. II. Henry Colburn.
- Carpenter, Christine (1997). The Wars of the Roses: Politics and the Constitution in England, c. 1437–1509. Cambridge University Press. ISBN 978-0-5213-1874-7.
- Carson, Annette (2009). Richard III: The Maligned King. History Press. ISBN 978-0-7524-5208-1.
- Chibnall, Marjorie (1960). "Review; The Household of Edward IV: The Black Book and the Ordinance of 1478, by A. R. Myers". The Journal of Economic History. 20 (2).
- Corbet, Anthony, Dr (2015). Edward IV, England's Forgotten Warrior King: His Life, His People, and His Legacy. iUniverse. ISBN 978-1-4917-4635-6.
- Crawford, Anne (2008). The Yorkists: The History of a Dynasty. A&C Black. ISBN 978-1-8472-5197-8.
- Doyle, Kathleen (2011). McKendrick, Scot; Lowden, John; Doyle, Kathleen (eds.). The Old Royal Library. Royal Manuscripts: The Genius of Illumination. British Library. ISBN 978-0-7123-5816-3.
- Gillingham, John (2001) [1982]. The Wars of the Roses. Weidenfeld & Nicolson. ISBN 978-0-2978-2016-1. OL 3532002M.
- Given-Wilson, Chris; Curteis, Alice (1984). The Royal Bastards of Medieval England. Routledge & Kegan Paul. ISBN 978-0-7102-0025-9.
- Gravett, Christopher (2003). Towton 1461: England's Bloodiest Battle. Osprey Publishing. ISBN 978-1-8417-6513-6.
- Harris, Nicholas (1830). Privy Purse expenses of Elizabeth of York: Wardrobe Accounts of Edward IV. London: William Pickering.
- Hicks, Michael (2011). Richard III. History Press. ISBN 978-0-7524-7326-0.
- Horrox, Rosemary (1989). Richard III: A Study of Service. Cambridge University Press. ISBN 978-0-5214-0726-7.
  —— (2004). "Shore [née Lambert], Elizabeth [Jane]". Oxford Dictionary of National Biography (online ed.). Oxford DNB. doi:10.1093/ref:odnb/25451. (Subscription, Wikipedia Library access or UK public library membership required.)
- Kendall, Paul Murray (1970). Louis XI, the Universal Spider. Norton.
- Kerling, Nelly Johanna (1954). Commercial Relations of Holland and Zeeland with England from the Late 13th century to the Close of the Middle Ages. University of Leiden–Brill.
- Kleiman, Irit Ruth (2013). Philippe de Commynes: Memory, Betrayal, Text. University of Toronto Press. ISBN 978-1-4426-6324-4.
- Mackenzie, Eneas (1825). An Historical, Topographical, and Descriptive View of the County of Northumberland... Mackenzie and Dent.
- McKendrick, Scot (2011). McKendrick, Scot; Lowden, John; Doyle, Kathleen (eds.). A European Heritage, Books of Continental Origin. Royal Manuscripts: The Genius of Illumination. British Library. ISBN 978-0-7123-5816-3.
- Panton, James (2011). Historical Dictionary of the British Monarchy. Scarecrow Press. ISBN 978-0-8108-5779-7.
- Parry, Edward (1851). Royal visits and progresses to Wales, and the border counties.
- Penn, Thomas (2019). The Brothers York. Allen Lane. ISBN 978-1-8461-4690-9.
- Rorke, Martin (2006). "English and Scottish Overseas Trade, 1300–1600". The Economic History Review. 59 (2): 265–288. doi:10.1111/j.1468-0289.2006.00346.x. JSTOR 3805936. S2CID 153762480.
- Ross, Charles (1974). Edward IV. University of California Press. ISBN 978-0-5200-2781-7.
  —— (1981). Richard III. Eyre Methuen. ISBN 978-0-4132-9530-9.
- Seward, Desmond (1997). Wars of the Roses. Constable. ISBN 978-0-0947-7300-4.
- Sutherland, T. L.; Schmidt, A. (2003). "The Towton Battlefield Archaeological Survey Project: An Integrated Approach to Battlefield Archaeology". Landscapes. 4 (2). JSTOR 3805936.
- Thurley, Simon (1993). The Royal Palaces of Tudor England: A Social and Architectural History. Yale University Press. ISBN 978-0-3000-5420-0.
- Timbs, John (1855). Curiosities of London: Exhibiting the Most Rare and Remarkable Objects of Interest in the Metropolis. D. Bogue.
- Whittle, Andrew (2017). The Historical Reputation of Edward IV 1461–1725 (PDF). University of East Anglia, School of History PHD. Archived (PDF) from the original on 17 December 2019.
- Wilkinson, Bertie (1964). Constitutional History of England in the Fifteenth Century (1399–1485): With Illustrative Documents. Longmans.
- Williams, Neville (1973). The Life and Times of Henry VII. London: Weidenfeld and Nicolson. ISBN 978-0-2977-6517-2.
- Wilson, Trish (27 July 2014). "Was Edward IV Illegitimate?: The Case for the Defence". History Files.
- Wolfe, Bertram (1981). Henry VI (The English Monarchs Series). Methuen. ISBN 978-0-4133-2080-3.

Edward IV House of York Cadet branch of the House of Plantagenet Born: 28 April 1442 Died: 9 April 1483
Regnal titles
Preceded by Henry VI	King of England; Lord of Ireland; 1461–1470	Succeeded by Henry VI
Preceded by Henry VI	King of England; Lord of Ireland; 1471–1483	Succeeded by Edward V
Peerage of England
Preceded by Richard Plantagenet	Duke of York; Earl of Cambridge; Earl of March; 1460–1461	Merged in Crown
Peerage of Ireland
Preceded by Richard Plantagenet	Earl of Ulster; 1460–1461	Merged in Crown
