= 1518 in France =

- Decades: 1490s; 1500s; 1510s; 1520s; 1530s
- See also: History of France; Timeline of French history; List of years in France

Events from the year 1518 in France.

== Incumbents ==
- Monarch – Francis I

== Events ==
- February 2 – Jean Sauvage, Chancellor of Burgundy is appointed Chief Judge of the Cortes of Valladolid.
- October 3 – Treaty of London: a non-aggression pact between the major European states.

== Births ==
- February 28 – Duke Francis III of Brittany (d. 1536)
- April 22 – Antoine de Bourbon, father of Henry IV of France (d. 1562)

=== Date unknown ===
- Hubert Languet, French diplomat and reformer (d. 1581)
- Françoise de Brézé, Noblewoman and courtier.(d.1577)

== Deaths ==
- August 16 – Loyset Compère, French composer (b. c. 1445)
- September 21 – Louise of Valois, French princess (b. 1515)
