= 1518 =

1518 in various calendars
- Gregorian calendar: 1518; MDXVIII
- Ab urbe condita: 2271
- Armenian calendar: 967; ԹՎ ՋԿԷ
- Assyrian calendar: 6268
- Balinese saka calendar: 1439–1440
- Bengali calendar: 924–925
- Berber calendar: 2468
- English Regnal year: 9 Hen. 8 – 10 Hen. 8
- Buddhist calendar: 2062
- Burmese calendar: 880
- Byzantine calendar: 7026–7027
- Chinese calendar: 丁丑年 (Fire Ox); 4215 or 4008 — to — 戊寅年 (Earth Tiger); 4216 or 4009
- Coptic calendar: 1234–1235
- Discordian calendar: 2684
- Ethiopian calendar: 1510–1511
- Hebrew calendar: 5278–5279
- Hindu calendars
- Vikram Samvat: 1574–1575
- Shaka Samvat: 1439–1440
- Kali Yuga: 4618–4619
- Holocene calendar: 11518
- Igbo calendar: 518–519
- Iranian calendar: 896–897
- Islamic calendar: 923–924
- Japanese calendar: Eishō 15 (永正１５年)
- Javanese calendar: 1435–1436
- Julian calendar: 1518; MDXVIII
- Korean calendar: 3851
- Minguo calendar: 394 before ROC 民前394年
- Nanakshahi calendar: 50
- Thai solar calendar: 2060–2061
- Tibetan calendar: མེ་མོ་གླང་ལོ་ (female Fire-Ox); 1644 or 1263 or 491 — to — ས་ཕོ་སྟག་ལོ་ (male Earth-Tiger); 1645 or 1264 or 492

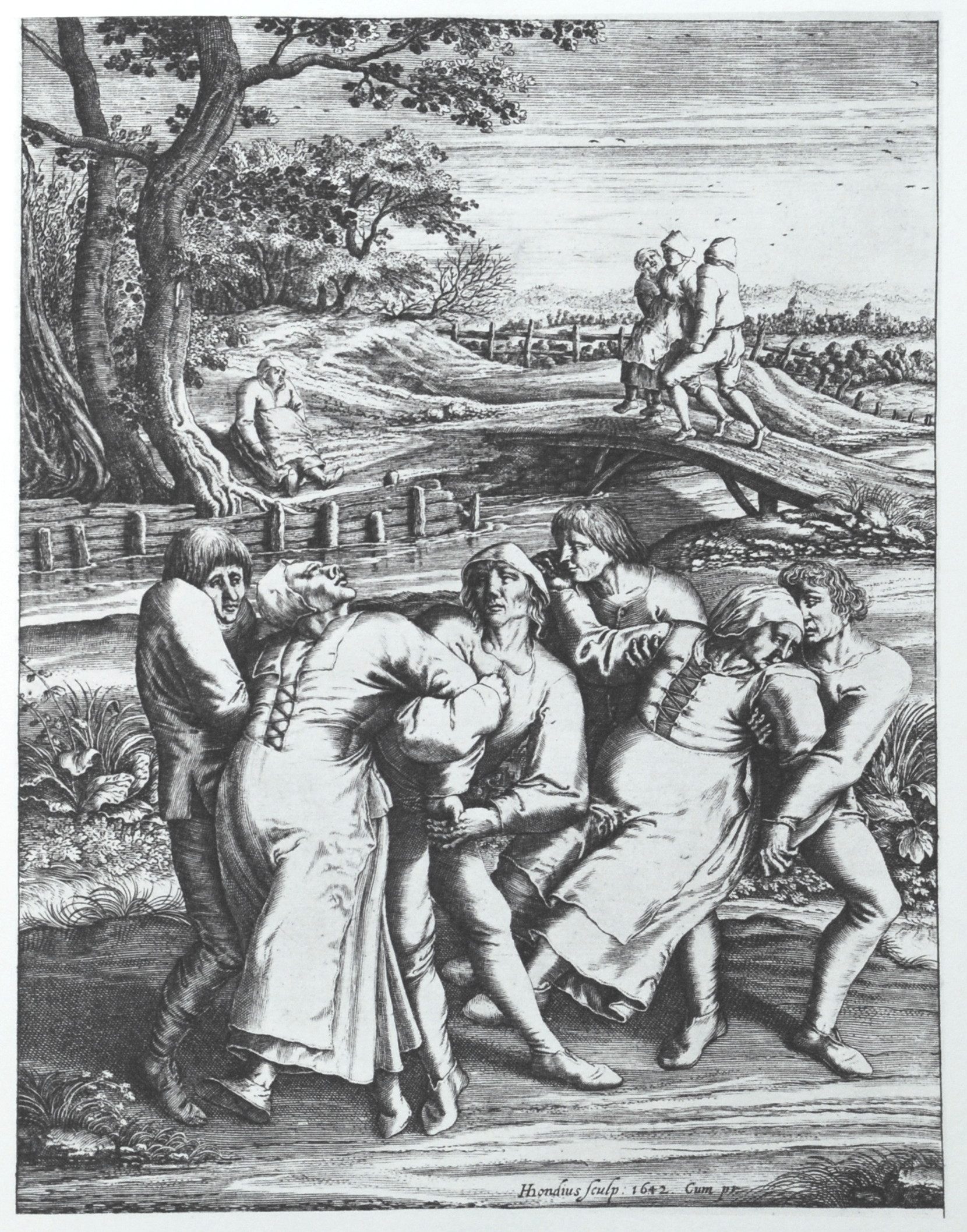
July 14: Dancing mania breaks out in Strasbourg in Europe

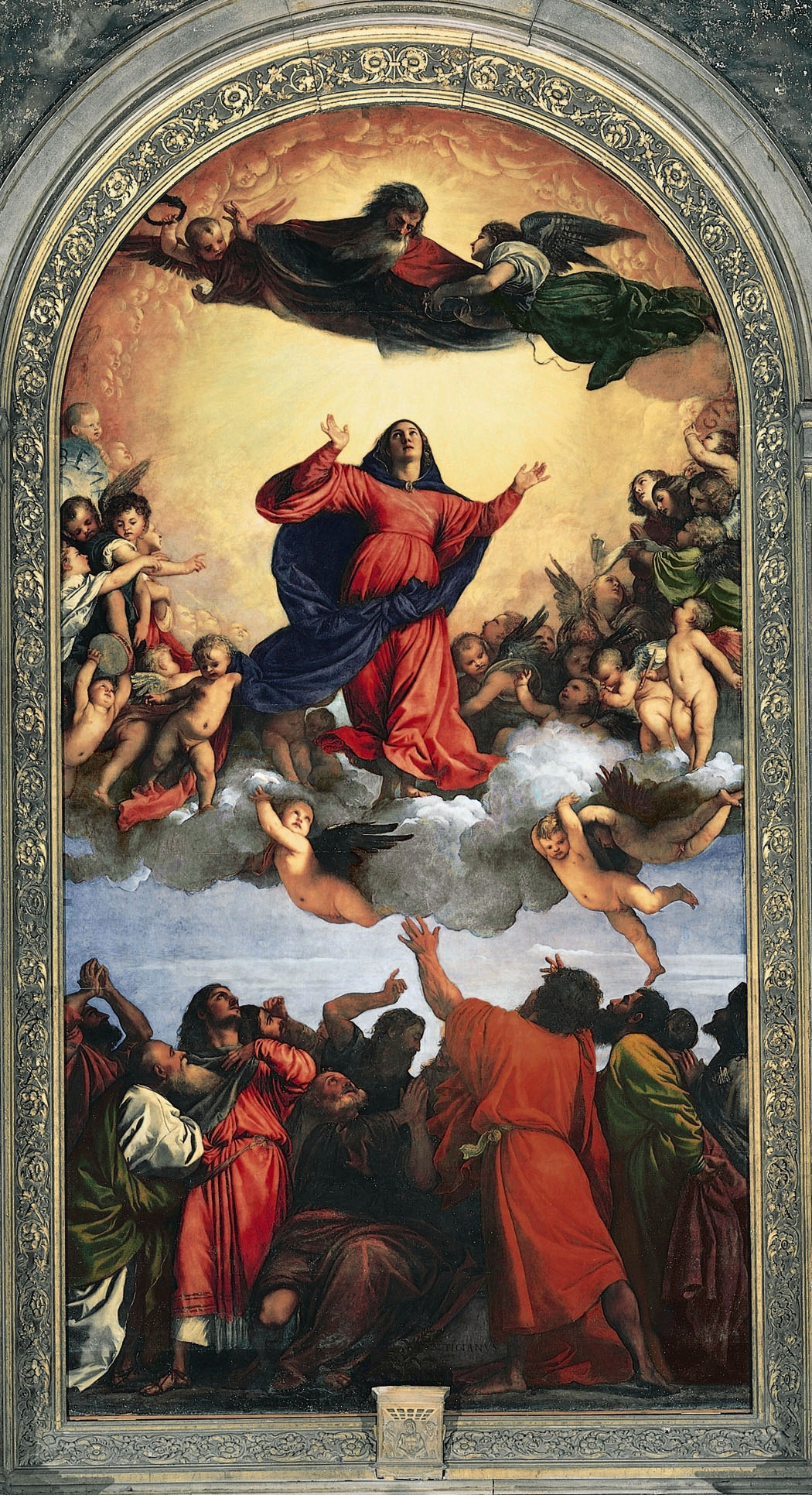
May 19: Titian's masterpiece Assumption of the Virgin is unveiled in Rome

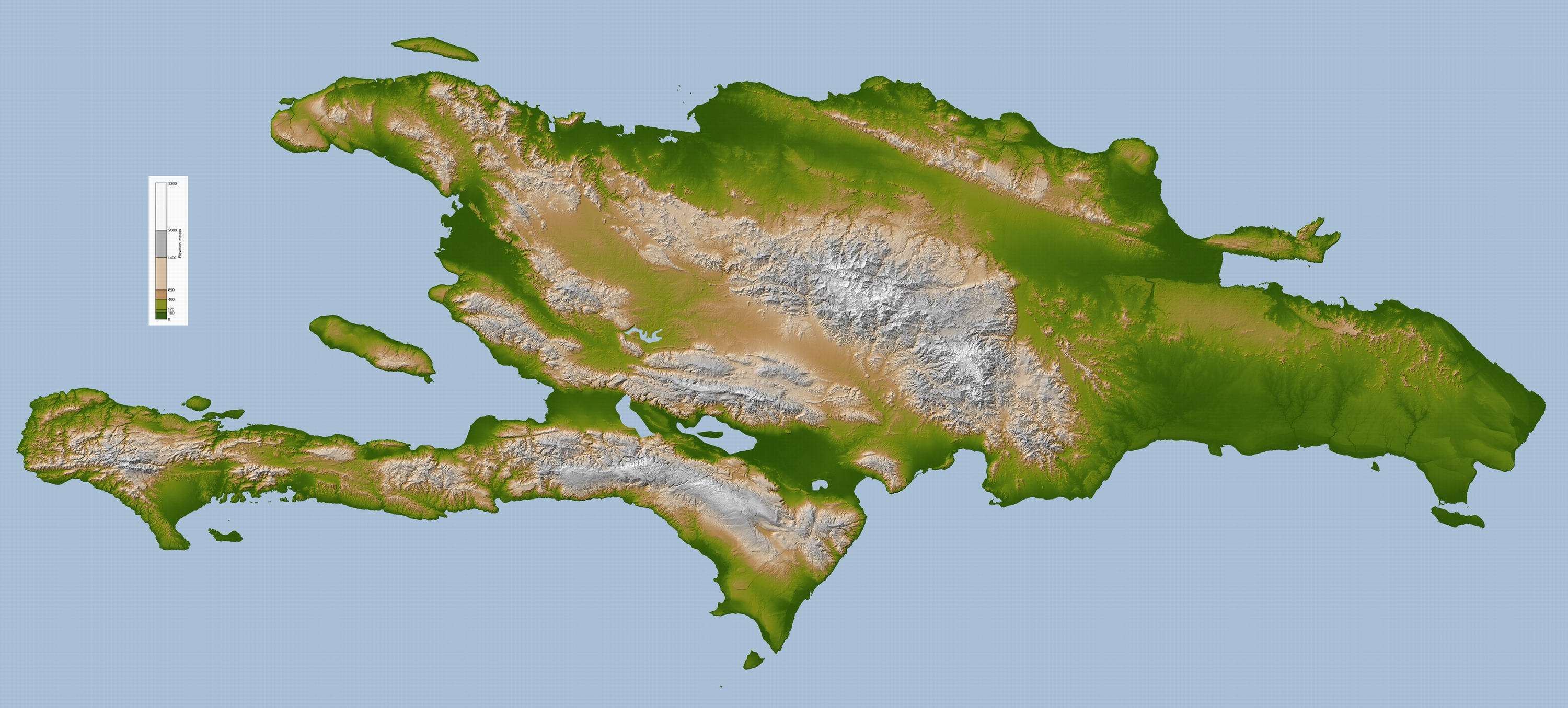
Tropical ants devastate crops on Hispaniola.

Year 1518 (MDXVIII) was a common year starting on Friday of the Julian calendar. Within much of Christian Europe, New Year's Day was celebrated on January 1, the rule in the Roman Empire since 45 BC, and in 1518, the year ran from January 1, 1518 to December 31, 1518. In England (until 1752) and Scandinavia, the year ran from the Feast of the Annunciation (March 25, 1518) to March 24, 1519; and in France (until 1565) from Easter Sunday (April 4, 1518) to April 23, 1519. For instance, the will of Leonardo da Vinci, drafted in Amboise on 23 April 1519, shows the legend "Given on the 23rd of April 1518, before Easter".* See Wikisource "1911 Encyclopædia Britannica/Easter".

== Events ==
=== January–March ===
- January 25 – Piri Mehmed Pasha is appointed as the new Grand Vizier of the Ottoman Empire by the Sultan Selim I, replacing Yunus Pasha, who was executed four months earlier on September 13.
- January 27 – Sir John Ernley is selected as the new Chief Justice of the Common Pleas of England by King King Henry VIII to replace the late Robert Rede, who died on January 8. Emley. He is replaced as Attorney General for England and Wales by John FitzJames.
- February 2 – In Valladolid in Spain, Frenchman Jean Sauvage, Chancellor of Burgundy is appointed by Spain's Prince Charles as the Chief Judge of the Cortes of Valladolid. The choice of a foreigner is resented by the members of the court and Sauvage is replaced at the Cortes by the Spanish Bishop Pedro Ruiz de la Mota.
- March 5 – The Dutch priest Erasmus of Rotterdam sends the new Ninety-five Theses of Martin Luther to England, delivering the Protestant manifesto to Sir Thomas More.
- March 22 – King Charles of Spain gives his approval for the Magellan expedition, initially for the purpose of finding a westward route from Spain to the "Spice Islands" (now the Maluku Islands in Indonesia), to avoid the more frequently-used eastward route around Africa. Veteran seaman Ferdinand Magellan and navigator Rui Faleiro, both of Portugal, had turned to Spain to fund the expedition after being refused by King Manuel of Portugal. The voyage proves to be further than expected and becomes the first to sail around the world.

=== April–June ===
- April 8 – Spanish conquistador Juan de Grijalva embarks from Cuba on a mission to explore and conquer Mexico, departing from Matanzas with four ships and 170 people.
- April 18 – The widowed Sigismund I the Old, King of Poland and Grand Duke of Lithuania, marries Milanese noblewoman Bona Sforza in Wawel Cathedral and she is crowned as Queen consort of Poland.
- April 26 – Martin Luther makes the first public defense of his views at a gathering of the Roman Catholic order of Augustinians, at what becomes known as the Heidelberg Disputation at a lecture hall at Heidelberg in the Electoral Palatinate in Germany. While there, he is challenged to a theological debate by Johann Eck, the German leader of the anti-Reformation movement.
- May 3 – Grijalva and his crew become the first Europeans to find Cozumel in Mexico.
- May 9 – A fleet of four Portuguese ships, commanded by João da Silveira from Portuguese India, arrived in Chittagong (now part of Bangladesh, but at the time part of the Sultanate of Bengal), reputed to be the wealthiest region in the Indian subcontinent.
- May 19 – In Venice, Renaissance artist Tiziano Vecellio, known as "Titian", unveils his painting Assumption of the Virgin, to the public.
- May 26 – A transit of Venus occurs, but a transit will not be observed or recorded until 120 years later, on December 4, 1639.
- May 30 – At the request of Pope Leo X of the Roman Catholic Church, Martin Luther, father of the Protestant Reformation, writes a lengthy summary of his theology.
- June 8 – The Girjalva expedition brings the first Europeans to the Yucatan Peninsula in Mexico, arriving at what is now the Tabasco state.

=== July–September ===
- July 14 – Dancing plague of 1518: A case of dancing mania breaks out in Strasbourg as a woman identified as "Frau Troffea" begins constant dancing that lasts for six days, after which fellow residents begin to join in. According to some historians, several people die from constant dancing.
- July 27 – Battle of Brännkyrka: The Kalmar Union, led by King Christian II of Denmark, is defeated by the Swedish regent Sten Sture the Younger.
- August 10 – Construction of the Manchester Grammar School is completed in England. The total cost of the project was £218 13s 5d.
- August 28 – King Charles of Spain issues a charter authorizing the transportation of slaves directly from Africa to the Spanish Americas. His decision changes the nature and scale of the transatlantic slave trade.
- September 8 – Diogo Lopes de Sequeira takes office as the new Governor of Portuguese India, replacing Lopo Soares de Albergaria.

=== October–December ===
- October 3 – The Treaty of London temporarily ensures peace in Western Europe.
- November 13 – Diego Velázquez de Cuéllar, the Spanish Colonial Governor of Cuba, is granted the office of Captain General of Yucatán, which comprises southern Mexico. Velázquez is also granted the exclusive right to conquer and colonize the new Yucatan Province, but turns the rights over to Francisco de Montejo in 1526.
- December 7 – The Deccan sultanates in southern India of Ahmadnagar, Berar, Bidar, Bijapur, and Golconda formally declare their independence from the Bahmani Sultanate.

=== Date unknown ===
- The Rajput Mewar Kingdom under Rana Sanga achieves a major victory over Sultan Ibrahim Lodi of Delhi.
- A swarm of stinging ants devastates crops on Hispaniola.
- Johann Froben publishes Erasmus's work Colloquies, which was unauthorized, and it took until 1519 that an authorized version would be published.
- Henricus Grammateus publishes Ayn neu Kunstlich Buech in Vienna, containing the earliest printed use of plus and minus signs for arithmetic.
- The remnants of The Abbasid Caliphate (stationed in Egypt under the Mamluk Sultanate hands over the title of caliph to the Ottoman Empire that had conquered Constantinople in 1453, 65 years earlier.

== Births ==
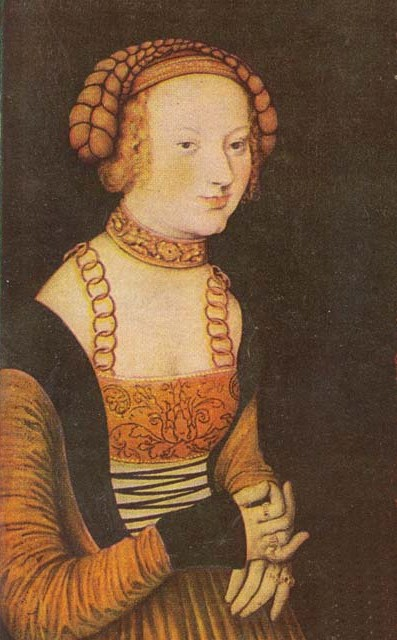
Sidonie of Saxony

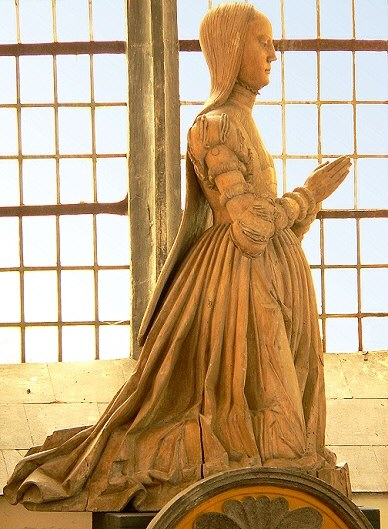
Clara of Saxe-Lauenburg

- February 2
  - Johann Hommel, German astronomer and mathematician (d. 1562)
  - Godfried van Mierlo, Dutch Dominican friar and bishop (d. 1587)
- February 7 – Johann Funck, German theologian (d. 1566)
- February 13 – Antonín Brus of Mohelnice, Moravian Catholic archbishop (d. 1580)
- February 20 – Georg, Count Palatine of Simmern-Sponheim, (d. 1569)
- February 21 – John of Denmark, Danish prince (d. 1532)
- February 28 – Francis III of Brittany, Duke of Brittany (d. 1536)
- March 8 – Sidonie of Saxony, Duchess of Brunswick-Calenberg (d. 1575)
- April 22 – King Antoine of Navarre, father of Henry IV of France (d. 1562)
- July 3 – Li Shizhen, Chinese physician, pharmacologist and mineralogist (d. 1593)
- August 8 – Conrad Lycosthenes, Alsatian humanist and encyclopedist (d. 1561)
- September/October – Tintoretto, Italian painter (d. 1594)
- November 26 – Guido Ascanio Sforza di Santa Fiora, Italian Catholic cardinal (d. 1564)
- December 13 – Clara of Saxe-Lauenburg, Princess of Saxe-Lauenburg and Duchess of Brunswick-Gifhorn by marriage (d. 1576)
- December 17 – Ernest III, Duke of Brunswick-Grubenhagen (d. 1567)
- December 19 – Enrique de Borja y Aragón, Spanish noble of the House of Borgia (d. 1540)
- date unknown
  - James Halyburton, Scottish reformer (d. 1589)
  - Hubert Languet, French diplomat and reformer (d. 1581)
  - Edmund Plowden, English legal scholar (d. 1585)
  - Mayken Verhulst (a.k.a. Marie Bessemers), Flemish artist (d. 1596 or 1599)
- possible – Catherine Howard, fifth queen consort of Henry VIII of England (b. between 1518 and 1524; d. 1542)

== Deaths ==
- February 9 – Jean IV de Rieux, Breton noble and Marshal (b. 1447)
- May 31 – Elisabeth of Brandenburg-Ansbach-Kulmbach, German margravine (b. 1494)
- July 10 – Sibylle of Baden, Countess consort of Hanau-Lichtenberg (b. 1485)
- August 16 – Loyset Compère, French composer (b. c. 1445)
- August 27 – Joan of Naples, queen consort of Naples (b. 1478)
- November 20
  - Marmaduke Constable, English soldier (b. c. 1455)
  - Pierre de La Rue, Flemish composer (b. c. 1452)
- November 24 – Vannozza dei Cattanei, mistress of Pope Alexander VI (b. 1442)
- December – Moxammat Amin of Kazan, khan of Kazan (b. c. 1469)
- December 5 – Gian Giacomo Trivulzio, Italian military commander (b. c. 1440)
- December 27 – Mahmood Shah Bahmani II, sultan of the Bahmani Sultanate (b. c. 1470)
- date unknown
  - Kabir, Indian mystic (b. 1440)
  - Oruç Reis, Ottoman corsair, brother of Hayreddin Barbarossa
  - Guido Mazzoni, sculptor (b. c. 1445)
  - Muhammad ibn Azhar ad-Din, sultan of Adal (assassinated) (b. c. 1473)
  - Basil Solomon, Syriac Orthodox Maphrian of the East.
