= 1515 in France =

- Decades: 1490s; 1500s; 1510s; 1520s; 1530s
- See also: History of France; Timeline of French history; List of years in France

Events from the year 1515 in France.

== Incumbents ==
- Monarch – Louis XII (until January 1), then Francis I

== Events ==
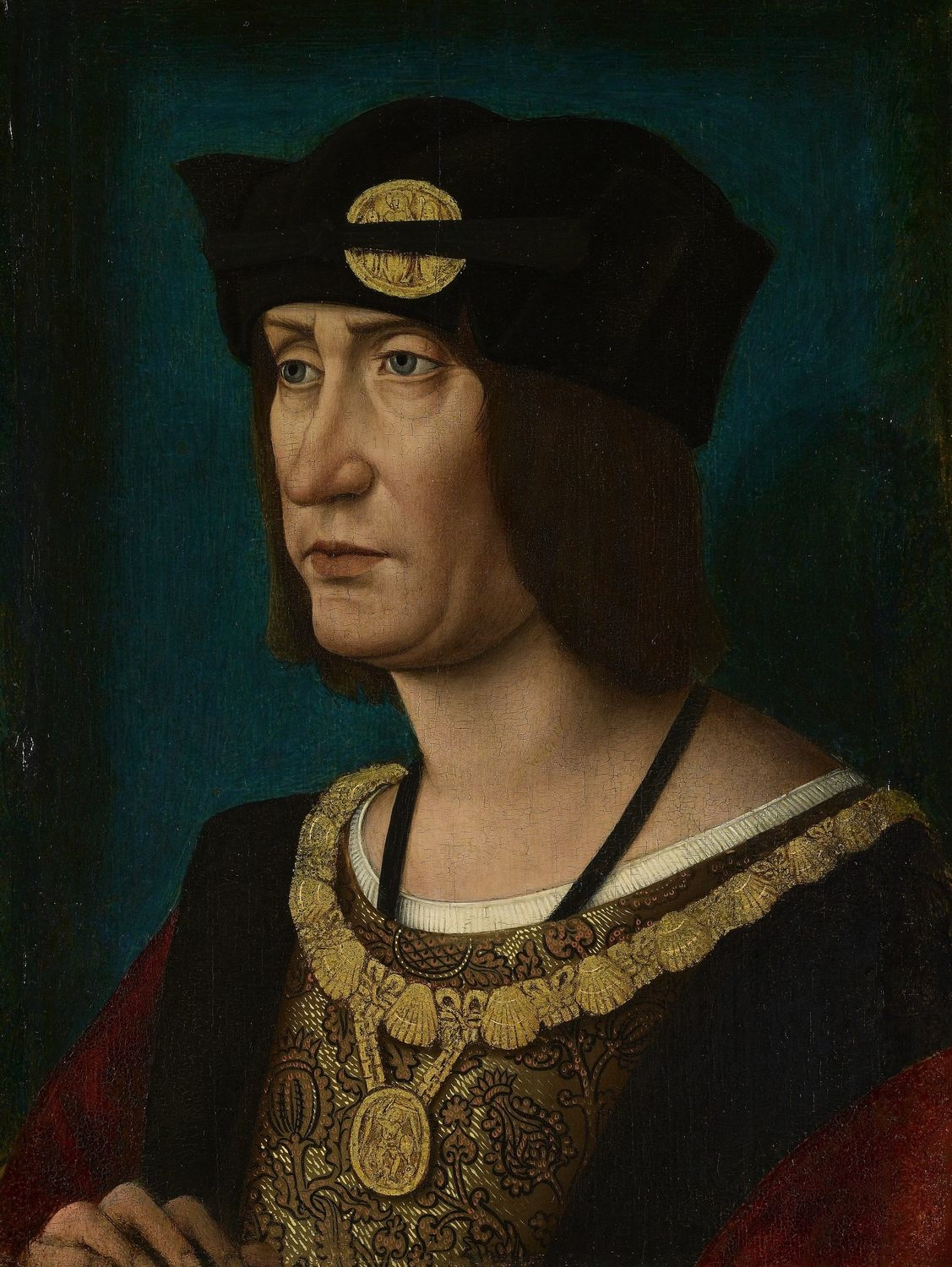
Louis XII, King of France 1498–1515

- 1 January – Louis XII dies, and Francis I becomes the new King of France.

== Births ==
- August 19 -Louise of Valois daughter of King Frances I (d.1518)
- November 22 – Mary of Guise, French noblewoman and Queen of Scotland (d.1560)

=== Date unknown ===
- Sebastian Castellio, preacher and theologian (d.1563 in the Swiss Confederacy)
- Petrus Ramus, humanist (d.1572)
- Nicolas Denisot, poet and painter (d.1559)

== Deaths ==
- January 1 – Louis XII, King of France (b.1462)

=== Date unknown ===
- Jacques Almain, professor of theology.
