= 1517 in France =

- Decades: 1490s; 1500s; 1510s; 1520s; 1530s
- See also: History of France; Timeline of French history; List of years in France

Events from the year 1517 in France.

== Incumbents ==
- Monarch – Francis I

== Events ==
- May 10 – The coronation of Queen Consort Claude of France, wife of King Francis I, takes place at the Basilica of St Denis with Cardinal Philippe de Luxembourg performing the ceremony.
- August 26– Treaty of Rouen, treaty between France and Scotland.

=== Date unknown ===
- The Hôtel de Ville, Arras completes construction.
- The city of Le Havre is founded by King Francis I and construction on its port is started.

== Births ==
- July 10 – Odet de Coligny, French cardinal and Protestant (d. 1571)
- July 25 – Jacques Pelletier du Mans, French mathematician (d. 1582)
- August 20 – Antoine Perrenot de Granvelle, statesman, French Catholic cardinal (d. 1586)
- August 23 - Francis I, Duke of Lorraine, French noblemen. (d.1545).

=== Date unknown ===
- Hubert Languet, French diplomat and reformer (d. 1581)
