= 1538 in France =

- Decades: 1510s; 1520s; 1530s; 1540s; 1550s
- See also: History of France; Timeline of French history; List of years in France

Events from the year 1538 in France.

== Incumbents ==
- Monarch – Francis I

== Events ==
- June 18 – Truce of Nice: Peace is declared between Emperor Charles V and Francis I of France.

== Births ==
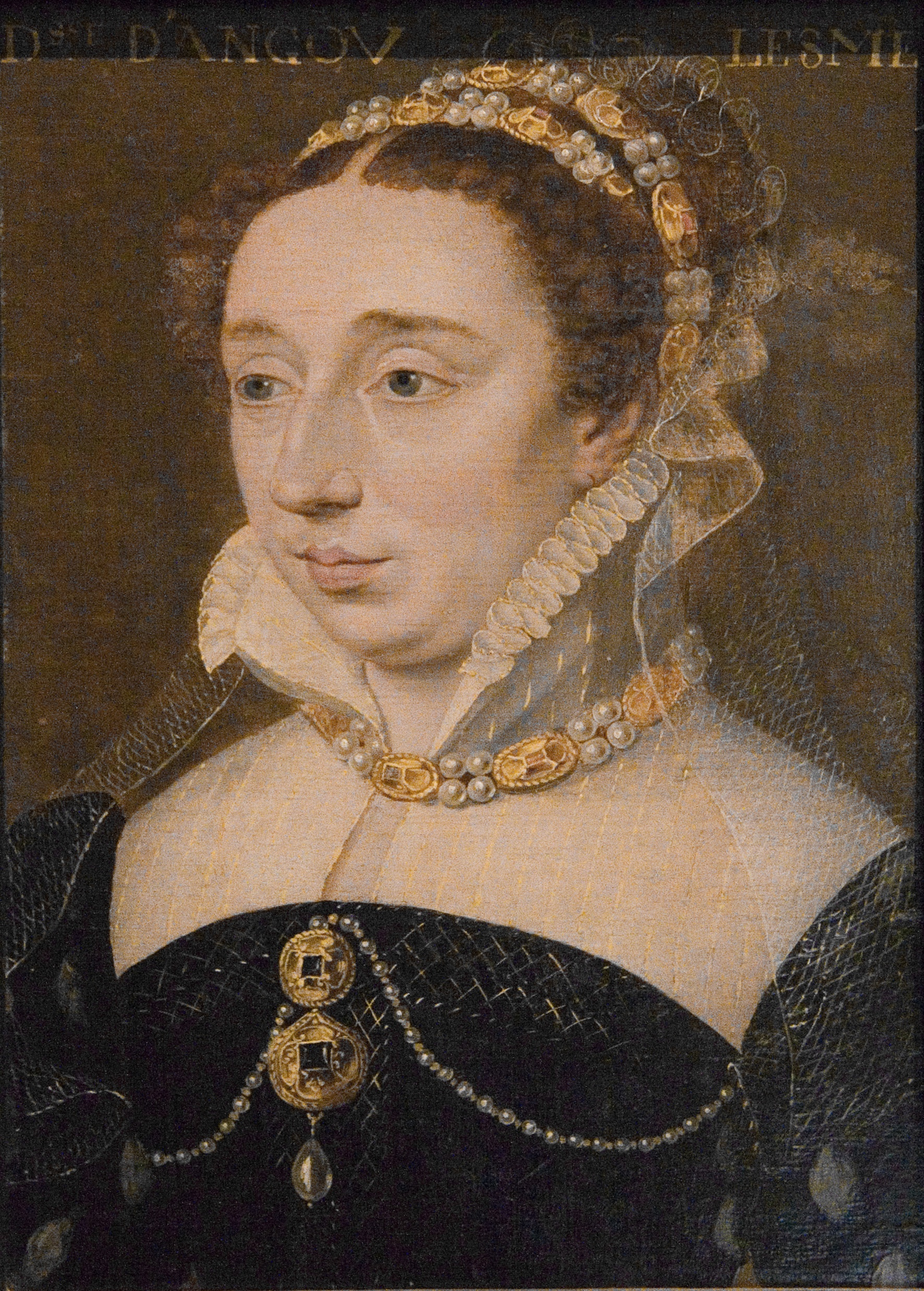
Diane de France

- July 25 – Diane de France, duchess (d.1619)

=== Full date missing ===
- Guillaume de Baillou, physician (d.1616)
- Nicolas Barnaud, writer, physician and alchemist (d.1604)
- François de Bar, monk and scholar (d.1606)
- Amadis Jamyn, poet (d.1593)

== Deaths ==
- October – Maistre Jhan, composer (b. c.1485)
