= G. T. van Ysselsteyn =

Gerardina Tjaberta van Ysselsteyn
- Born: Gerardina Tjabertha van IJsselsteijn; 12 September 1892; Rotterdam, Netherlands
- Died: 1975 (aged 82–83)

Gerardina Tjaberta van Ysselsteyn (1892 – 1975) was a Dutch art historian and textile specialist who wrote several books on the Dutch textile industry.

Van Ysselsteyn was born in Rotterdam as the daughter of the civil engineer Hendrik Albert van IJsselsteyn, Minister of Agriculture and Economics of the Netherlands from 1918 to 1922, after whom the village of Ysselsteyn has been named.

In 1931, van Ysselsteyn conjectured that the Huguenot tract Vindiciae contra tyrannos published in 1579, whose authorship is still unclear, was a collaboration between Hubert Languet and Philippe de Mornay.

== Publications ==
- van Ysselsteyn, G.T. (1932). Het Beiersche vorstenbezit.
- van Ysselsteyn, G. T. (1936). Geschiedenis der tapijtweverijen in de noordelijke Nederlanden [History of Tapestry Weaving in the Northern Netherlands].
- van Ysselsteyn, G. T. (1946). Van linnen en linnenkasten.
- Europees porselein : de geschiedenis van een geheim en zijn toepassing, 1949
- White figured linen damask: From the 15th to the beginning of the 19th century, 1962
- van Ysselsteyn, G. T. (1969). Tapestry, the Most Expensive Industry of the 15th and 16th Centuries: a Renewed Research Into Technic, Origin and Iconography. Van Goor.
- De wandtapijten in het stadhuis van Maastricht (The tapestries in the Town Hall of Maastricht), 1972
