= 1530 in France =

- Decades: 1510s; 1520s; 1530s; 1540s; 1550s
- See also: History of France; Timeline of French history; List of years in France

Events from the year 1530 in France.

== Incumbents ==
- Monarch – Francis I

== Events ==
- July 1 - The two French Princess the Dauphin François and Henri, are finally released from captivity and returned to France as part of the Treaty of Cambrai.
- July 7 - King Francis I marries his second wife Eleanor of Austria at the Monastery of Beyries. Making him and his former enemy, Holy roman emperor Charles V brothers in law.
- Collège de France established

== Births ==
- October 30 – Charles de Rambouillet, French bishop and cardinal (d.1587)
- November 1 – Étienne de La Boétie, French judge and political theorist (d.1563)

=== Date Unknown ===
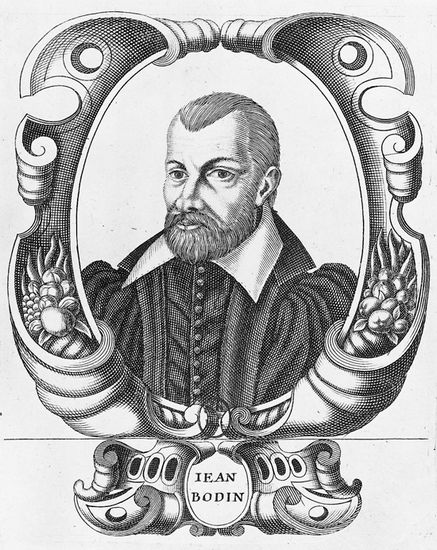
Jean Bodin

- Jean Bodin, philosopher and politician (d.1596).
- Jean Nicot, diplomat and scholar (d.1600)
- Charlotte de Laval, noblewoman (d.1568)
- Edmond Auger, Jesuit (d.1591)
- Nicholas Rémy, French magistrate (d.1616)

== Deaths ==
=== Date Unknown ===
- Estienne de La Roche, mathematician (b.1470)
