= 1526 in France =

- Decades: 1500s; 1510s; 1520s; 1530s; 1540s
- See also: History of France; Timeline of French history; List of years in France

Events from the year 1526 in France.

== Incumbents ==
- Monarch – Francis I

== Events ==
- January 14 – Treaty of Madrid was signed by king Francis I stipulating the abandonment of Burgundy, and French claims in northern Italy and Artois .
- February 6 – Suleiman the Magnificent, agrees to form a military alliance with France, after King Francis I sends a proposal by way of his envoy, Jean Frangipani.
- March 6 – King Francis I of France is released from captivity in Spain after having signed the Treaty of Madrid.
- March 17 – King Francis I crosses from the Bidasoa River from Spain into France, while at the same time, his sons the Dauphin Prince François and Prince Henri, cross into Spain to take his place as hostages to guarantee France's compliance with the Madrid Treaty.
- May 22 - King Francis I creates the League of Cognac to unite France with Florence, Venice, Milan and the Papacy against the Holy Roman Emperor Charles V.

== Births ==
- April 12 – Muretus, French humanist (d. 1585)
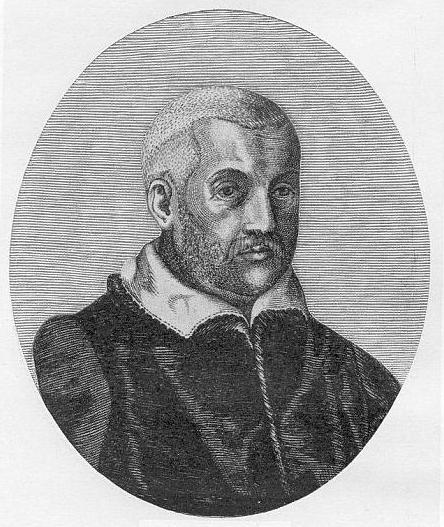
  Marc Antoine Muret (Muretus) 1526–1585

=== Date Unknown ===
- Adam de Craponne, French engineer (d.1576)
