= 1537 in France =

- Decades: 1510s; 1520s; 1530s; 1540s; 1550s
- See also: History of France; Timeline of French history; List of years in France

Events from the year 1537 in France.

== Incumbents ==
- Monarch – Francis I

== Events ==
- July 30, Representatives of the French king and the regent of the Holy Roman Emperor in the Netherlands,Mary of Hungary, agree to a secession of hostilities for 10 months.
- December 28, the Ordonnance de Montpellier is signed by king Francis I requiring every book publisher in France to deposit copies of their books in the royal library.

== Births ==
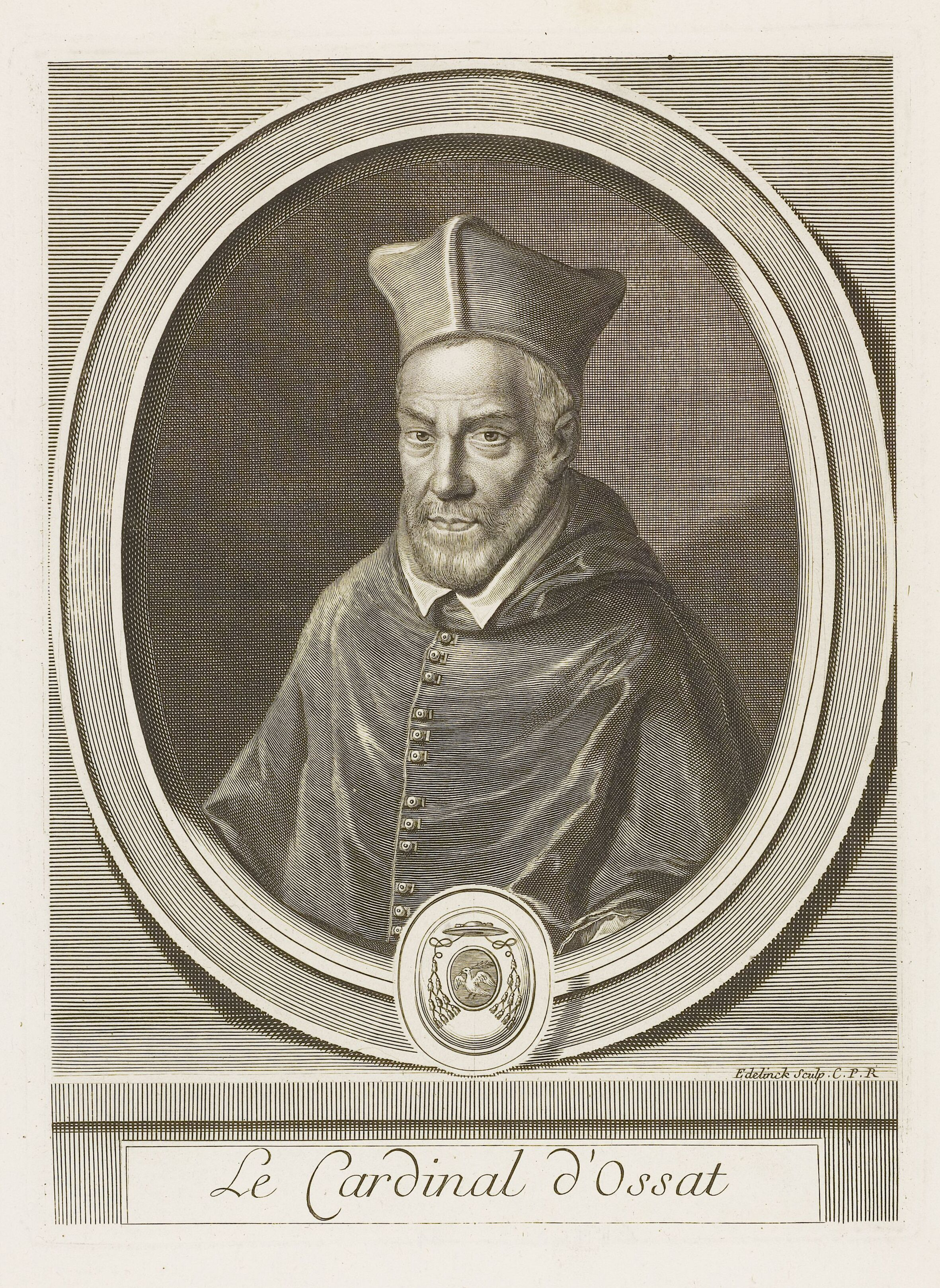
Arnaud d'Ossat

- July 20- Arnaud d'Ossat, prolific French diplomat and cardinal. (d.1604)

=== Date Unknown ===
- Claude Chevallon, French printer (b.1479)

== Deaths ==
- July 7 - Madeleine of Valois, Daughter of King Francis I and Queen of Scotland (b.1520)
