= 1533 in France =

- Decades: 1510s; 1520s; 1530s; 1540s; 1550s
- See also: History of France; Timeline of French history; List of years in France

Events from the year 1533 in France.

== Incumbents ==
- Monarch – Francis I

== Events ==
- October 28 - Catherine de’ Medici and Henry II, future Queen and King of France, got married in Marseille.
- Remodeling and expansion of the Hôtel de Ville, Paris starts.

== Births ==
- February 28 – Michel de Montaigne, French essayist (d. 1592)

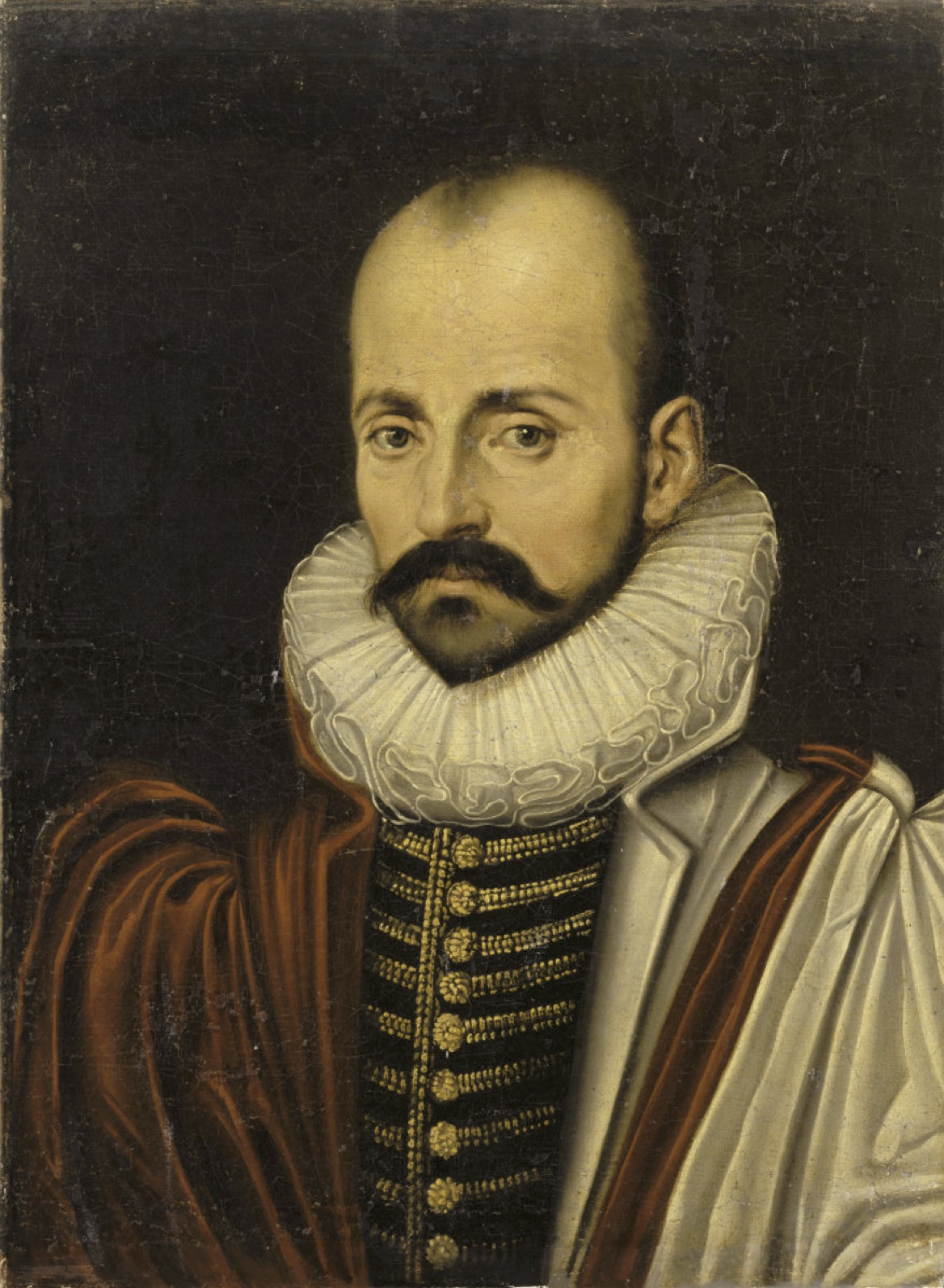
Michel de Montaigne

=== Date Unknown ===
- Pierre de Gondi, French Bishop and Cardinal (d.1616)

== Deaths ==
- August 3– Philibert de Chalon, Prince of Orange (b.1502).
- September 24 - Jean d'Orléans-Longueville, Roman Catholic Cardinal (b.1484).
