= 1525 in France =

- Decades: 1500s; 1510s; 1520s; 1530s; 1540s
- See also: History of France; Timeline of French history; List of years in France

Events from the year 1525 in France.

== Incumbents ==
- Monarch – Francis I

== Events ==
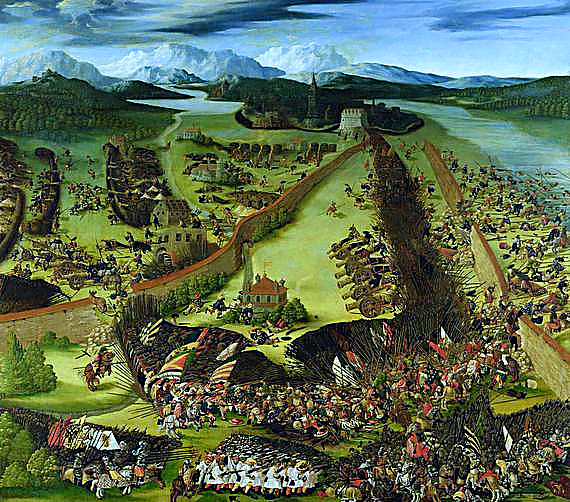
Battle of Pavia illustration by Ruprecht Heller

- February 24 –The French army is defeated in the Battle of Pavia, this was the decisive engagement of the Italian War of 1521–26.
- August 30 – Treaty of the More was signed between Henry VIII of England and queen regent Louise of Savoy restoring relation between France and England.

== Births ==
=== Date Unknown ===
- René Boyvin, engraver (d. 1598)
- Guillaume Le Bé, punch cutter and engraver (d. 1598)
- Claude de Sainctes, French Catholic theologist and author (d. 1591)

== Deaths ==
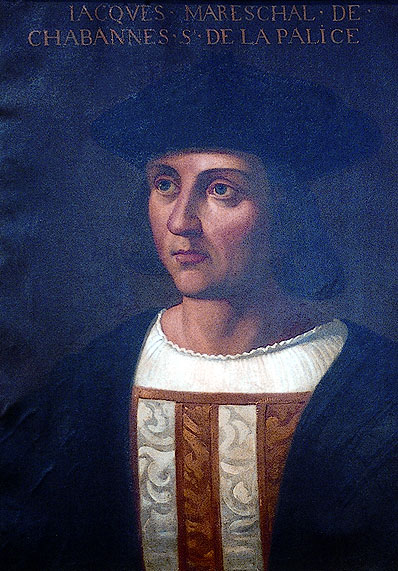
Marshal Jacques de La Palice 1470-1524

- February 24 – Louis II de la Trémoille, French general (b. 1460)
- February 24 – Galéas de Saint-Séverin, French-Italian condottiere (b. 1460s)
- February 24 – Jacques de La Palice, French nobleman and military officer (b. 1470)
- February 24 – Guillaume Gouffier, French army commander (b. 1488)

=== Date Unknown ===
- Guillaume Crétin, poet (b. c. 1460)
- René of Savoy, nobleman and soldier (b. 1473)
- Antoine de Longueval, singer and composer (fl. 1498)
- François de Lorraine, military officer (b. 1506)
