= 1536 in France =

- Decades: 1510s; 1520s; 1530s; 1540s; 1550s
- See also: History of France; Timeline of French history; List of years in France

Events from the year 1536 in France.

== Incumbents ==
- Monarch – Francis I

== Events ==
- February 29 - Francis I seizes control of Savoy as War resumes between France and Charles V, Holy Roman Emperor. Turin was captured in the next week or two.
- Charles V triumphally enters Rome following the Via Triuphalis and delivers a speech before the pope and college of cardinals publicly challenging the king of France to a duel.

== Births ==
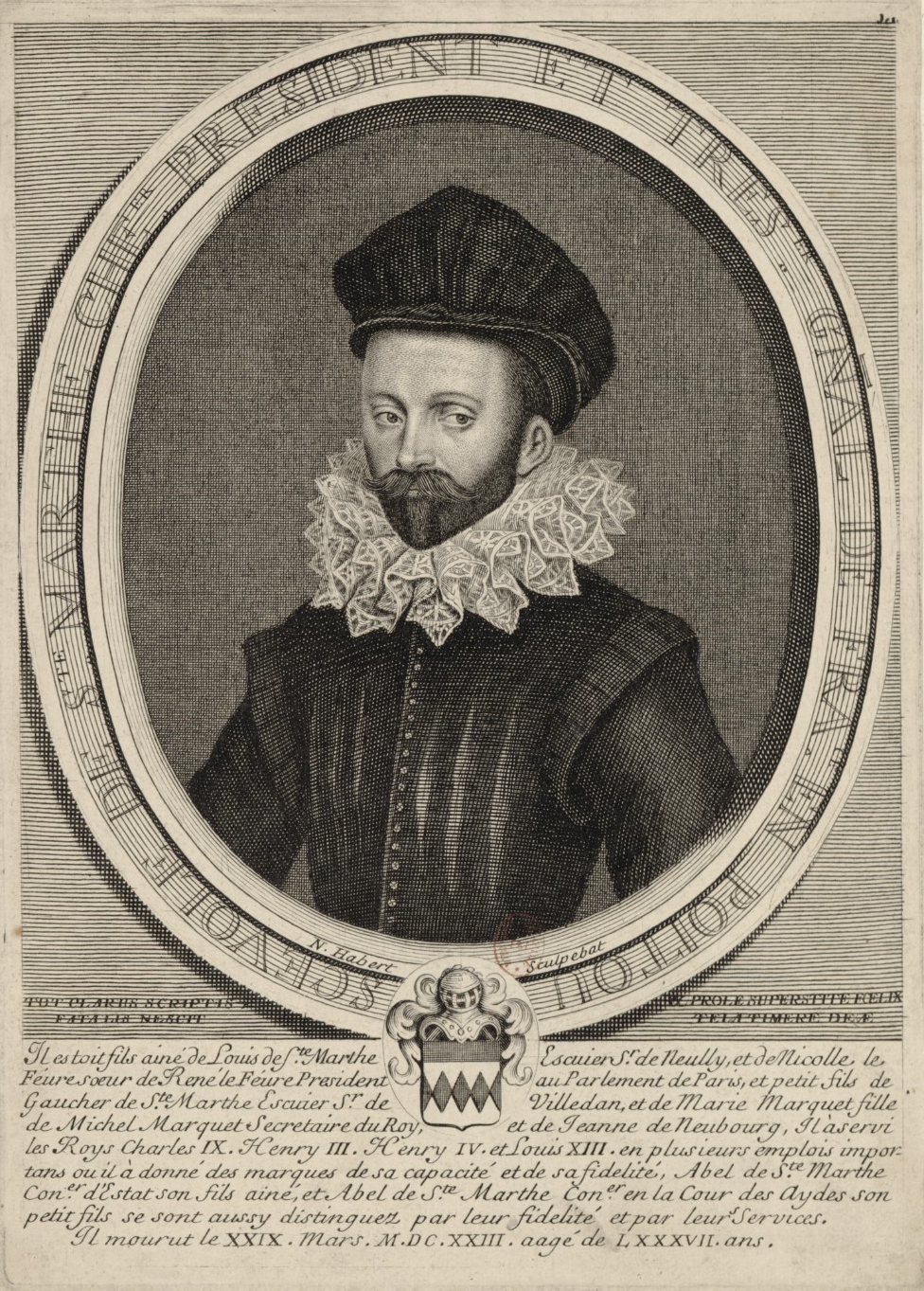
Scévole de Sainte-Marthe

- February 2 – Scévole de Sainte-Marthe, French poet (d. 1623)

=== Date Unknown ===
- Jean Vauquelin de la Fresnaye, French poet (d.1606/1608)

== Deaths ==
- February 28 – Francis III, Duke of Brittany, Duke of Brittany (d. 1536)

=== Date Unknown ===
- Jacques Lefèvre d'Étaples, French theologian and humanist (b. c. 1450)
