= 1523 in France =

- Decades: 1500s; 1510s; 1520s; 1530s; 1540s
- See also: History of France; Timeline of French history; List of years in France

Events from the year 1523 in France.

== Incumbents ==
- Monarch – Francis I

== Events ==
- June 8 -King Francis I bans the dispatch of money from the French court to Rome and expels the papal nuncio.
- Charles III, Duke of Bourbon, plotted against King Francis I allaying with the Habsburgs. The plot ultimately failed, and Charles fled France.

== Birth ==
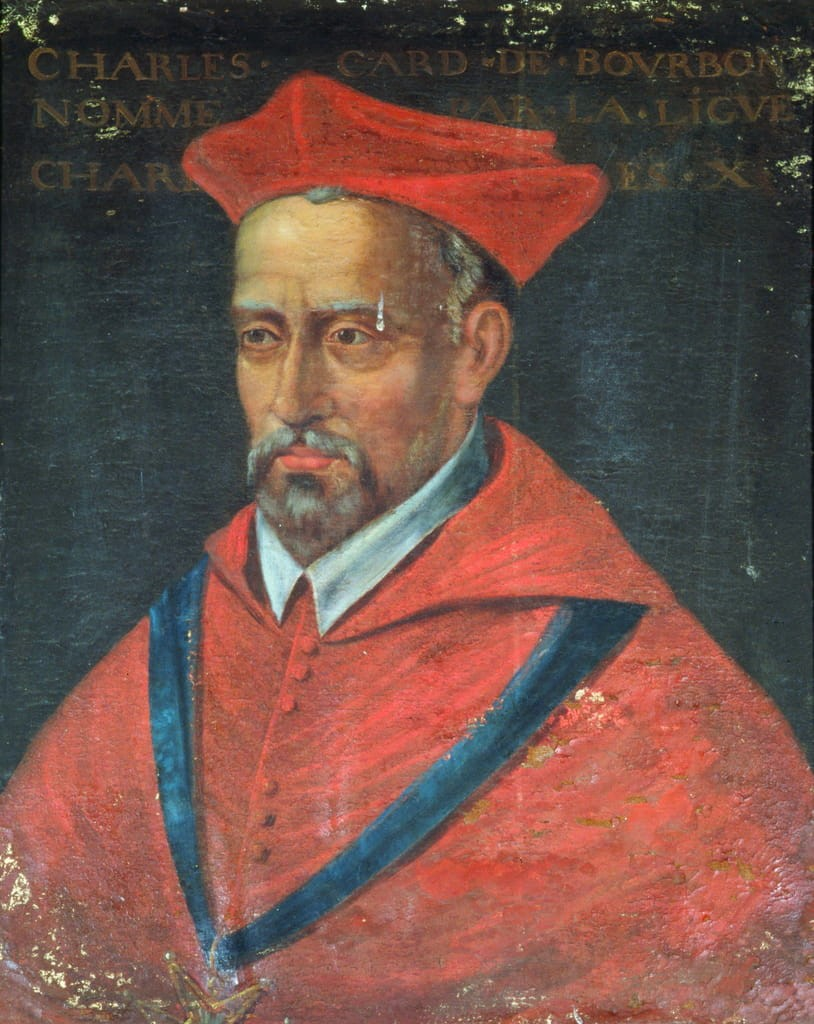
- Archbishop of Rouen Charles de Bourbon 1523-1590
  April 5 - Blaise de Vigenère, French diplomat, translator and the creator of the Vigenère cipher.(d.1596)
- June 5- Margaret of Valois, Daughter of king Francis I, Duchess of Berry and Duchess of Savoy by marriage. (d.1574)
- September 22- Charles de Bourbon French nobleman and Archbishop of Rouen (d.1590)

== Deaths ==
- August 8- Jean Vallière, a French friar who was the first protestant executed on a charge of heresy in France.
