= 1524 in France =

- Decades: 1500s; 1510s; 1520s; 1530s; 1540s
- See also: History of France; Timeline of French history; List of years in France

Events from the year 1524 in France.

== Incumbents ==
- Monarch – Francis I

== Events ==
- Formation of the Franco-Polish alliance
- Italian campaign of 1524–25

== Births ==
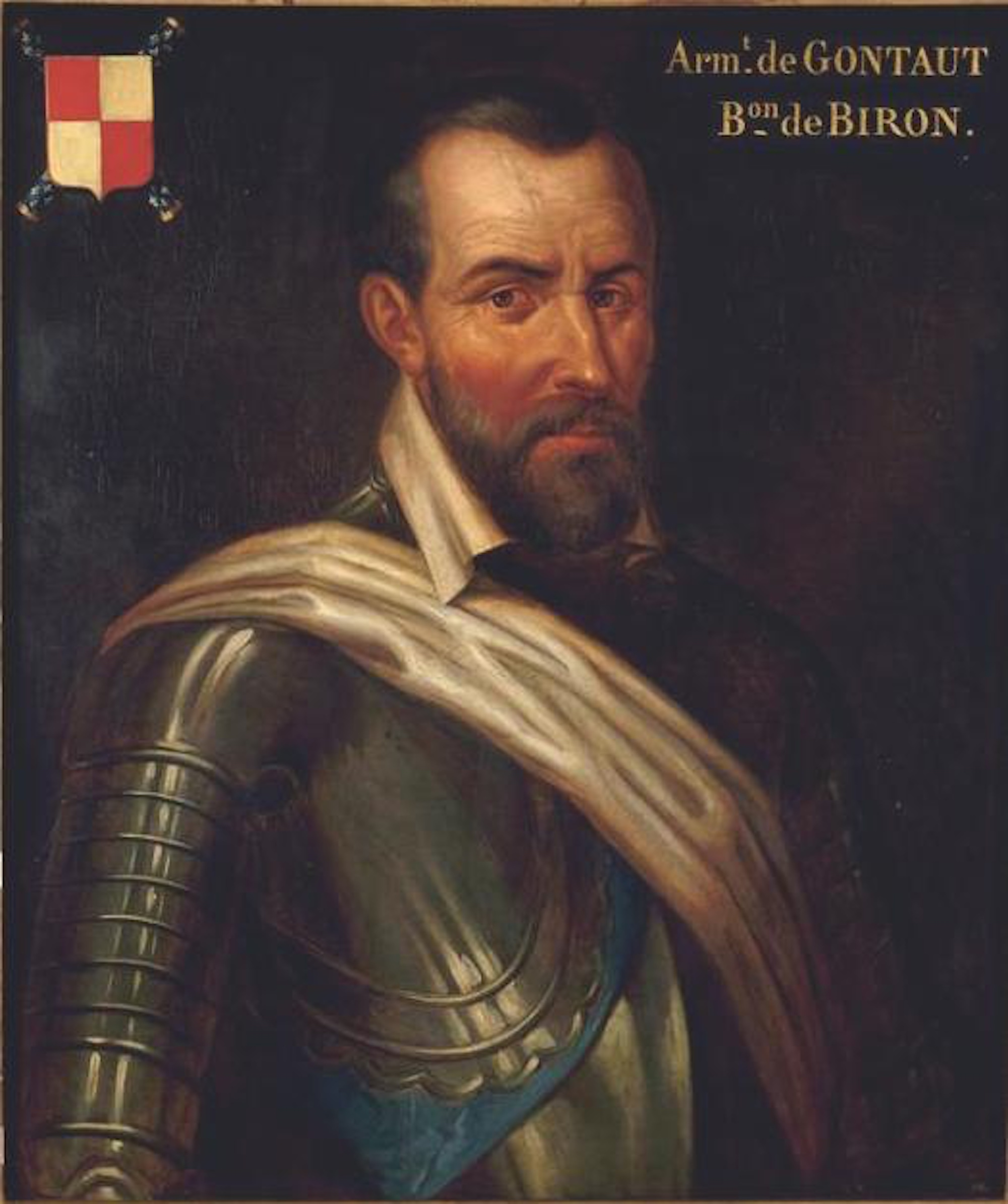
Armand de Gontaut, baron de Biron

- February 17 – Charles, Cardinal of Lorraine (d. 1574)
- October 16 – Nicolas of Lorraine, Duke of Mercœur (d. 1577).
- September 11 – Pierre de Ronsard, poet (d. 1585)

=== Full date missing ===
- Armand de Gontaut, baron de Biron, soldier (d. 1592).
- Gilles de Noailles, diplomat (d. 1600)

== Deaths ==
- April 30 – Pierre Terrail, seigneur de Bayard, soldier (b. 1473)
- July 20 – Claude of France, Queen of France, the first wife of Francis I (b. 1499).
- September 18 – Charlotte of France, princess (b. 1516)

=== Full date missing ===
- Étienne de Poncher, prelate and diplomat (b. 1446)
