= 1532 in France =

- Decades: 1510s; 1520s; 1530s; 1540s; 1550s
- See also: History of France; Timeline of French history; List of years in France

Events from the year 1532 in France.

== Incumbents ==
- Monarch – Francis I

== Events ==
- August 13 – Union of Brittany and France: The Duchy of Brittany is absorbed into the Kingdom of France.
- October 21 – King Francis I meets with Henry VIII of England for the first time in 12 years at Saint-Inglevert, where they agreed to form an alliance against their common enemies.
- Church of Royal Monastery of Brou completed.
- The Paris Parlement has the city's beggars arrested "to force them to work in the sewers, chained together in pairs".

== Births ==
- February 19 – Jean-Antoine de Baïf, poet and member of La Pléiade (d.1589)

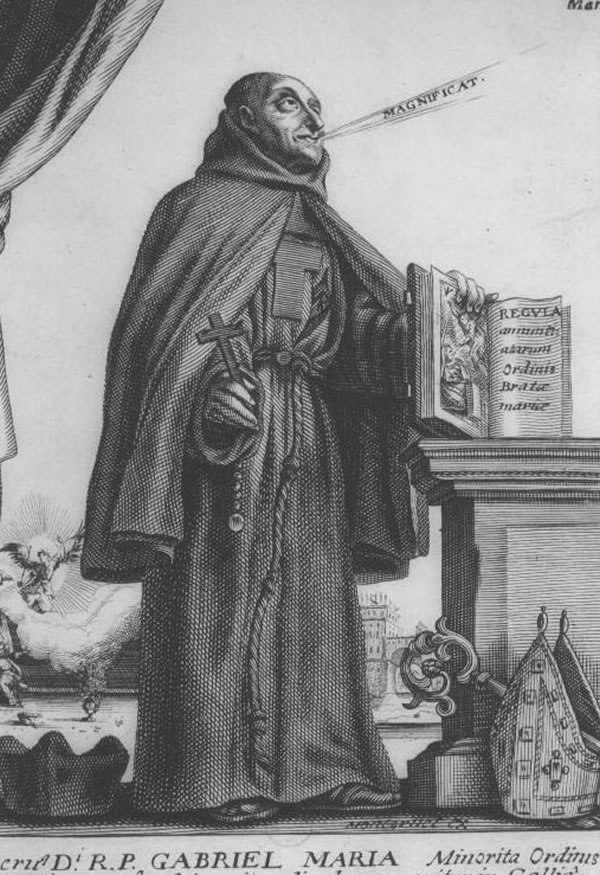
Gilbert Nicolas

=== Date Unknown ===
- Étienne Jodelle, dramatist and poet associated with La Pléiade (d.1573)

== Deaths ==
- August 27- Gilbert Nicolas, Catholic priest and member of the Order of Friars Minor (b. c. 1462)

=== Date Unknown ===
- Jeanne de la Font, poet and patron of culture (b.1500)
