= 1539 in France =

- Decades: 1510s; 1520s; 1530s; 1540s; 1550s
- See also: History of France; Timeline of French history; List of years in France

Events from the year 1539 in France.

== Events ==
- January 12 - France, Spain and the Holy Roman Empire agree to make no further alliances with England.
- August - The Ordinance of Villers-Cotterêts is signed, the oldest law in France remaining today.
- The Château de Saint-Germain-en-Laye, a former royal palace, is rebuilt.

== Births ==
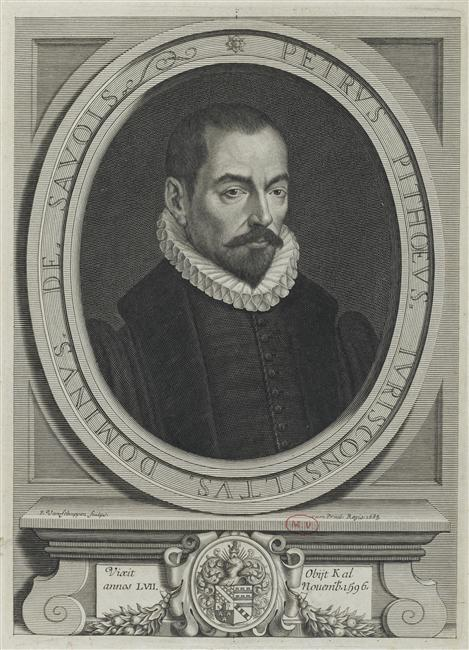
Pierre Pithou

- May 26 - Renée of Bourbon, Duchess of Lorraine (b.1494)
- November 21 - Pierre Pithou, a lawyer and scholar, is born in Troyes, France. (d.1596)

=== Date Unknown ===
- Olivier de Serres, author and soil scientist (d.1619)
