= 1519 in France =

- Decades: 1490s; 1500s; 1510s; 1520s; 1530s
- See also: History of France; Timeline of French history; List of years in France

Events from the year 1519 in France.

== Incumbents ==
- Monarch – Francis I

== Events ==
- University of Auvergne established
- King Francis I loses the empirical election for the Holy Roman Emperor title to Charles V.

== Births ==
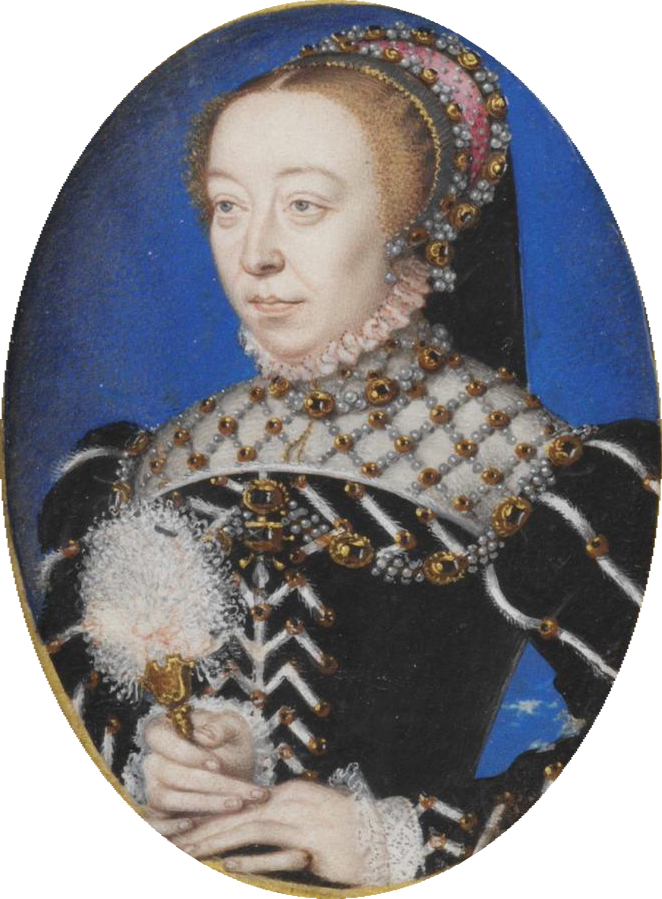
- Queen Catherine de' Medici (1519-1589)
  February 17– Francis, Duke of Guise, soldier and politician (d.1563)
- March 31-Henry II of France, King of France (d.1559)
- April 13 - Catherine de' Medici, queen of France (d.1589).
- July 2– François de Noailles, diplomat (d. 1585)

=== Full date missing ===
- Theodore Beza, Protestant reformer (d.1605).
- Matthieu Cointerel, cardinal (d.1585)
- Gaspard II de Coligny, soldier and Huguenot leader.(d.1572)

== Deaths ==
- May 2 – Leonardo da Vinci, Italian painter and scientist, who worked in the court of King Francis I (b.1452)
- June 2 – Philippe de Luxembourg, French bishop and Cardinal (b.1445)
- September 9 – René de Prie, French bishop and Cardinal (b.1451)
- November 27 – Antoine Bohier Du Prat, French bishop and Cardinal (b.1460)
