= 1521 in France =

- Decades: 1500s; 1510s; 1520s; 1530s; 1540s
- See also: History of France; Timeline of French history; List of years in France

Events from the year 1521 in France.

== Incumbents ==
- Monarch – Francis I

== Events ==
- 30 June – Battle of Esquiroz: French forces under Henri d'Albret, exiled King of Navarre, are defeated by the Spanish and forced to abandon their attempt to recover Henri's kingdom.
- August 20 – Siege of Mézières Armies of the Holy Roman Empire besiege the French town of Mézières for 3 weeks.
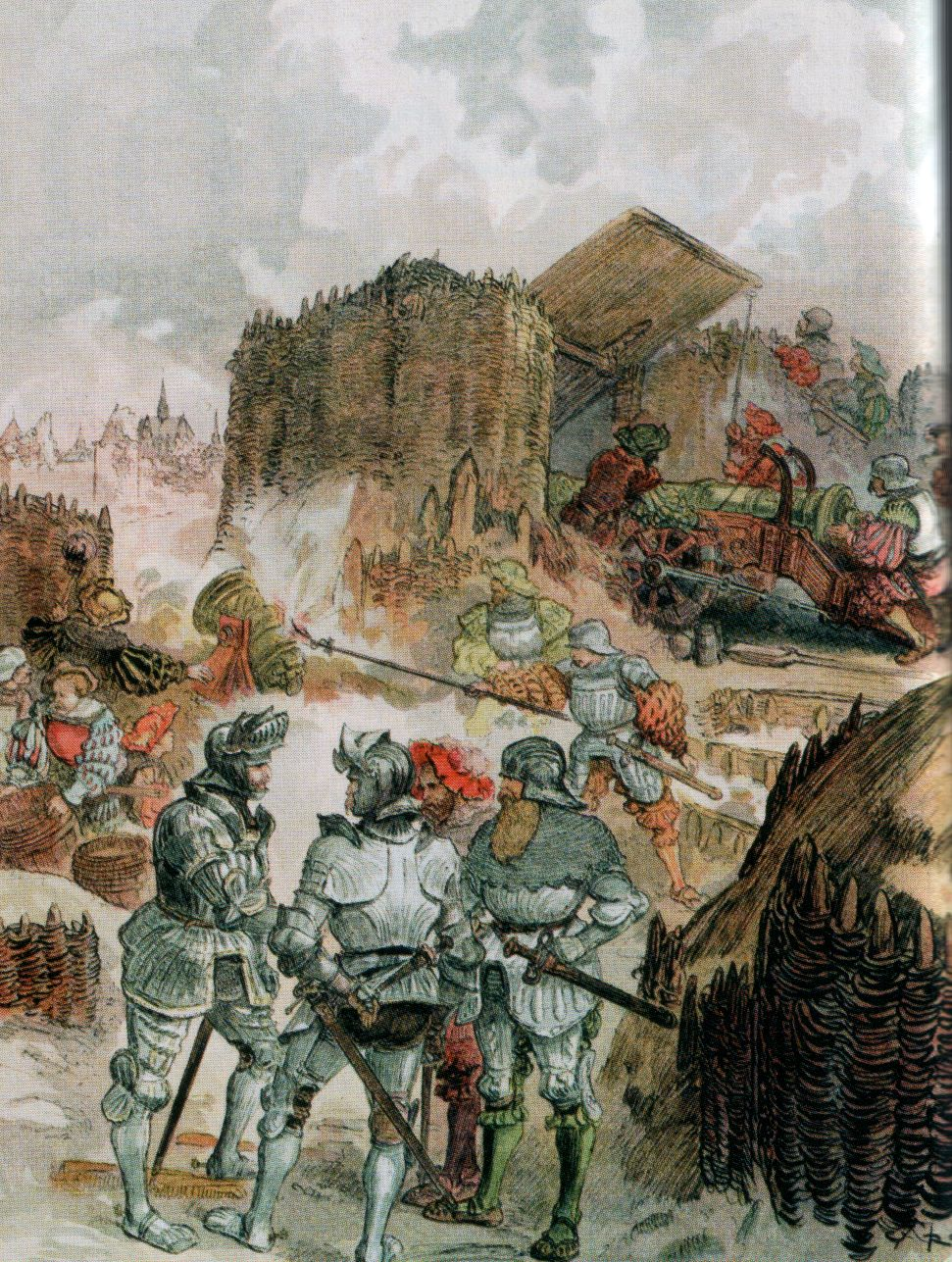
  Illustration of the siege of Mézières
- 23 November – Spanish–German–Papal forces under Prosper Colonna force French Marshal Odet de Lautrec to abandon Milan.

== Births ==
- 18 April – François de Coligny d'Andelot, French general (d. 1569)

=== Date Unknown ===
- Anne du Bourg, French magistrate and a Protestant martyr. (d.1559)
- Louis de La Trémoille, French nobleman and 1st Duke of Thouars (d.1577)
- Gilles de Gouberville, French diarist (d.1578)
- Rene Benoit(or Rene Benedict), French theologian and writer (d.1608)
- Louise de Brézé, French noblewoman .(d.1577)

== Deaths ==
- April 28 - Suzanne, French noblewomen, Duchess of Bourbon (b.1491)
