= 1527 in France =

- Decades: 1500s; 1510s; 1520s; 1530s; 1540s
- See also: History of France; Timeline of French history; List of years in France

Events from the year 1527 in France.

== Incumbents ==
- Monarch – Francis I

== Events ==
- August 16 - King Francis I meets with Cardinal Wolsey of England in Aimens to ratify the alliance between the two kingdoms. France and England soon declared war on the holy roman emperor Charles V.

== Births ==
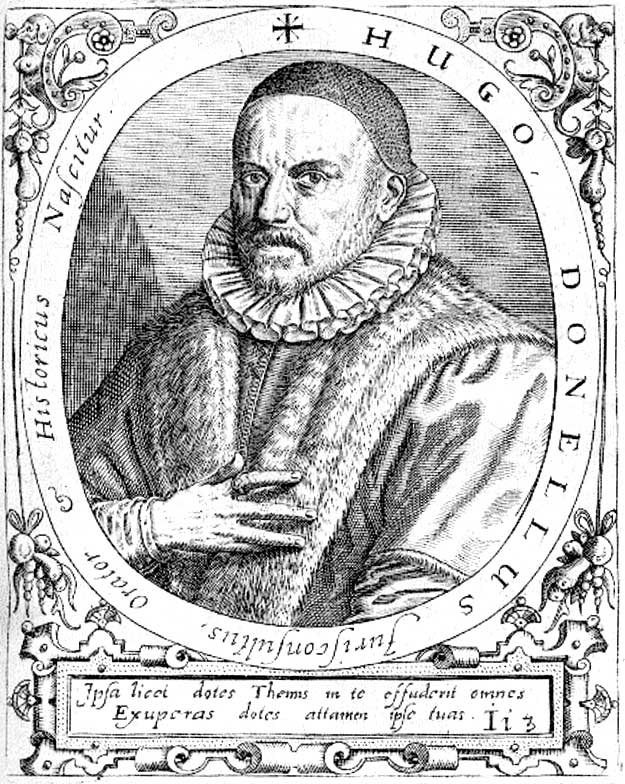
Hugues Doneau

- October 21 – Louis I, Cardinal of Guise, French cardinal (d.1578)
- December 23 – Hugues Doneau, law professor (d.1591).

=== Full date missing ===
- Louis Duret, physician
- Jean de Nogaret de La Valette, military officer (d.1575)
- Renaud de Beaune, clergyman (d.1606)

== Deaths ==
=== Full date missing ===
- Charles III, Duke of Bourbon, military officer (b. 1490)
- Jean Fleury, naval officer
