= Mercurino di Gattinara =

Italian politician (1465–1530)

His Eminence Mercurino di Gattinara
- Cardinal-Priest of San Giovanni a Porta Latina; Marquis of Gattinara
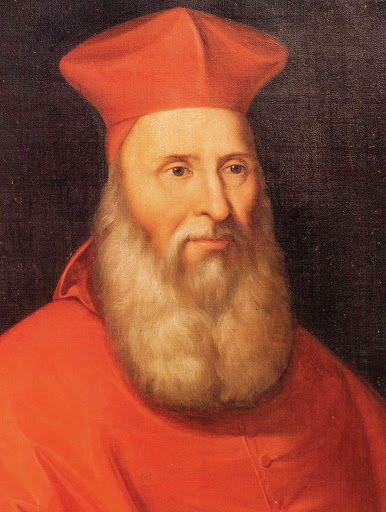
- Portrait of Cardinal Gattinara, 16th century
- Church: Catholic Church
- Appointed: 23 September 1529
- Term ended: 5 June 1530
- Predecessor: Giovanni Domenico de Cupis
- Successor: Gabriel de Gramont

Orders
- Created cardinal: 13 August 1529 by Pope Clement VII
- Rank: Cardinal-Priest

Personal details
- Born: 10 June 1465 Gattinara, Italy
- Died: 5 June 1530 (aged 64) Rome, Papal States
- Coat of arms

Mercurino Arborio, marchese di Gattinara (10 June 1465 – 5 June 1530), was an Italian statesman and jurist who served, from 1518 to 1530, as the principal chancellor of Charles V, the King of Spain and the Holy Roman Emperor. He was made cardinal of the Catholic Church for San Giovanni a Porta Latina in 1529. He is held as the prior of the humanists who called for the restoration of a universal, Christian Roman Empire.

== Biography ==
He was born in Gattinara, near Vercelli, modern Piedmont. Mercurino Gattinara initially served as the legal advisor to Margaret of Austria in Savoy. She considered him as chief amongst her various counsellors. He also served the young Duke Charles II of Burgundy, who became the King of Castile and Aragon in 1516. Upon the death of Jean le Sauvage, the Grand Chancellor of Burgundy in 1518, Gattinara was appointed to succeed him in the Burgundian office, also becoming the principal Chancellor of all of Charles' domains.

When his sovereign became the Holy Roman Emperor as Charles V in 1519, Gattinara gained additional influence, but he never held the office of the Imperial Archchancellor (German: Reichserzkanzler), an honorary post traditionally reserved for the Archbishops of Mainz.

Upon the death of Charles' counsellor Chièvres, Gattinara would become the king's most influential advisor, and also became known as the “Grand Chancellor of all the realms and kingdoms of the king”. He was a Catholic, humanist, Erasmian, jurist and scholar—at the same time idealist in his goals, and realist in his tactics. He was a scholar of jurisprudence, the classic theory of the state, and the Christian doctrine of duty. Gattinara would guide Charles away from both his roots in dynastic Burgundy, and from the prevailing secular political theory of Spain at the time, toward a Christian humanist conception of Empire. His ideas of the primacy of the Empire in Europe were in direct contradiction with the growing trend toward the theory of the nation state.

In his capacity as Chancellor, he urged Charles V to create a dynastic empire with the object of establishing global rule ("Dominium Mundi"). Gattinara in his policy advice and personal writings argued for Christian imperialism, based on a united Christendom, which would then combat or convert the Protestants, the Turks, and the infidels of the New World. His theory attempted to balance the solidarity of Christian nations, with the requirements of conquest for the establishment of one world empire.

Gattinara was instrumental in shifting Charles V's policy vision from that of a regional dynastic monarch to an empire-builder. Doubtless due in large part to Gattinara's counsel, the Habsburg Empire would reach its territorial height under Charles V, although it would begin to show signs of decay at the end of his reign, most importantly with the independence granted to the economically thriving but tax-averse Low Countries.

== Goals ==
After Charles's election to the throne, Gattinara wrote to him:

Sire, God has been very merciful to you: he has raised you above all the Kings and Princes of Christendom to a power such as no sovereign has enjoyed since your ancestor Charles the Great. He has set you on the way towards a world monarchy, towards the uniting of all Christendom under a single shepherd.

In the conclusion to this letter, Gattinara reiterated his belief that the true purpose of monarchy was to unite all people in the service of God.

During a review for the purpose of administrative reform, Gattinara advised Charles, in a section of the report entitled “Reverence toward God”, on issues such as: whether Moors and Infidels should be tolerated in his lands; whether the inhabitants of the West Indian islands and the mainland were to be converted to Christianity; and whether the Inquisition should be reformed.

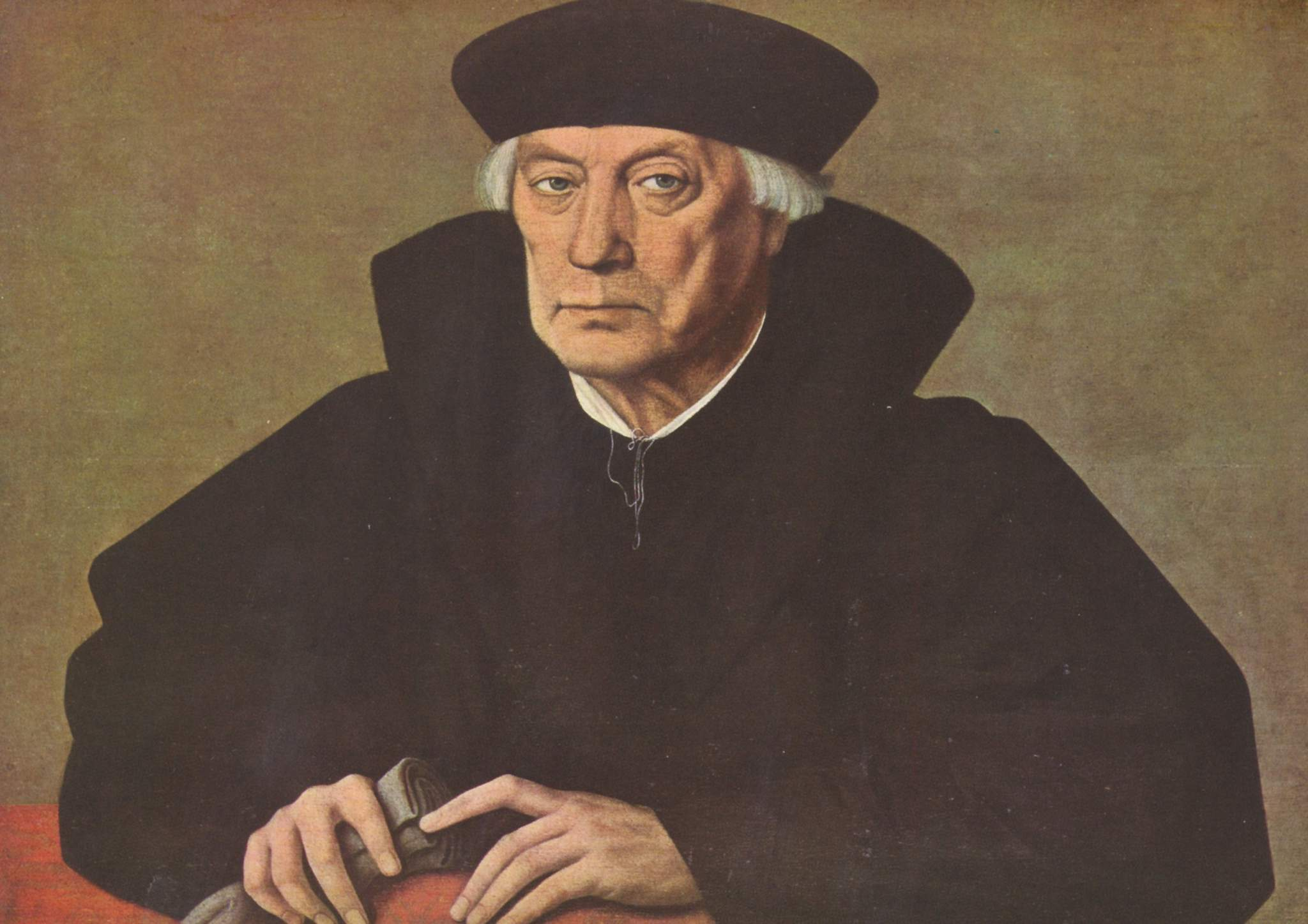
Possible portrait of Mercurino Gattinara, by Jan Cornelisz Vermeyen (c. 1530)

Another goal espoused by Gattinara was to unite Christendom against the Turk, as well as against the Lutheran heresy. There was little practical basis for achieving such an understanding between the European powers, however.

Gattinara's own summation of his views included the final goal of laying the foundations for a policy that was truly imperial, leading to a general war on the infidel and heretic. His first objective was the Emperor's voyage to Italy as soon as the fleet was ready. Gattinara concealed the reason for expanding the fleet by reference to the troubles in Mexico.

At every fresh opportunity, Gattinara was for “taking time by the forelock” and establishing the power of Charles V in Italy without more delay. This would function as a permanent guarantee of peace, not only on the peninsula but in all of Europe. Gattinara's views were rooted in Dante, despite having to face many practical setbacks. He faced deep-seated opposition to the imperial council, and Gattinara began to acknowledge that many were against his plan. Many Spaniards suspected Gattinara of having interests in Italy (as he was originally from Piedmont), so his motives were questioned, and he was even threatened.

Gattinara held Dante's dream of universal monarchy as the ultimate goal of Charles V's rule - uniting both Christendom and eventually the world. These ideas were in line with some of Charles's other advisors. Imperial ambassador at Henry VIII’s court, M. Louis de Praet, wrote to Charles:

At this moment one may say that Your Majesty holds world monarchy in your hands, provided this victory over France is turned to good advantage. If the English were to set foot in France, it would be a great advantage for Your Majesty, for it would weaken the enemy and prevent him from doing any further damage, and thus the surest means to a lasting peace. The whole of Languedoc, Burgundy, and the land about the River Somme should be regained. God made Emperor the arbitrator between peace and war. Such favourable opportunity should not be lost.

Charles’s secretary, Alfonso de Valdés, a humanist and Erasmian like Gattinara, would write to Charles after the victory of Pavia (a defeat for the French, including the capture of their king François I):

It appears God has bestowed this victory on the Emperor in a wonderful manner so that he might defend Christendom and fight the Turks and Moors on their own ground so that the whole world receive our Holy Faith under this Christian Prince and the words of Our Savior be fulfilled: Fiet unum ovile et unus pastor.

The Spanish missionary spirit is here wedded with Dante’s theocratic ideal and expresses the high expectations of the humanist Italians and Spaniards surrounding Charles. The Emperor was seen as the reviver of the Roman universal Monarchy who could put an end to the feudal and dynastic conflicts, and establish a democratic imperium. Charles' more limited goals of ordering his empire within a Respublica Christiana (a united Europe) was disappointing to his advisors seeking world dominion, especially so to Gattinara, the aspirant to “world-empire.”

== Policies ==
Just as Gattinara is noted for his universalist idealism, he is also recognized as adept in the practice of realpolitik.

Taking over from Charles V's advisor William de Croÿ, Gattinara shifted the policy outlook of his king. Chièvres had advocated protecting the Netherlands through understandings with France and England, attempting to avoid war with France especially. Gattinara aimed at broadening Charles from a narrow Burgundian/Spanish outlook toward a wide imperial vision. At the centre of his imperial policy was Italy: Milan was the vital link between the Habsburg holdings of Spain/Franche-Comté and Tyrol. By the last months of 1521, Gattinara had succeeded in shifting the war with France from Navarre to Italy. His imperial strategy had two conditions for success: domination of Italy, and alliance with Rome.

Gattinara was the source of Charles's shift in policy toward Italy—no other cabinet member pushed for these policies. A year previous to Gattinara's appointment, the English ambassador Tunstal had remarked on Gattinara's preoccupation with Italy. Gattinara had drawn up advance drafts of war plans against Italy, in which he stresses that since God called Charles to be the first prince of Christendom it was fitting that he turned his attention to Italy, saying that anyone who counselled Charles against pursuing Italy in lieu of interest elsewhere was prescribing the king's ruin, shame and blame. Gattinara emphasized the low cost of an Italian campaign, and the necessary troop mobilization necessary for overwhelming force.

In deciding whether or not to advise Charles V to go to war against France in northern Italy, Gattinara constructed an allegory posing the seven deadly sins against the Ten Commandments—seven causes for avoiding war, and ten arguments in favour. Against, the reasons were all quite practical: an attack would place a great stake on a single strategy with an uncertain method of solution; there was not enough money in the treasury; negotiations with other Italian states were uncertain; the Swiss might ally themselves with France, and the area would soon be fraught with danger from the impending winter. However, Gattinara argued that the war was justified by Charles V's bond to honour the Pope, whom he needed as an ally. Clearly, God was on Charles's side, and to let France escape a fight would be to tempt fate—he would not have the chance, as resources would not be mobilized so easily next time. Additionally, with the army mobilized, it would not look good to call it off at the eleventh hour. Gattinara saw to it that his ten commandments won out over the seven deadly sins.

Gattinara was not an idealist when it came to policy. The Treaty of Madrid was forced upon Francis I of France by Charles after Francis was captured. The treaty spoke in romantic hyperbole and ended with an oath for both rulers to undertake a crusade together. While François signed the treaty under duress, Gattinara refused to affix the imperial seal to the document, because of his sense of realpolitik. François would subsequently break the terms of the treaty, which had been to renounce claims in Italy, surrender Burgundy, and abandon suzerainty over Flanders and Artois.

== See also ==
- Erasmus
- Nicolas Perrenot de Granvelle

== Sources ==
- Alvarez, Manuel Fernandez. Charles V: Elected emperor and hereditary ruler. Thames and Hudson, London: 1975.
- Boone, Rebecca, Mercurino di Gattinara and the creation of the Spanish Empire, London, Vermont: Pickering & Chatto, 2014.
- Boone, Rebecca, «Empire and Medieval Simulacrum: A Political Project of Mercurino Arborio di Gattinara, Gran Chancellor of Charles V», in The Sixteenth Century Journal, 4 (2011), pp. 1027–1049.
- Callado Estela, Emilio (2022). Tiempos de reforma: Pensamiento y religión en la época de Carlos V. ESIC.
- Boone, Rebecca Ard. Mercurino di Gattinara and the Creation of the Spanish Empire. Pickering and Chatto, London: 2014.
- Brandi, Karl. trans. C.V. Wedgwood. The Emperor Charles V: The Growth and Destiny of a Man and of a World-Empire. Humanities Press, Atlantic Highlands, NJ: 1980.
- Gross, Lothar (1933). Die Geschichte der deutschen Reichshofkanzlei von 1559 bis 1806. Wien: Staatsarchiv.
- Headley, John M. The emperor and his chancellor: a study of the imperial chancellery under Gattinara. New York: Cambridge University Press, 1983.
- Parker, Geoffrey (2019). Emperor: A New Life of Charles V. New Haven and London: Yale University Press.
- Rivero Rodríguez, Manuel, Gattinara: Carlos V y el sueño del Imperio, Madrid: Sílex, 2005.
- Rivero Rodríguez, Manuel, «Memoria, escritura y Estado: la autobiografía de Mercurino Arborio di Gattinara, Gran canciller de Carlos V», en Martínez Millán, José (coord.), Carlos V y la quiebra del humanismo político en Europa (1530-1558), Madrid: Sociedad Estatal para la Conmemoración de los Centenarios de Felipe II y Carlos V, volumen 1, 2000, págs. 199–224.
- Rivero Rodríguez, Manuel, La Corona de Aragón, metáfora de la Monarquía de Carlos V: Gattinara y sus ideas sobre el gobierno (1519–1520), en García García, Bernardo José (coord.), El Imperio de Carlos V: procesos de agregación y conflictos, Madrid: Fundación Carlos de Amberes, 2000, págs. 97–110.
- Schwarzenfeld, Gertrude von. Charles V: Father of Europe. Hollis & Carter, London: 1957.
