= 1534 in France =

- Decades: 1510s; 1520s; 1530s; 1540s; 1550s
- See also: History of France; Timeline of French history; List of years in France

Events from the year 1534 in France.

== Incumbents ==
- Monarch – Francis I

== Events ==
- April 20 - French explorer Jacques Cartier embarked on a voyage seeking to find a passage to the East Indies.
- October 18 - Placards against Mass were posted by Protestants in Paris, Orléans and Amboise in what became known as Affair of the Placards.

== Births ==
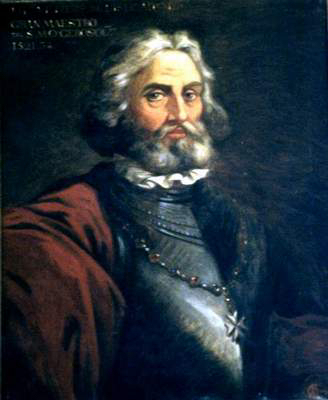
Philippe Villiers de L'Isle-Adam

- June 15 -Henri de Montmorency, 3rd Duke of Montmorency. (d.1614)
- October 18 – Jean Passerat, political satirist and poet (d. 1602)

=== Date Unknown ===
- Claude de La Baume, bishop and cardinal (d.1584)

== Deaths ==
- August 21 - Philippe Villiers de L'Isle-Adam, French soldier (b.1464)
- December 29 - Denis Poillot A French Knight.
