= 1522 in France =

- Decades: 1500s; 1510s; 1520s; 1530s; 1540s
- See also: History of France; Timeline of French history; List of years in France

Events from the year 1522 in France.

== Incumbents ==
- Monarch – Francis I

== Events ==
- February 28 – The Viscount of Lautrec, leader of the French Army, spares the Italian residents of Treviglio, apparently after witnessing a miracle of seeing a fresco of the Virgin Mary shed tears.
- April 27 – In the Battle of Bicocca, French and Swiss forces under Odet de Foix, Vicomte de Lautrec, the French governor of Milan are defeated by Prospero Colonna's combined Imperial and Papal army in their attempt to retake Milan.
- May 29 – England formally declares war on France.
- May 30 – France loses the siege of Genoa after 10 days against the Holy Roman Imperial armies of General Fernando d'Avalos.
- June 19 – Charles V, Holy Roman Emperor visits King Henry VIII of England, and signs the Treaty of Windsor, pledging a joint invasion of France, bringing England into the ongoing Italian War of 1521–1526.
- July 23 – A counter-attack by local peasants and the French Army defeats the English Army in the first Battle of Morlaix.

== Births ==
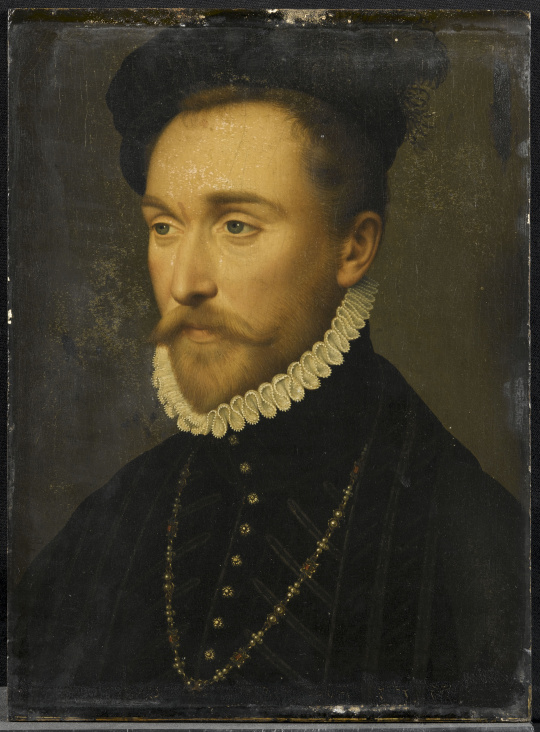
Marshal Albert de Gondi 1522-1602

- November 4 - Albert de Gondi, Marshal of France (d.1602)

=== Date Unknown ===
- Joachim du Bellay, Poet (d.1560)
- Jacques Cujas, Legal expert (d. 1590)

== Deaths ==
- October 30 – Jean Mouton, French composer (b. c. 1459)
- November 14 – Anne of France, Princess and Regent of France (b. 1461)
