= 1531 in France =

- Decades: 1510s; 1520s; 1530s; 1540s; 1550s
- See also: History of France; Timeline of French history; List of years in France

Events from the year 1531 in France.

== Incumbents ==
- Monarch – Francis I

== Events ==
- Bertrand d'Ornesan, leads an expedition to Brazil to establish a commercial post. The ship sailed from Normandy with 120 men.

== Births ==
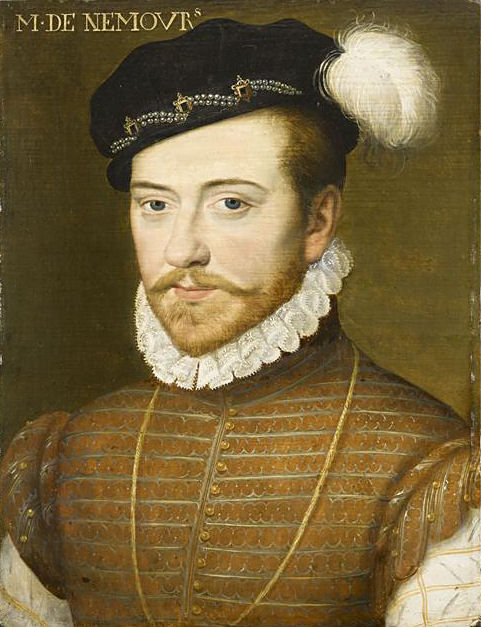
- Jacques de Savoie
  July 17 - Antoine de Créqui Canaples, French bishop and cardinal (d.1574)
- October 12 -Jacques de Savoie, Duke of Nemours, French Nobleman and military commander (d. 1585)
- November 16- Anna d'Este, French noblewoman, Duchess of Aumale, Nemours and Genevois (d.1607)

=== Date Unknown ===
- Barnabé Brisson, jurist and politician (d.1591)
- Petrus Morinus, biblical scholar (d.1608)

== Deaths ==
- May 14 -Guillaume de Montmorency, Baron de Montmorency and lord of Chantilly. (b.1453)
- September 22- Louise of Savoy, mother of King Francis I and Marguerite of Navarre. And queen regent in 1515, 1525–1526 and 1529, during the absence of her son.(b.1476)
