= 1529 in France =

- Decades: 1500s; 1510s; 1520s; 1530s; 1540s
- See also: History of France; Timeline of French history; List of years in France

Events from the year 1529 in France.

== Incumbents ==
- Monarch – Francis I

== Events ==
- June 21 - The French army is defeated at the Battle of Landriano in Italy, as part of the War of the League of Cognac.
- August 3 –The Treaty of Cambrai is signed between the Valois dynasty and the Habsburgs.

== Births ==
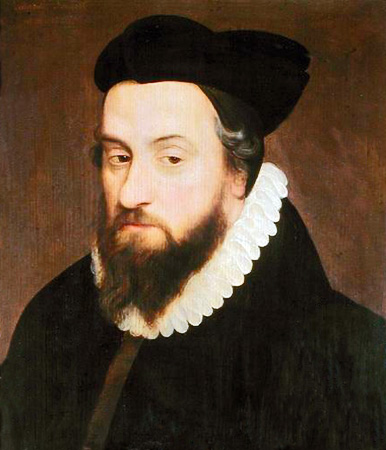
Laurent Joubert

- June 7 - Étienne Pasquier, French lawyer. (d. 1615)
- December 16 - Laurent Joubert of Montpellier, French Doctor and academic in medicine. (d.1582)

=== Date Unknown ===
- Pomponne de Bellièvre, French politician (d.1607)
- Guy Du Faur, Seigneur de Pibrac, French jurist and poet (b.1584)

== Deaths ==
- April 17 – Louis de Berquin, French lawyer and Protestant reformer who was burned at the stake as a heretic (b.1490)

=== Date Unknown ===
- Guillaume de Marcillat, French painter and stained glass artist (d.1470)
- Jean Parmentier, French navigator, cartographer, and poet (d.1494)
