= 1514 in France =

- Decades: 1490s; 1500s; 1510s; 1520s; 1530s
- See also: History of France; Timeline of French history; List of years in France

Events from the year 1514 in France.

== Incumbents ==
- Monarch – Louis XII

== Events ==
- 3 October – The Earl of Worcester reports from Abbeville on King Louis XII's preparations for Mary Tudor's arrival.
- 9 October – Louis XII marries Mary Tudor (sister of King Henry VIII) at Abbeville, as part of the English peace with France.
- 5 November – Mary Tudor is crowned Queen of France by the Bishop of Bayeux at the Abbey Church of Saint-Denis.

== Births ==
- Philibert de l’Orme, architect and writer

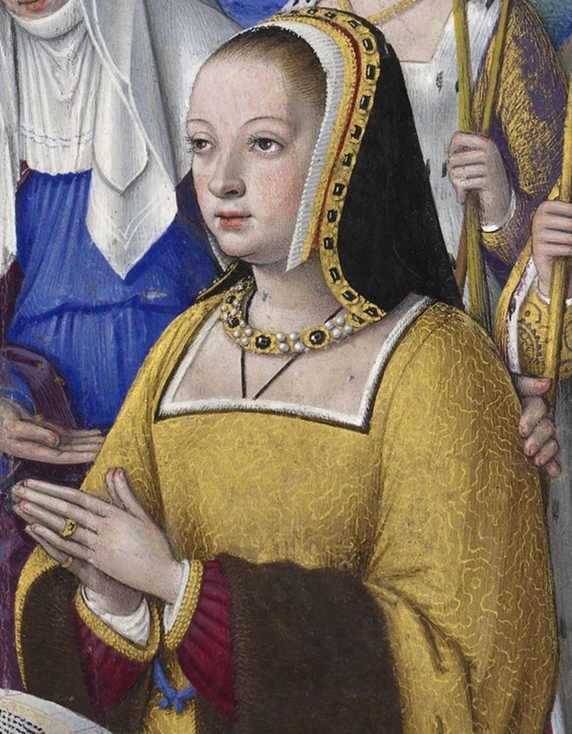
Anne of Brittany

== Deaths ==
- January 9 – Anne of Brittany, Duchess of Brittany (b. 1477).

=== Date Unknown ===
- Guillaume Briçonnet, cardinal and statesman (b.1445)
- Pierre Desrey, chronicler, historian, genealogist and translator (b. 1450)
