= Vindiciae contra tyrannos =

Influential Huguenot tract published in Basel in 1579

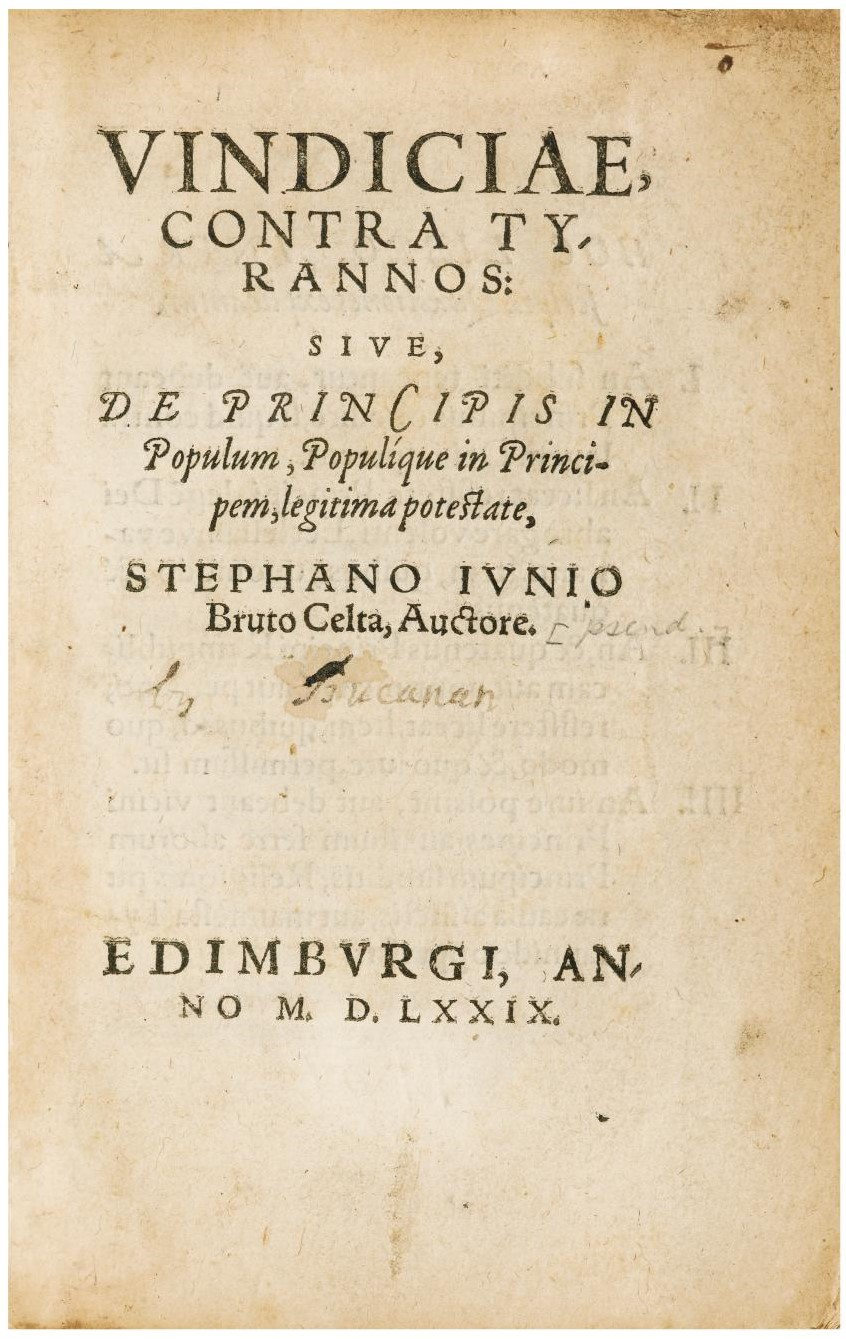
Vindiciae contra tyrannos

Vindiciae contra tyrannos (meaning: "Defences [of liberty] against tyrants") was an influential Huguenot tract published in Basel in 1579. Its author remains uncertain, since it was written under the pseudonym of "Stephen Junius Brutus". Likely candidates for its authorship include Hubert Languet and Philippe de Mornay. In 1931, Gerardina Tjaberta van Ysselsteyn conjectured that the tract was a collaboration between Languet and de Mornay.

The work proceeds through four questions concerning the response of the people to their king. The first two questions are treated briskly and concern whether a people are bound to obey or are able to resist their king when he breaks the divine law. The third and longest question considers whether the people can resist a king on the grounds that he is destroying the commonwealth.

The answer to each of these questions is an affirmative. The work is interesting for the grounds that it gives a justification for popular resistance. The work merges the theological view of covenant with the legal understanding of contract to show why resistance can be justified in the eyes of the law. However, it stops short of inviting any individual to judge a king. Rather, individuals could only take up arms if they are led by an inferior magistrate (so termed to distinguish them from the superior magistrate, i.e., the king). This shows considerable restraint in the wake of the St. Bartholomew's Day massacre and in comparison to other Reformed thinkers such as Christopher Goodman and John Knox.

The fourth question considers whether foreign princes can legally support a popular rising against a king on the conditions set out in the first three questions.

Scholars have debated the extent to which the tract was influential to Roman and canon law.
