= 1535 in France =

- Decades: 1510s; 1520s; 1530s; 1540s; 1550s
- See also: History of France; Timeline of French history; List of years in France

Events from the year 1535 in France.

== Incumbents ==
- Monarch – Francis I

== Events ==
- January 13 – A statute of the Parlement of Paris is enacted forbidding all printing under threat of hanging and closing all bookshops, although it is quickly abandoned.
- January 21 – King Francis I organized a procession in Paris as a show of religious devotion, displaying holy relics such as the Crown of thorns and giving a speech declaring his faith that has come into question due to some of his alliances.
- May 19 – Explorer Jacques Cartier sets sail for his second voyage to North America with three ships, 110 men and Chief Donnacona's two sons (taken by Cartier during his first voyage).

== Births ==
- February 24 – Eléanor de Roye, noblewoman (d.1564)

=== Date Unknown ===
- Nicolas Rapin, magistrate, royal officer, translator, poet and satirist (d.1608)
- Isabelle de Limeuil, noblewoman (d.1609)

== Deaths ==
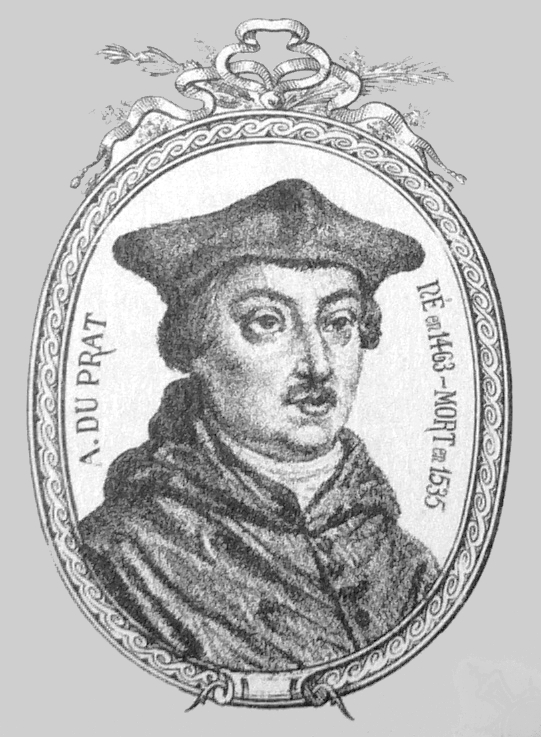
Antoine Duprat

- April 22 – Louis de Gorrevod, clergyman (b. c.1473)

=== Date Unknown ===
- Antoine Duprat, cardinal and politician (b. 1463).
- Jodocus Badius, printing pioneer (b. 1462)
