= 1528 in France =

- Decades: 1500s; 1510s; 1520s; 1530s; 1540s
- See also: History of France; Timeline of French history; List of years in France

Events from the year 1528 in France.

== Incumbents ==
- Monarch – Francis I

== Events ==
- March 28 – King Francis I accepts the challenge to a duel issued by Holy Roman emperor Charles V.
- April - August – Siege of Naples is carried out by French tropes led by Odet de Foix, the siege ended when a plague of Cholera swept through the French army, killing Odet de Foix and reducing the army by two-thirds .
- September12 – Andrea Doria defeats his former allies, the French, and establishes the independence of Genoa.
- Rebuilding the Chateau Fontainebleau in France is begun.

== Births ==
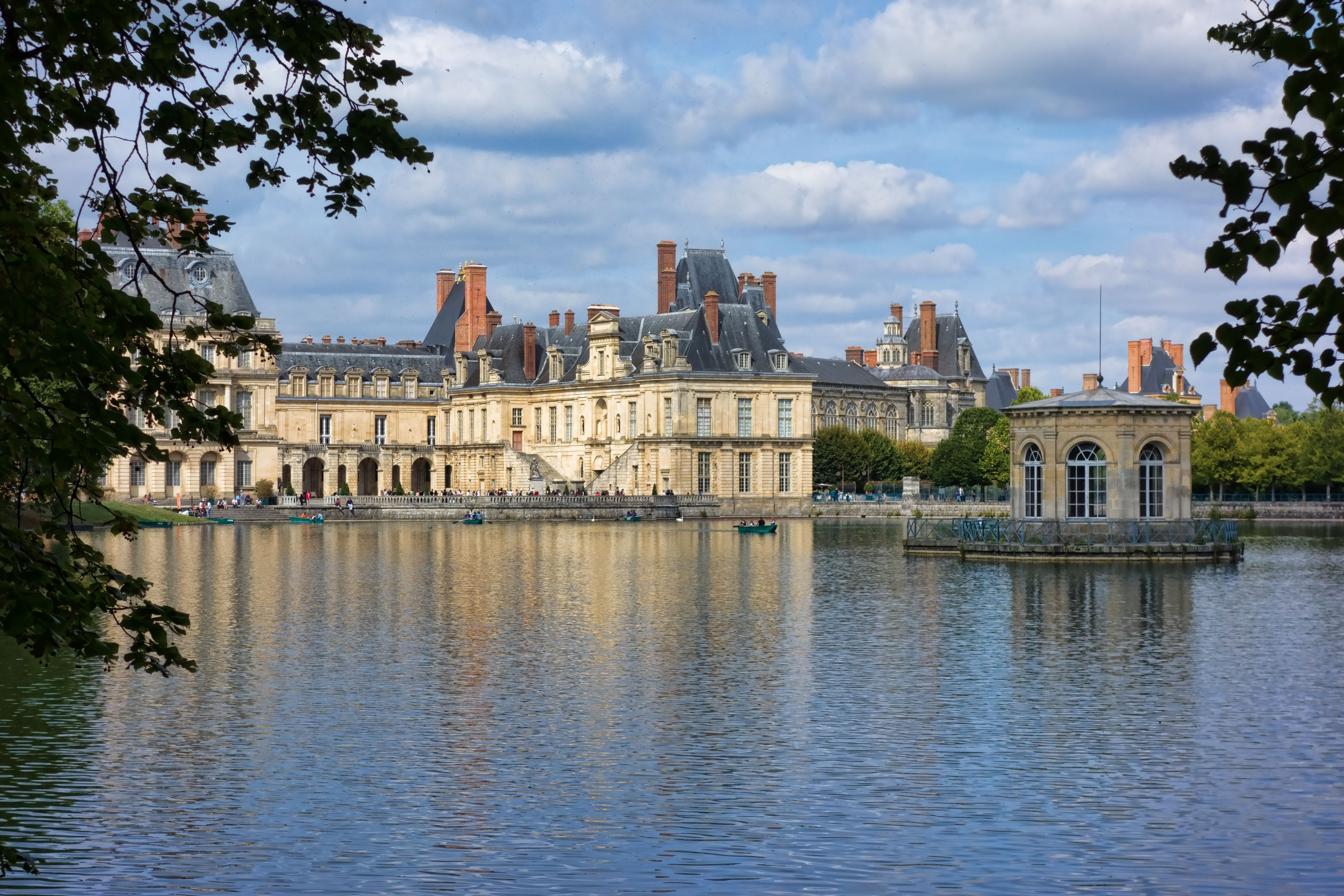
Chateau Fontainebleau

- November 16 –Jeanne d'Albret, Queen of Navarre (d. 1572)
- Jean-Jacques Boissard, French antiquary and Latin poet (d. 1602)
- probable
  - Paul de Foix French diplomat

== Deaths ==
- August 15 – Odet de Foix, Vicomte de Lautrec, French military leader (b. 1485)
