= 1520 in France =

- Decades: 1500s; 1510s; 1520s; 1530s; 1540s
- See also: History of France; Timeline of French history; List of years in France

Events from the year 1520 in France.

== Incumbents ==
- Monarch – Francis I

== Events ==
- June 7 – A meeting between King Henry VIII of England and King Francis I of France was held in Calais and lasted eighteen days, until June 24. This event is known as the Field of Cloth of Gold.

== Births ==
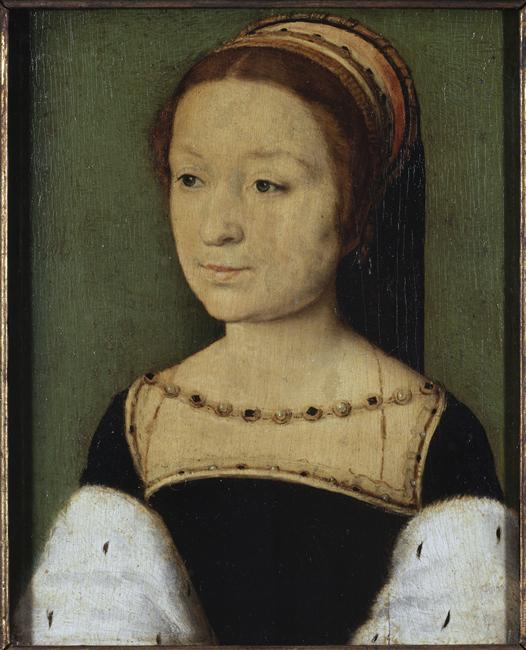
Madeleine of Valois 1520-1537

- January 1 – François Baudouin, French jurist, Christian controversialist and historian (d. 1573).
- August 10 – Madeleine of Valois, third daughter of King Francis I and Queen of Scotland (d. 1537).

== Deaths ==
- Henri Estienne, Parisian printer (b. 1460 or 1470).
