= 1516 in France =

- Decades: 1490s; 1500s; 1510s; 1520s; 1530s
- See also: History of France; Timeline of French history; List of years in France

Events from the year 1516 in France.

== Incumbents ==
- Monarch – Francis I

== Events ==
- August 13 – The Treaty of Noyon is signed. Francis I of France recognizes Charles I of Spain's claim to Naples, and Charles recognizes Francis's claim to Milan.
- August 18 - King Francis I of France and Pope Leo X sign the Concordat of Bologna, agreeing relationships between church and state in France.
- December 4 – Treaty of Brussels: Peace is declared between the Kingdom of France and the Holy Roman Empire.

== Births ==
- October 23 – Charlotte of Valois, French princess (d. 1524)
