= Jean Frangipani =

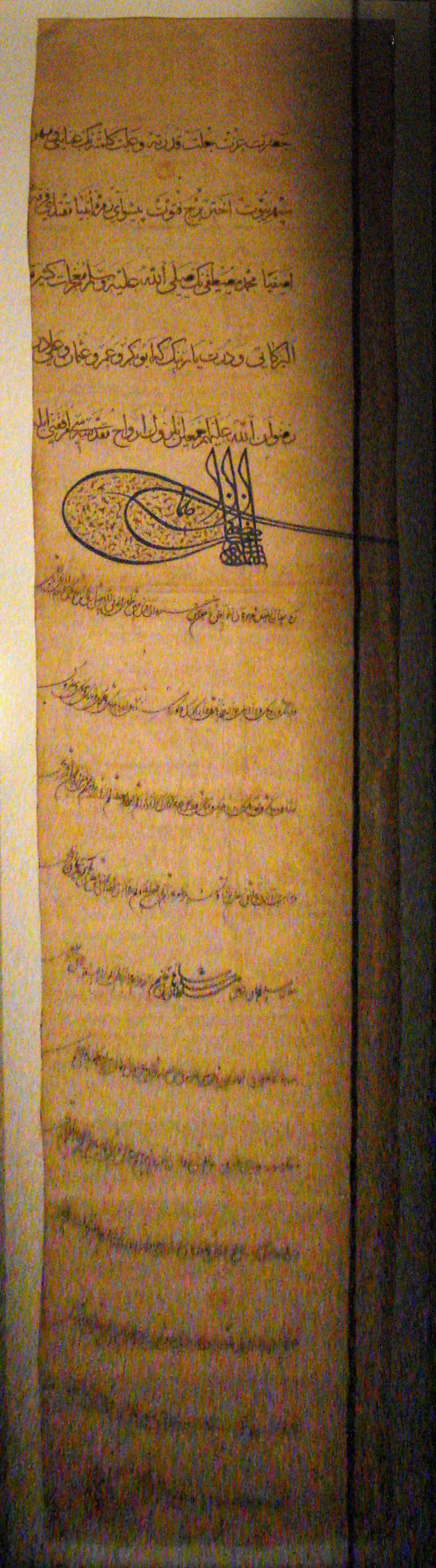
First letter from Suleiman to Francis I in February 1526, brought back by Jean Frangipani.

The Croat noble called by the French Jean Frangipani was sent by the agents of Francis I of France as ambassador to the Sublime Porte, following the Battle of Pavia (February 1525) which had been a disaster for the French. With the King of France imprisoned in Madrid, Frangipani was commissioned to carry an official letter encouraging Suleiman the Magnificent to attack the Emperor Charles V. The response he received was the opening of the long-standing Franco-Ottoman alliance. Francis's return letter was carried by another.

Though François-Emmanuel Guignard comte de Saint-Priest and Charles Henri Auguste Schefer set Jean Frangipani at the head of their exhaustive list of French ambassadors and ministers at the Ottoman court under the Ancien Régime, they admit that nothing is known of his figure save that he found himself in Hungary with the Ottoman forces at the time of Pavia. Jean Frangipani's relation to the medieval Frangipani nobles of Rome is unknown.

== See also ==
- Frankopan
