= Amadis Jamyn =

French poet (1540–1593)

Amadis Jamyn (1540 – 1593) was a French poet, a friend of Ronsard.

Born in Chaource near Troyes, he is known mostly for his love poems, but was also a good Greek scholar (he translated Homer).

== Main works ==
Oeuvre Poétiques:

- Dialogue
- Elégie
- Épitaphe
- Stances de l'impossible
