= Edmond Auger =

French Jesuit priest

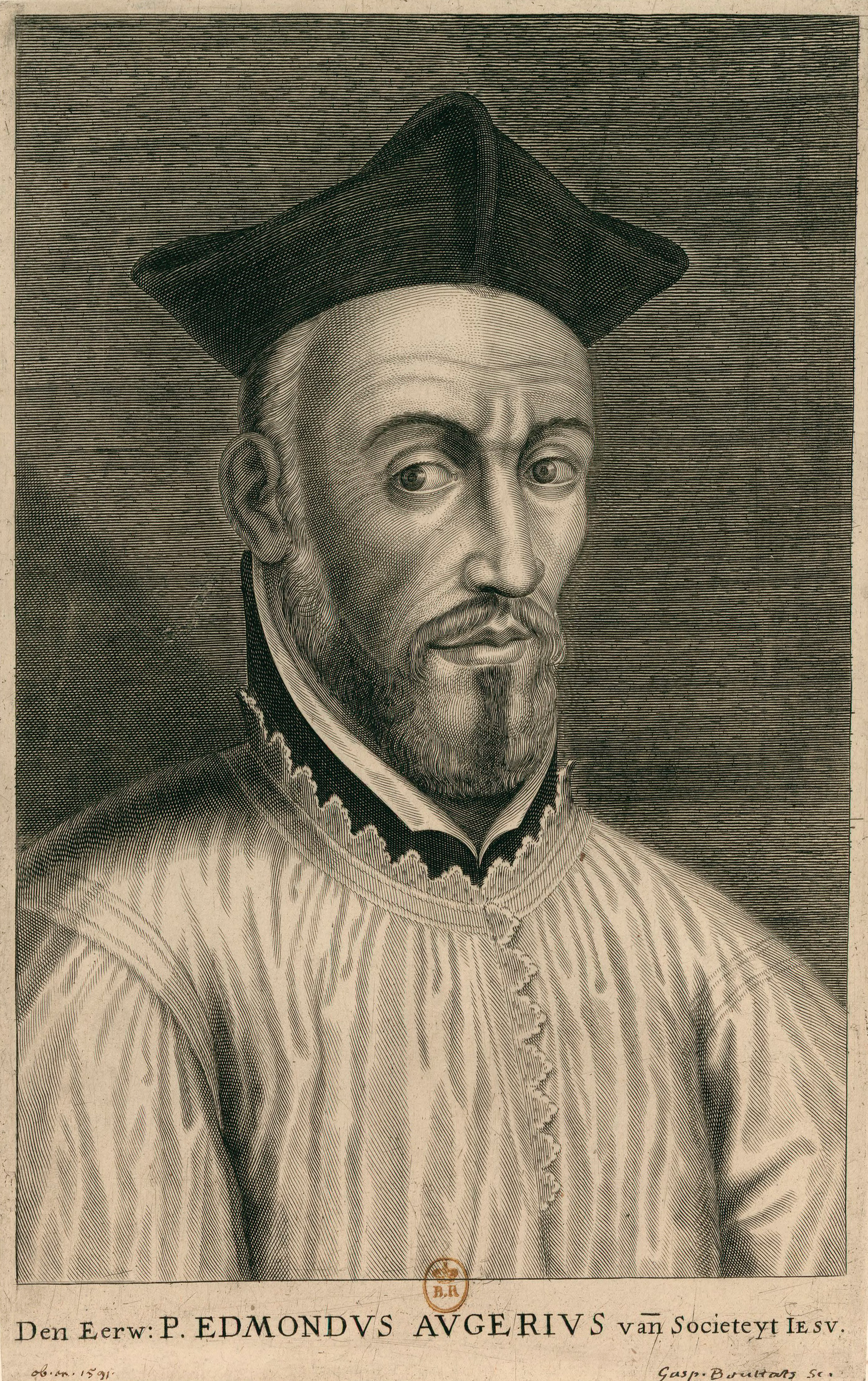

Personal life
- Born: 1530 Troyes, France
- Died: 10 January 1591 (aged 60–61) Como, Italy

Religious life
- Religion: Catholic
- Order: Society of Jesus

Edmond Auger (French: Émond Auger) (1530 – 19 January 1591), was a French Jesuit priest and confessor of Henry III of France.

== Life ==
Born to a peasant family near Troyes, Auger entered the Society of Jesus and was personally mentored by Ignatius of Loyola. He became widely known for his sermons, which drew crowds of thousands; contemporaries such as Étienne Pasquier praised his eloquence and called him the "French Chrysostom". In 1565, Auger became provincial superior of Aquitaine; by 1568, he won the favor of the politically active Charles, Cardinal of Lorraine, who introduced him at the royal court.

Auger was the chaplain to the Papal troops at the 1569 Battles of Jarnac and Moncontour. A proponent of just war theory, he opposed the Peace of Longjumeau and subsequent Peace of Saint-Germain-en-Laye, preaching against peace with the Huguenots. In 1572, Auger gave a sermon in Bordeaux describing the St. Bartholomew's Day Massacre in Paris and Orléans as an angelic execution of divine judgement; he claimed that the judgement would continue in Bordeaux, a prediction borne out by the massacre there several days later.

In 1575, Auger became the personal confessor of Henry III, despite the opposition of Henry's mother Catherine de' Medici, who disapproved of Auger's pro-war stance and inflammatory rhetoric. Over the years that followed, Catherine became increasingly concerned by Auger's influence on the intensity of her son's devotional practices, fearing that he was prioritizing them over his duties as king. The Society of Jesus and the Catholic League came to share in her concerns, eventually resulting in Auger's 1587 expulsion from the court. Auger withdrew to Como, Italy, where he died in 1591.

== Works ==
- Catéchisme et sommaire de la religion chrestienne (1563), the first French-language Tridentine Catechism
- Le Pédagogue d’armes (1568), a treatise on warfare
- Histoire des choses memorables sur le faict de la religion chrestienne (1571), a translation of a Latin work by Jean-Pierre Maffeo
- Bref discours sur la mort de feu monsieur le cardinal de Lorraine (1574), a eulogy for Charles, Cardinal of Lorraine
- Metanoeologie (1584)

Throughout the 1570s and 1580s, Auger was involved with the founding and promotion of a number of confraternities. He wrote statutes for two of these orders: the confraternity of penitents of St. Jerome of Toulouse, and the Congrégation de l’Annonciation Notre-Dame, the latter sponsored by Henry III.
