= List of chancellors of Burgundy =

List of chancellors of Burgundy, as found in the Trophées tant sacrées que profanes du Duché de Brabant by Christophe Butkens.

The chancellor was one of the most powerful leaders of Burgundy.

Begin	End	Name
1160	1163	Étienne
1385	1405	Jean Canard
1405	1419	Jean de Saulx
1419	1422	Jean de Thoisy
1422	1462	Nicolas Rolin
1462	1465	Vacant
1465	1471	Pierre de Goux
1471	1477	William Hugonet, Lord of Saillant
1477	1480	Vacant
1480	1496	John I Carondelet
1496	1506	Thomas de Plaine, Lord of Gouhenans
1506	1515	Vacant
1515	1518	Jean Le Sauvage
1518	1530	Mercure Alborio, Count of Gattinara
