= Jean Sauvage =

Grand Chancellor of Burgundy from 1515 - 1518

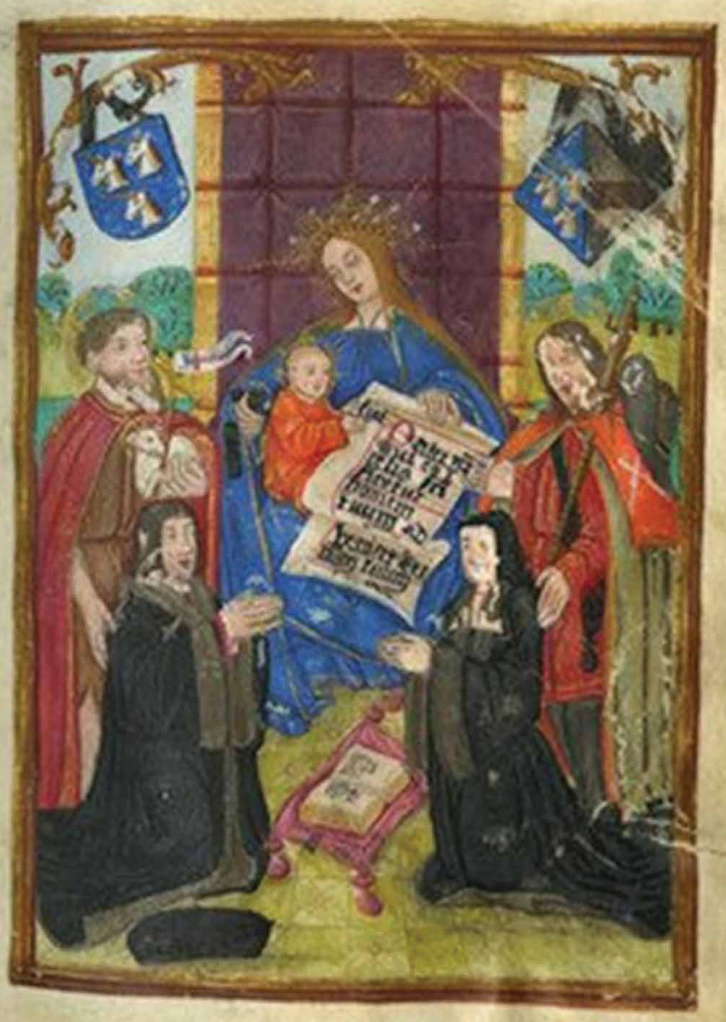
Jean Le Sauvage and his wife Jacqueline de Boulogne, 1503, Miniature by Jean Markant

Jean Sauvage, also known as Jean le Sauvage (1455 – 7 June 1518) was the Grand Chancellor of Burgundy from 1515 to 1518, during the rule of Duke Charles II who later became the Holy Roman Emperor (1519). When Charles became the King of Castile and Aragon in 1516, Sauvage accompanied his sovereign to Spain in 1517, where he was invested with additional duties, thus becoming the principal Chancellor of all of Charles' realms.

== Biography ==
Sauvage was born in Lille. He studied law at the University of Louvain. In 1490 he was made a member of the Council of Flanders and its president in 1497. He was made Chancellor of Brabant in 1509. His rise to office occurred with the support of William de Croÿ. In 1515 Sauvage became Grand Chancellor of Burgundy. In 1517 he was made the principal Chancellor of all of Charles' realms.

During all this time, Sauvage exerted a strong influence on the education of the young prince and future Emperor Charles V. At his inauguration as monarch of Castile in 1517, the young Charles arrived in Valladolid with his Flemish courtiers, among whom Grand chancellor Le Sauvage stood out.
Upon their arrival, the mistrust of the Castilian elite awaited them, fearful that the government of the Court would come in the hands of foreigners. When the Cortes of Valladolid was opened on 2 February 1518, Charles appointed Jean le Sauvage as its president. This led to the expected animosity of the Castilian attorneys, who refused to meet under Sauvage's presidency.
Finally, Charles was forced to give in to the protests, replacing Sauvage with Spanish Bishop Pedro Ruiz de la Mota.

A few months later, in June 1518, during Charles's stay in Zaragoza, Sauvage died from the plague that was raging in the Kingdom at the same time. This allowed Mercurino di Gattinara to rise to the political scene.

== Sources ==
- Parker, Geoffrey (2019). Emperor: A New Life of Charles V. New Haven and London: Yale University Press.
- Harold Livermore. A History of Spain. New York: Grove Press, 1958. p. 208.
- Peter G. Bietenholz and Thomas Brian Deutscher. Contemporaries of Erasmus: A Biographical Register of the Renasaince and Reformation. Toronto: University of Toronto Press, 2003. p. 325-326.

Government offices
Preceded by Thomas de Plaine, Lord of Maigny	Grand Chancellor of Burgundy; 1515–1518	Succeeded by Mercure Alborio, Count of Gattinara
