= Hubert Languet =

French diplomat and reformer

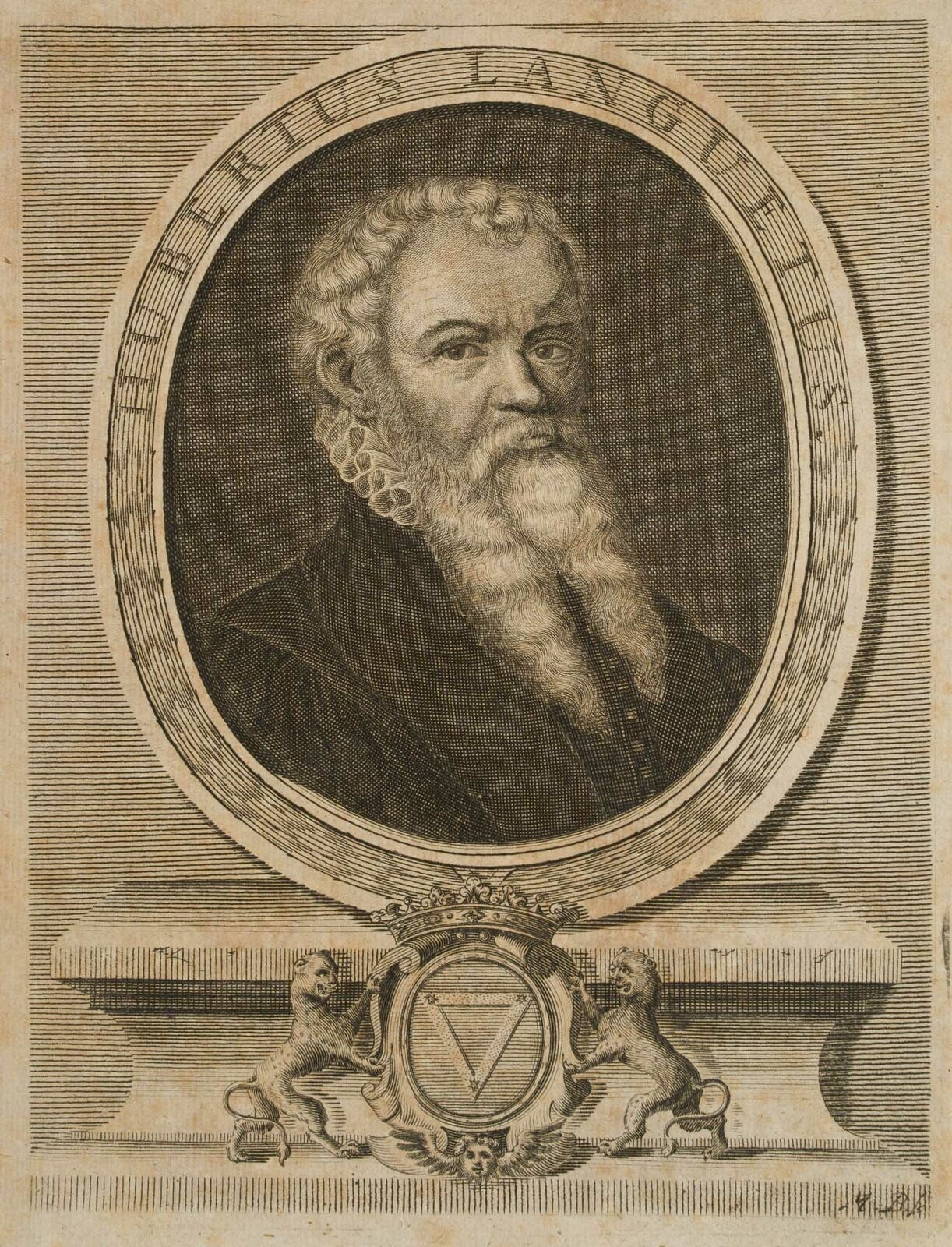
Hubert Languet

Hubert Languet (1518 – 30 September 1581, in Antwerp) was a French diplomat and reformer. The leading idea of his diplomacy was that of religious and civil liberty for the protection and expansion of Protestantism. He did everything in his power to advance the union of the Protestant churches.

== Life ==
Languet was born in 1518 in Vitteaux, France, located 21 miles (34 km) west of Dijon, France.

He entered the University of Poitiers in order to study law but he was interested also in theology, history, and science and political science. He visited the universities of Padua and Bologna, and traveled in Italy and Spain.

Languet was greatly influenced by Melanchthon's Loci theologici, which put an end to his doubts. In 1549 Languet went to Wittenberg, where he was kindly received by Melanchthon as a guest, frequently accompanying him on his travels and being on intimate terms with his friends. Expelled from France by the persecutions of the Protestants, he settled at Wittenberg, spending the winters there, but making extensive journeys in the summer and autumn.

In 1559 Languet, on the recommendation of Melanchthon, entered the service of the elector of Saxony as diplomatic agent, which position he held until 1577. The elector sent him to various courts: to Paris, Vienna, Prague, Frankfurt, Cologne, and the Netherlands.

As a friend of Melanchthon he opposed the growing party of strict Lutherans; but still he did everything in his power to reconcile the opposing parties, even trying to effect the recognition of the French Huguenots at the diet of Frankfurt in 1562, but without success. In May 1561, Languet went to France in order to bring about a closer connection between the German princes and the French Protestants, and was present at the Religious Conference of Poissy. In 1562 Languet was in Antwerp; the following years were spent in diplomatic journeys to France and back to Saxony.

In 1571 the elector sent Languet together with the ambassadors of other Protestant princes of Germany to King Charles IX of France to congratulate him on the Peace of Saint Germain. On this occasion Languet advocated the equal recognition of both confessions, but the answer was the St Bartholomew's Day massacre; having narrowly escaped death, he left France in October 1572, and returned there only once more, shortly before his death.

From 1573 to 1576 Languet was at the court of Emperor Maximilian II, whom he accompanied on his various journeys. With the death of Maximilian II in 1576 his connection with the court of Vienna was dissolved. The bitter feelings against him as the friend of Melanchthon and a Calvinist caused him to ask for dismissal from the court. The elector granted his desire, but continued his salary. In 1577 he went to Cologne in order to be nearer to the Netherlands, as he was greatly attracted by William of Orange.

== Works ==
Hubert Languet is one possible candidate for the authorship of the influential Huguenot pamphlet, Vindiciae contra tyrannos (1579). The book is divided into four parts each of which proposes and answers a question:

1. Must God in a case of dispute be obeyed rather than a ruler?
2. May a ruler who violates the law of God and devastates the Church, be opposed?
3. How far, and with what right may it be allowed to oppose a ruler who suppresses or destroys the state?
4. Have neighboring rulers a right to assist the subjects oppressed by his ruler?
