= 1566 in France =

- Decades: 1540s; 1550s; 1560s; 1570s; 1580s
- See also: History of France; Timeline of French history; List of years in France

Events from the year 1566 in France.

== Incumbents ==
- Monarch – Charles IX of France

== Events ==
- Ordonnance of Moulins prohibits writing, printing or selling of defamatory books and requires all books published to carry a seal of state approval.

== Births ==
- February 1 – Marie of the Incarnation, Discalced Carmelite beatified nun and blessed (d. 1618)
- November 3 – Charles, Count of Soissons, prince du sang and military commander (d. 1612)
- date unknown
  - Claude Dausque, Jesuit (d. 1644)
  - Françoise de Montmorency-Fosseux, mistress of King Henry III of Navarre (d. 1614)
  - Claude de La Trémoille, nobleman (d. 1604)

== Deaths ==
- April 25
  - Diane de Poitiers, Noblewoman and mistress of King Henry II of France (b.1500)
  - Louise Labé, poet (b. c. 1524)
- April 29 – Jean Suau, French Roman Catholic bishop and cardinal (b.1503)
- July 2 – Nostradamus, astrologer (b. 1503)
- July 30 – Guillaume Rondelet, doctor (b. 1507)

=== date unknown ===
- Charles Dumoulin, jurist (b. 1500)
