= 1564 in France =

- Decades: 1540s; 1550s; 1560s; 1570s; 1580s
- See also: History of France; Timeline of French history; List of years in France

Events from the year 1564 in France.

== Incumbents ==
- Monarch – Charles IX

== Events ==
- 22 June – French settlers abandon Charlesfort, the first French attempt at colonizing the modern-day United States, and establish Fort Caroline in Florida
- Edict of Roussillon

== Births ==
- 7 March – Pierre Coton, Jesuit (died 1626)
- 24 November – Joseph Gaultier de la Vallette, astronomer (died 1647)

=== Full date missing ===
- Jean D'Espagnet, polymath: lawyer, politician, mathematician, alchemist, antiquarian and poet (died c.1637)

== Deaths ==
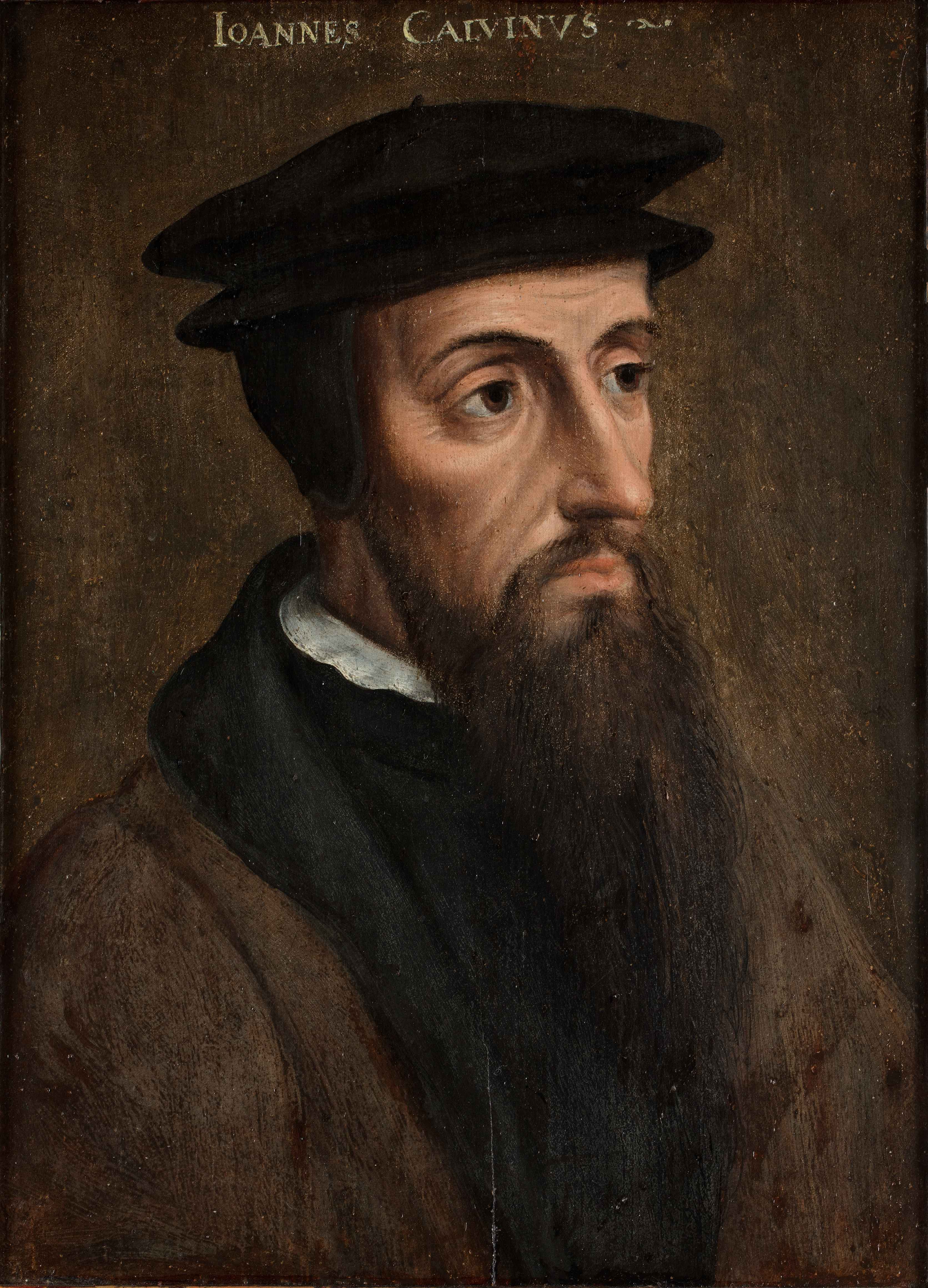
John Calvin

- 19 February – Guillaume Morel, scholar (born 1505)
- April – Pierre Belon, explorer (born 1517)
- 27 May – John Calvin, theologian, principal developer of the system later called Calvinism (born 1509)

=== Full date missing ===
- Jean de Tournes, printer, book publisher and bookseller (born 1504)
- Philibert Jambe de Fer, composer (fl. 1548)
- Jacques Brunel, organist and composer
- Jourdan des Ursins, Corsican military officer (born 1500)
- Masseot Abaquesne, faience manufacturer (born c.1500)
- Pierre de Bocosel de Chastelard, poet (b.1540)
