= 1558 in France =

- Decades: 1530s; 1540s; 1550s; 1560s; 1570s
- See also: History of France; Timeline of French history; List of years in France

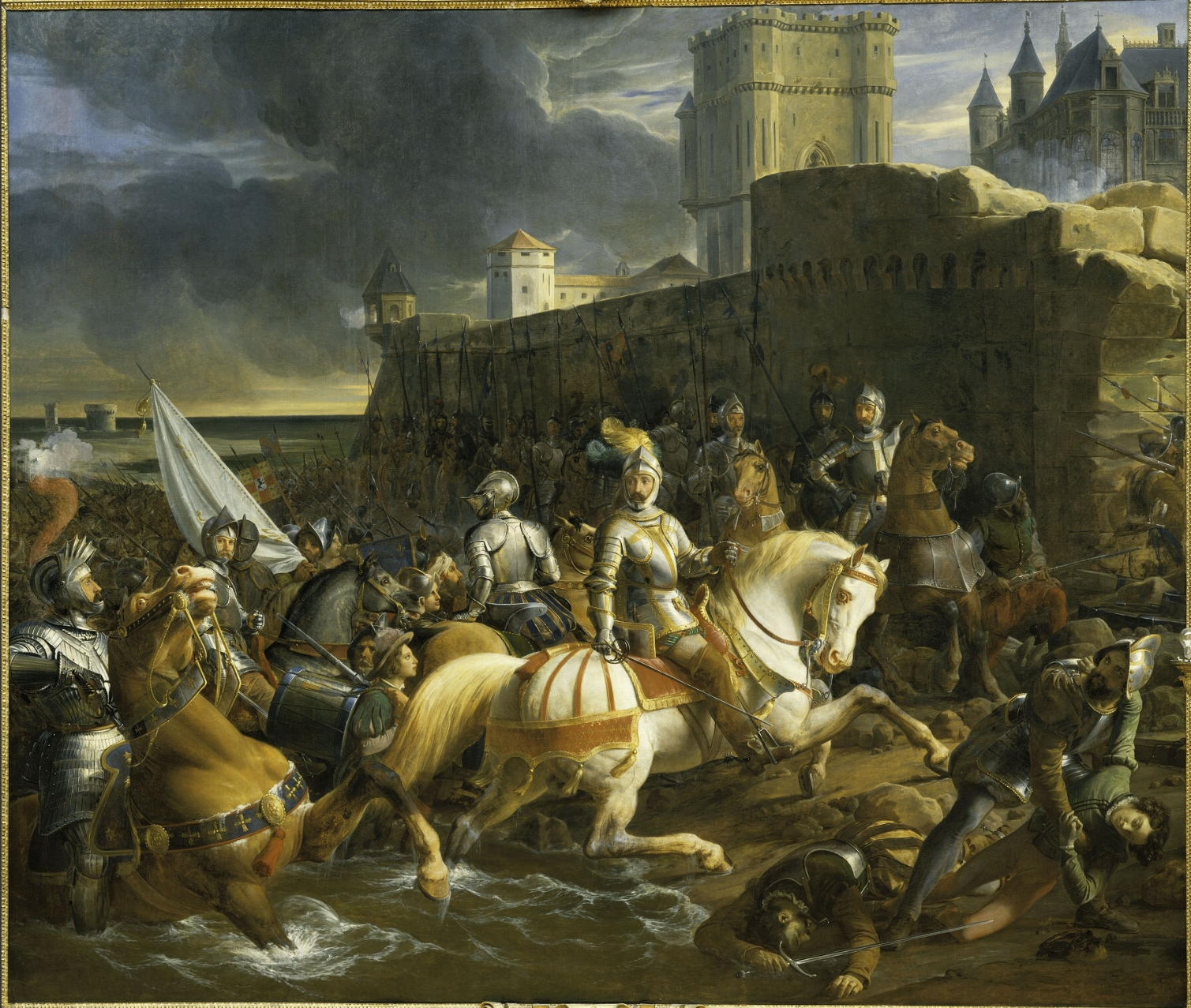
The siege of Calais

Events from the year 1558 in France.

== Incumbents ==
- Monarch – Henry II

== Events ==
- 1 to 8 January – The siege of Calais by the French army led by François, Duke of Guise, which ended with the capture of the English city.
- 17 April to 23 July – The siege of Thionville
- 13 July – The Battle of Gravelines

== Births ==
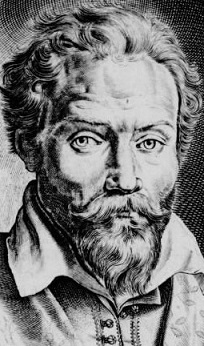
André du Laurens

- 9 September – Philippe Emmanuel, Duke of Mercœur, soldier and prominent member of the Catholic League (died 1602).
- 8 December – François de La Rochefoucauld, Cardinal (died 1645)
- 9 December – André du Laurens, physician (died 1609)
- 30 December – Jacques-Nompar de Caumont, duc de La Force, a marshal of France and peer of France (died 1652)

=== Full date missing ===
- Françoise de Cezelli, war hero during the French Wars of Religion (died 1615)
- Cardin Le Bret, jurist (died 1655)
- Fronton du Duc, Jesuit theologian (died 1624)
- Guillaume de Steenhuys, noble magistrate and diplomat (died 1638)

== Deaths ==
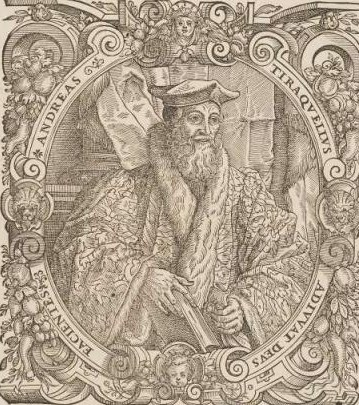
André Tiraqueau

- 26 April – Jean Fernel, physician (born 1497)

=== Full date missing ===
- Côme Clausse, notary and secretary of the king, Secretary of State (born c. 1530)
- André Tiraqueau, jurist and politician (born 1488)
- Guillaume Bochetel, statesman and diplomat
- Claude d'Urfé, French royal official (born 1501)
- Jean Maynier, public official, First President of the Parliament of Aix-en-Provence (born 1495)
- Clément Janequin, composer (born c. 1485)
- Mellin de Saint-Gelais, poet (born c. 1491)
