= 1565 in France =

- Decades: 1540s; 1550s; 1560s; 1570s; 1580s
- See also: History of France; Timeline of French history; List of years in France

Events from the year 1565 in France.

== Incumbents ==
- Monarch – Charles IX

== Events ==
- January 1 – Recognized as the first day of the year by the royal chancellery according to the Edict of Roussillon (1564) article 39.
- September 4 – The Spanish fleet of Pedro Menéndez de Avilés lands in modern-day Florida to oust the French under Jean Ribault. He later destroys the French colony of Fort Caroline.
- Lycée Alexandre Ribot founded in Saint-Omer as a Walloon Jesuit college.

== Births ==
- October 6 – Marie de Gournay, writer (died 1645)

== Deaths ==
- June 12 – Adrianus Turnebus, classical scholar (born 1512)
- September 13 – William Farel, evangelist (born 1489)
- October 12 – Jean Ribault, explorer and colonist (born 1520)
- c. October 22 – Jean Grolier de Servières, bibliophile (born 1479)
