= 1500 =

1500 in various calendars
- Gregorian calendar: 1500; MD
- Ab urbe condita: 2253
- Armenian calendar: 949; ԹՎ ՋԽԹ
- Assyrian calendar: 6250
- Balinese saka calendar: 1421–1422
- Bengali calendar: 906–907
- Berber calendar: 2450
- English Regnal year: 15 Hen. 7 – 16 Hen. 7
- Buddhist calendar: 2044
- Burmese calendar: 862
- Byzantine calendar: 7008–7009
- Chinese calendar: 己未年 (Earth Goat); 4197 or 3990 — to — 庚申年 (Metal Monkey); 4198 or 3991
- Coptic calendar: 1216–1217
- Discordian calendar: 2666
- Ethiopian calendar: 1492–1493
- Hebrew calendar: 5260–5261
- Hindu calendars
- Vikram Samvat: 1556–1557
- Shaka Samvat: 1421–1422
- Kali Yuga: 4600–4601
- Holocene calendar: 11500
- Igbo calendar: 500–501
- Iranian calendar: 878–879
- Islamic calendar: 905–906
- Japanese calendar: Meiō 9 (明応９年)
- Javanese calendar: 1417–1418
- Julian calendar: 1500; MD
- Korean calendar: 3833
- Minguo calendar: 412 before ROC 民前412年
- Nanakshahi calendar: 32
- Thai solar calendar: 2042–2043
- Tibetan calendar: ས་མོ་ལུག་ལོ་ (female Earth-Sheep); 1626 or 1245 or 473 — to — ལྕགས་ཕོ་སྤྲེ་ལོ་ (male Iron-Monkey); 1627 or 1246 or 474

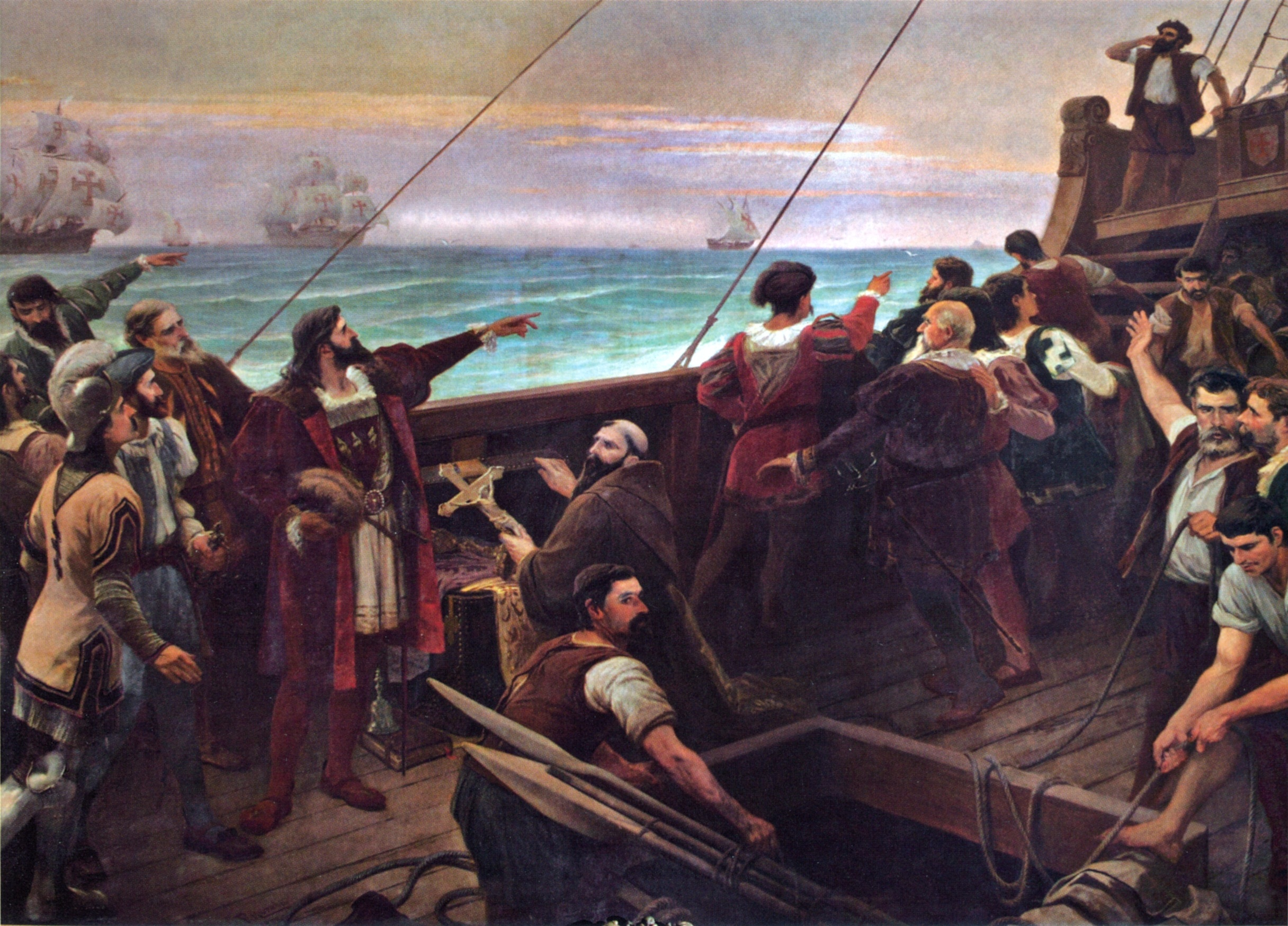
April 22: Pedro Álvares Cabral and his crew land in Brazil and claim it for Portugal

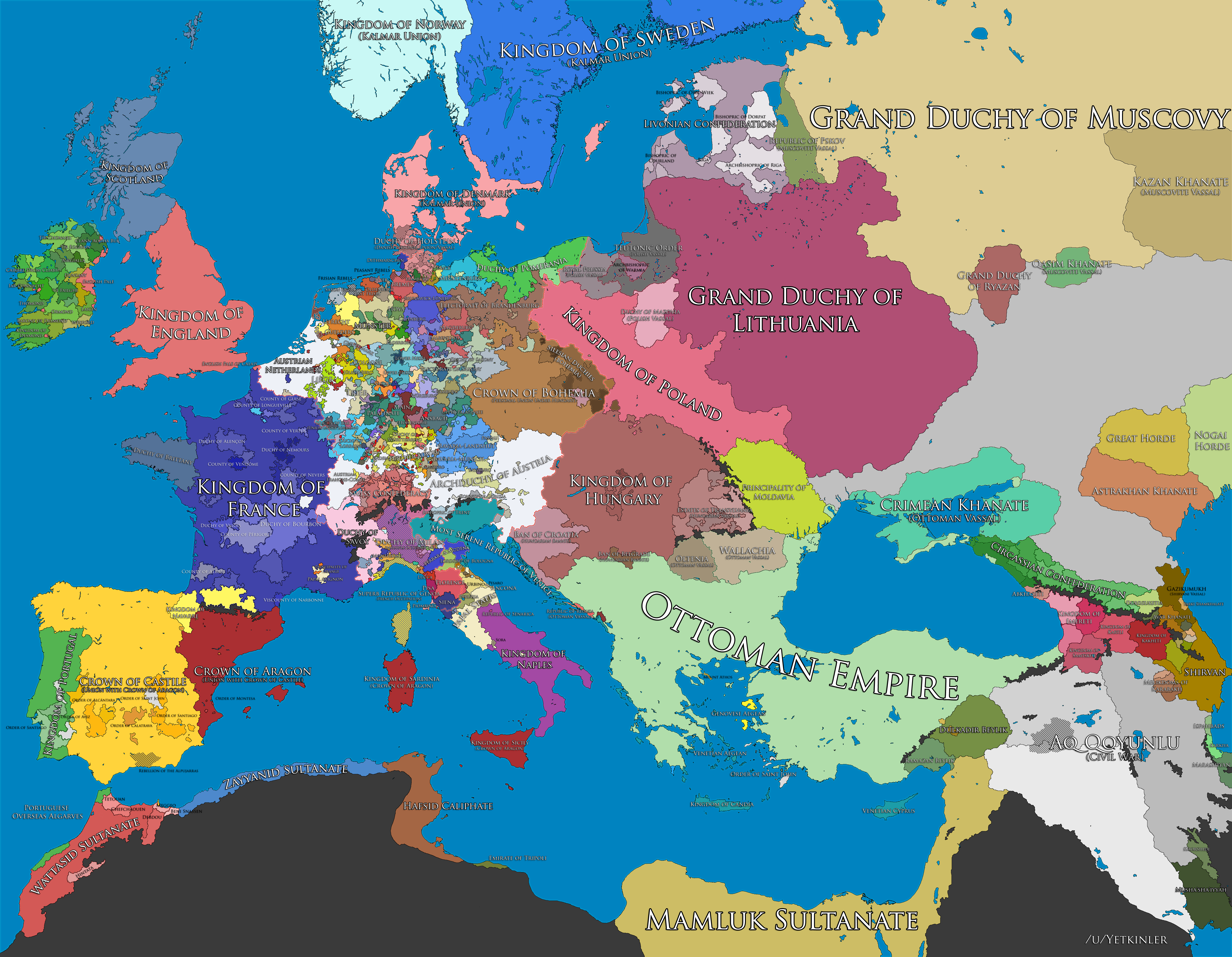
Europe in 1500

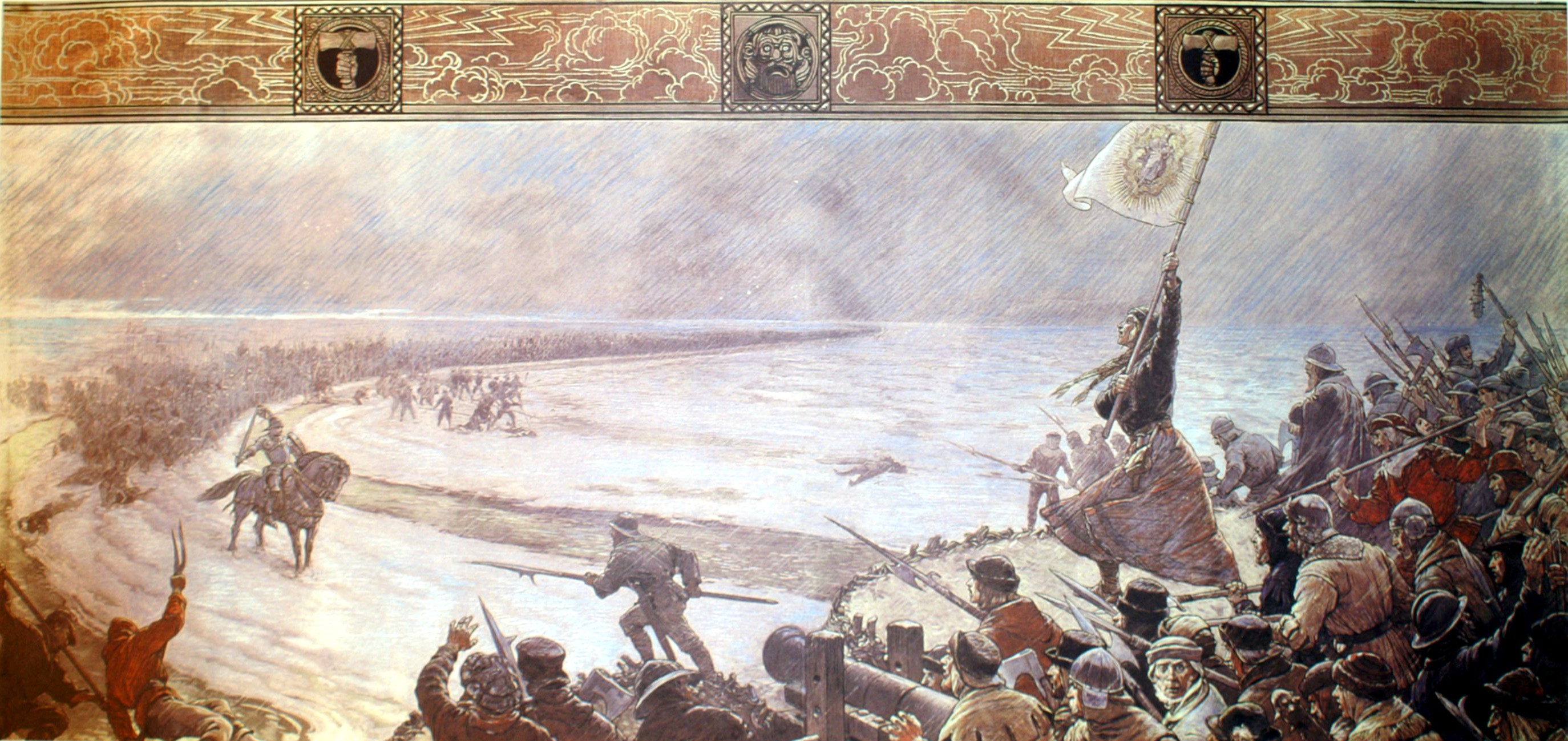
February 17: Battle of Hemmingstedt

Year 1500 (MD) was a leap year starting on Wednesday in the Julian calendar. It was the last year of the 15th century. The year 1500 was not a leap year in the proleptic Gregorian calendar.

The year 1500 was seen as being especially important by many Christians in Europe, who thought it would bring the beginning of the end of the world. Their belief was based on the phrase "half-time after the time", when the apocalypse was due to occur, which appears in the Book of Revelation and was seen as referring to 1500. This time was also just after the Old World's discovery of the Americas in 1492, and therefore was influenced greatly by the New World.

Historically, the year 1500 is also often identified, somewhat arbitrarily, as marking the end of the Middle Ages and beginning of the early modern period.

The end of this year marked the halfway point of the 2nd millennium, as there were 500 years before it and 500 years after it.

== Events ==
=== January–March ===
- January 5 – Duke Ludovico Sforza recaptures Milan, but is soon driven out again by the French.
- January 26 – Spanish navigator Vicente Yáñez Pinzón reaches the northern coast of Brazil.
- February 5 – Ludovico Sforza's Swiss mercenary army retakes the city of Milan from the French during the Second Italian War.
- February 17 – Battle of Hemmingstedt: The Danish army fails to conquer the peasants' republic of Dithmarschen.
- March 9 – Pedro Álvares Cabral, with a fleet of 13 ships, departs Portugal on a voyage to the New World.
- March 11 – The Parliament of Bohemia adopts a new constitution that limits the power of King Vladislav II and subsequent Bohemian monarchs.
- March 24 – The day after departing the Cape Verde Islands with the rest of Cabral's fleet, Vasco de Ataíde and his 150 crewmates die when their ship goes down in a storm.

=== April–June ===
- April 22 – Portuguese navigator Pedro Álvares Cabral and his crew on 13 vessels arrive in Brazil, anchoring at Monte Pascoal and naming the country Vera Cruz. Cabral claims the land for the Kingdom of Portugal.
- May 1 – Pero Vaz de Caminha finishes writing his chronicle of the Portuguese discovery of Brazil while accompanying Cabral.
- May 3 – Cabral and his fleet depart from Brazil and sail eastward toward Africa, resuming their journey to India.
- May 5 – Representatives of the English and Spanish royal families sign a treaty at Canterbury for the marriage of 13-year-old Arthur, Prince of Wales (son of King Henry VII and Elizabeth of York) to 14-year-old Princess Catherine of Aragon. Arthur's marriage to Catherine takes place the next year, but Arthur dies five months later; she marries Arthur's younger brother Henry VIII in 1509.
- May 8 – The first guide to distilling of liquor is published, Liber de arte distillandi de simplicibus by Hieronymus Brunschwig.
- May 29 – Traveling eastward from Brazil, Cabral and his fleet run into a storm off of the coast of Africa near the Cape of Good Hope and lose four of their 13 ships. Navigator Bartolomeu Dias is among the persons killed.
- June 1 – Pope Alexander VI issues the papal bull Quamvis ad amplianda, calling on a Roman Catholic crusade against the Ottoman Empire.
- June 29 – A combined force of troops from the Kingdom of France and from the Republic of Florence lay siege to the city of Pisa.
- June 30 – Sultan Abu Sa'id Qansuh of Egypt is overthrown and sent into exile. Al-Ashraf Abu al-Nasir Janbalat is crowned as the new Mamluk sultan, but reigns for less than six months.

=== July–September ===
- July 14 – The Muscovites defeat the Lithuanians and the Poles in the Battle of Vedrosha.
- July 24 – Ottoman–Venetian War: The Turkish fleet of Kemal Reis defeats the Venetians in the Second Battle of Lepanto.
- August 9 – The Ottoman Empire defeats the Venetians and capture Modon and Coron, the "two eyes of the Republic".
- August 10 – Diogo Dias discovers an island which he names São Lourenço, since August 10 is the feast day of Saint Lawrence, a Roman Catholic martyr of the 3rd century. The massive island is later known as Madagascar.
- August 23 – Francisco de Bobadilla, appointed to replace Admiral Christopher Columbus as Spanish Governor-General of the New World, arrives at Santo Domingo on the island of Hispanola. Bobadilla issues an order directing Christopher and Bartolomeo Columbus to appear before him at Santo Domingo.
- September 12 – George the Bearded begins a reign of more than 38 years as Duke of Saxony at the Saxon capital of Emden, after the death of his father, Albert III, who had ruled 36 years. George also becomes George II, Margrave of Meissen.
- September 13 – Pedro Cabral's fleet of nine ships arrives in India, more than six months after departing from Portugal, and lands at the port of Calicut, which had been visited two years earlier by Vasco da Gama.

Christopher Columbus arrested

- September 15 – Christopher Columbus (Cristobal Colon) is placed under arrest, along with his two brothers, Bartolome and Diego, after appearing before Francisco de Bobadilla, who had replaced him as the Spanish Governor of the New World. ("El 15 de septiemre Bobadilla presenta sus credenciales a Colon... Colon habia ejectuado a varios espanoles cargo de gran peso contra el, asi que al fin Bobadilla resolvio enviarlos presos a Espana para que alla se les juzgase."— "On the 15th of September of 1500, Bobadilla presented his credential to Columbus. Columbus had executed several Spaniards charged with great weight against him, so Bobadilla finally decided to send them prisoners to Spain so that they could be tried there.")
- September 23 – Bobadilla hears testimony from 22 witnesses and concludes that the Columbus brothers intended to overthrow him; he has them placed in manacles and chains for deportation to Spain. ("La pesquisa de Bobadilla contra Colon habia comenzado el 23-IX-1500."— "Bobadilla's investigation against Colon had begun on 23 September 1500.")

=== October–December ===
- October 1 – Christopher Columbus and his brothers, arrested and in chains, are deported from Santo Domingo to Spain.
- October 22 – Nasir-ud-Din Shah overthrows the government of his father, Ghiyath Shah, ruler of the Malwa Sultanate (located in much of what is now the Indian state of Madhya Pradesh) for the last 31 years. Upon becoming the new Sultan, Nasir has his brother Ala-ud-Din executed, along with Ala-ud-din's children. Ghiyasuddin is poisoned the following February.
- November 11 – Treaty of Granada: Louis XII of France and Ferdinand II of Aragon agree to divide the Kingdom of Naples between them.
- November 16 – Emperor Go-Kashiwabara accedes to the throne of Meiō era Japan.
- November 25 – Christopher Columbus and his brothers arrive in Spain at Seville "after one of the longest Atlantic crossings in the Columbian years" (six weeks) and released on their own recognizance.
- December 17 – All charges against the Columbus brothers for malfeasance in governing Hispanola are dismissed by King Ferdinand and Queen Isabella.
- December 24 – The Siege of the Castle of St. George ends, and the island of Cephalonia is captured by a joint Venetian–Spanish fleet.
- December 31 – The last incunable is printed in Venice.

=== Date unknown ===
- Europe's population is estimated at 56.7 million people. The world's population is estimated to be between 425 million and 540 million.
- Saxony's mint at Annaberg begins producing guldengroschens, also known as guldiners.
- Although other reports exist, it is thought that the last wolf in England is killed this year, making the species extinct in that country. The wolf is thought to have been killed in Allithwaite, in Cumbria. However, reports of wolf sightings and laws concerning wolf bounties exist in rural areas of the north until the 18th century.
- A group of Māori migrate east from the New Zealand mainland to the Chatham Islands, developing a distinct pacificist culture known as the Moriori (approx. date).

== Births ==
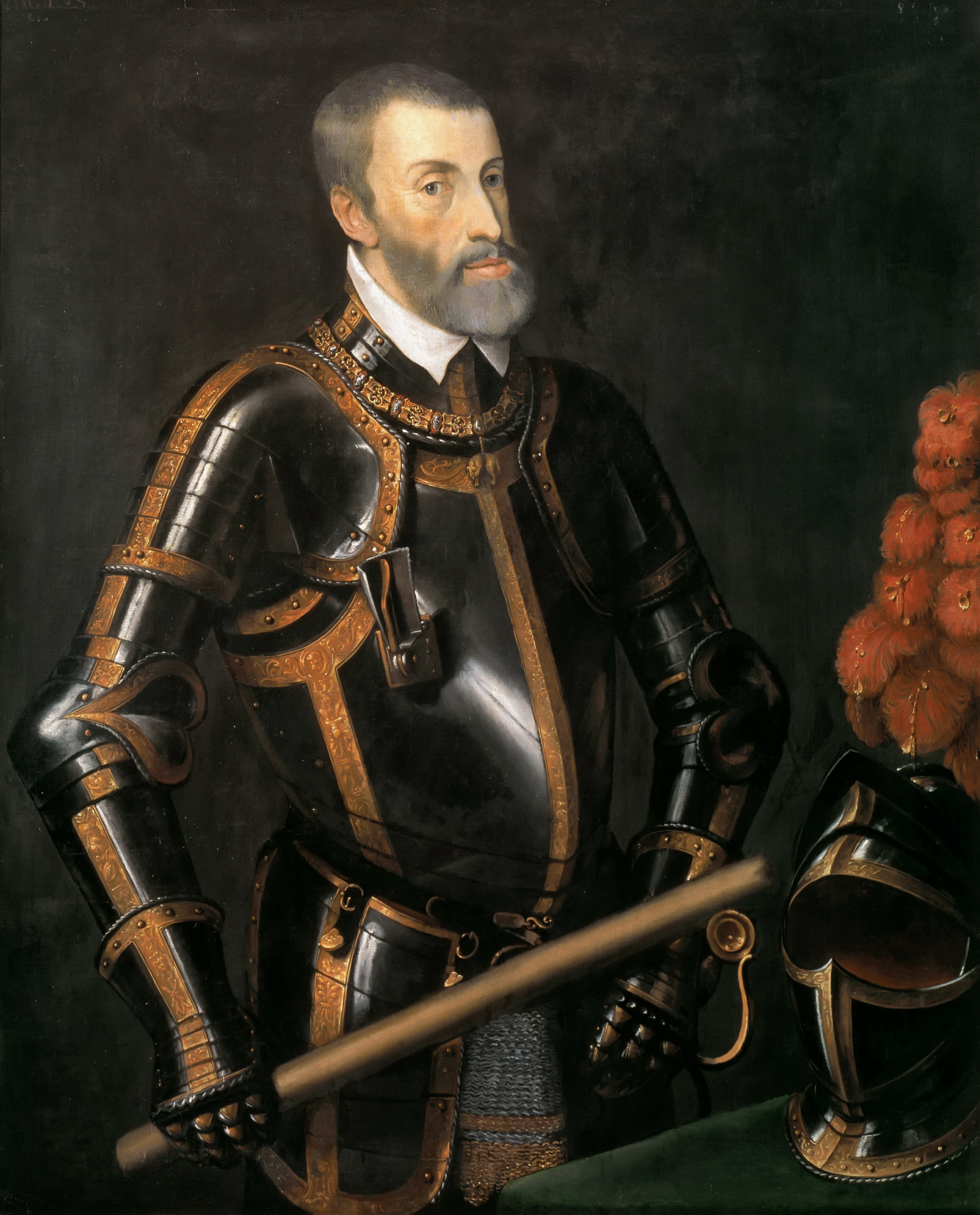
Emperor Charles V

- January 6 – John of Ávila, Spanish mystic and saint (d. 1569)
- January 20 – Jean Quintin, French priest, knight and writer (d. 1561)
- February 22 – Cardinal Rodolfo Pio da Carpi, Italian humanist (d. 1564)
- February 24 – Charles V, Holy Roman Emperor (d. 1558)
- February 27 – João de Castro, Portuguese nobleman and fourth viceroy of Portuguese India (d. 1548)
- March 3 – Reginald Pole, Archbishop of Canterbury (d. 1558)
- April 12 – Joachim Camerarius, German classical scholar (d. 1574)
- April 23
  - Alexander Ales, Scottish theologian (d. 1565)
  - Johann Stumpf, Swiss writer (d. 1576)
- April 27 – Louis, Count of Vaudémont, Italian bishop (d. 1528)
- May 17 – Federico II Gonzaga, Duke of Mantua (d. 1540)
- June 13 – Ernest of Bavaria, pledge lord of the County of Glatz (d. 1560)
- July 1 – Federico Cesi (cardinal), Italian cardinal (d. 1565)
- July 20 – Lorenzo Cybo, Italian condottiero (d. 1549)
- August 16 – Louis Gonzaga (Rodomonte), Italian-French dignitary and diplomat (d. 1532)
- September 5 – Maria of Jever, last ruler of the Lordship of Jever (d. 1575)
- September 7 – Sebastian Newdigate, Carthusian monk and martyr (d. 1535)
- September 17 – Sebastiano Antonio Pighini, Italian cardinal (d. 1553)
- October 17 – Alonso de Orozco Mena, Spanish Roman Catholic priest (d. 1591)
- November 3 – Benvenuto Cellini, Italian goldsmith and sculptor (d. 1571)
- December 6 – Nicolaus Mameranus, Luxembourgish soldier and historian (d. 1567)
- probable
  - Johannes Aal, Swiss theologian and composer (d. 1553)
  - Charles Dumoulin, French jurist (d. 1566)
  - Wu Cheng'en, Chinese novelist (d. 1582)
  - Heinrich Faber, German music theorist (d. 1552)
  - Francisco de Moraes, Portuguese writer (d. 1572)
  - Jeanne de la Font, French poet and culture patron (d. 1532)
  - Solomon Molcho, Portuguese mystic (d. 1532)

== Deaths ==
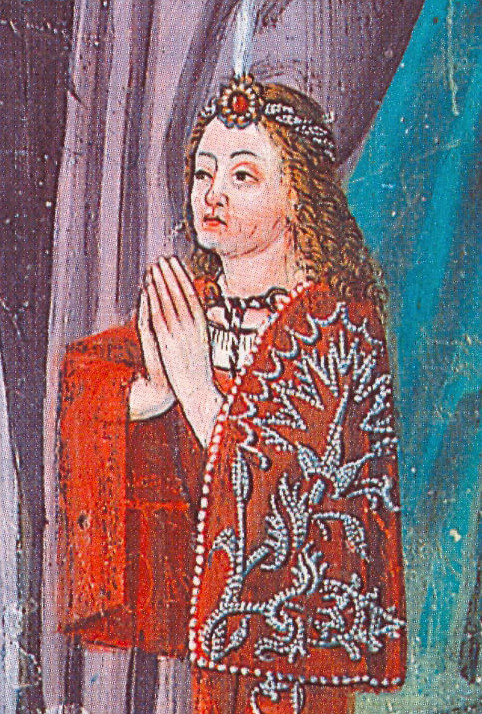
Leonhard of Gorizia

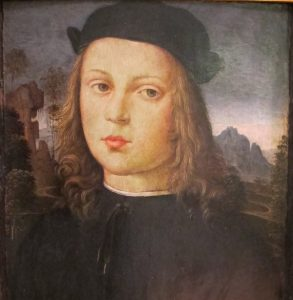
Alfonso of Aragon

=== January–June ===
- February 17 – William III, Landgrave of Hesse (b. 1471)
- April 10 – Michael Tarchaniota Marullus, Greek scholar, poet and soldier (b. c. 1453)
- April 12 – Leonhard of Gorizia, Count of Gorz (b. 1440)
- May 29
  - Bartolomeu Dias, Portuguese explorer (b. c. 1450)
  - Thomas Rotherham, English cleric and minister (b. 1423)
- June 19 – Edmund Tudor, Duke of Somerset, English nobleman (b. 1499)
- June 23 – Lodovico Lazzarelli, Italian poet (b. 1447)

=== July–December ===
- July 14 – Íñigo López de Mendoza y Luna, 2nd Duke of the Infantado, Spanish noble (b. 1438)
- July 19 – Miguel da Paz, Prince of Portugal (b. 1498)
- August 18 – Alfonso of Aragon, prince (b. 1481)
- August 26 – Philipp I, Count of Hanau-Münzenberg, German noble (b. 1449)
- August 30 – Victor, Duke of Münsterberg and Opava, Count of Glatz (b. 1443)
- September 12 – Albert III, Duke of Saxony (b. 1443)
- September 15 – John Morton, English Archbishop of Canterbury (b. c. 1420)
- October 1 – John Alcock, English Bishop of Ely (b. c. 1430)
- October 21 – Emperor Go-Tsuchimikado of Japan (b. 1442)
- November 13 – Philip, Prince of Anhalt-Köthen, German prince (b. 1468)
- date unknown – Antonia of Savoy, Lady Consort of Monaco

Probable

- Juan Pérez de Gijón, Spanish composer (b. 1460)
- Stefano Infessura, Italian humanist writer (b. c. 1435)
- Fyodor Kuritsyn, Russian statesman, philosopher and poet
- Nyai Gede Pinateh, Javanese merchant (b. c. 1450)
