= 1573 in France =

- Decades: 1550s; 1560s; 1570s; 1580s; 1590s
- See also: History of France; Timeline of French history; List of years in France

Events from the year 1573 in France.

== Incumbents ==
- Monarch – Charles IX

== Events ==
- Apr 30 - The spire of Beauvais Cathedral, France, which made it the tallest human-made monument in the world at the time, collapses (never rebuilt)

== Births ==
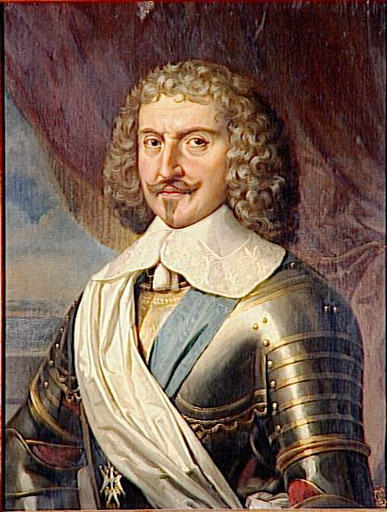
François Annibal d'Estrées

=== Full date missing ===
- Mathurin Régnier, satirist (died 1613)
- Catherine of Lorraine, Abbess of Remiremont (died 1648)
- François Annibal d'Estrées, diplomat and Marshal of France (died 1670)

== Deaths ==
=== Full date missing ===
- Gilles Garnier, hermit
- Jacques Besson, inventor, mathematician and philosopher (born 1540?)
- Michel de l'Hôpital, statesman (born 1507)
- Firmin Lebel, composer and choir director
- Étienne Jodelle, poet and dramatist (born 1532)
