= 1561 in France =

- Decades: 1540s; 1550s; 1560s; 1570s; 1580s
- See also: History of France; Timeline of French history; List of years in France

Events from the year 1561 in France.

== Incumbents ==
- Monarch – Charles IX

== Events ==
- 15 May – The coronation of Charles IX
- 9 September to 9 October – The Colloquy of Poissy, a religious conference which object was to effect a reconciliation between Catholics and Protestants, took place in Poissy.

== Births ==
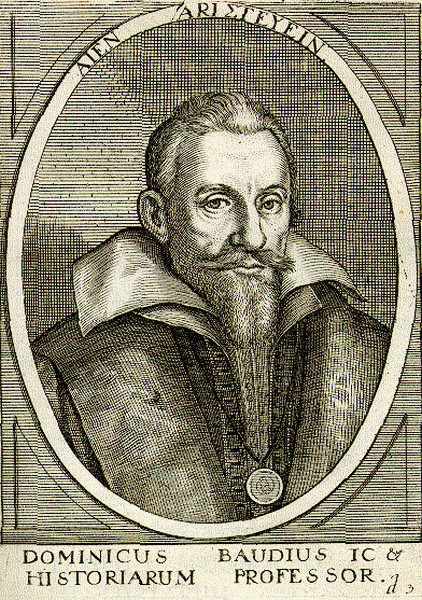
Dominicus Baudius

- 8 April – Dominicus Baudius, poet, scholar and historian (d. 1613)

=== Full date missing ===
- Charles de Lorraine de Vaudémont, Roman Catholic cardinal (d. 1587)

== Deaths ==
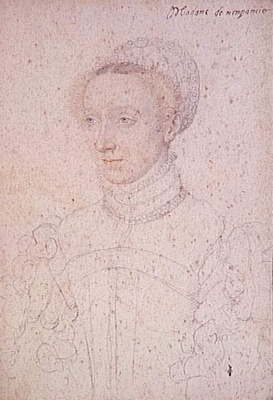
Jacqueline de Longwy

- 13 February – Francis I, Duke of Nevers, commander in the French Royal Army (b. 1516)
- 15 July – Louise de Bourbon, Duchess of Montpensier, (b. 1482)
- 28 August – Jacqueline de Longwy, noblewoman, Countess of Bar-sur-Seine, Duchess of Montpensier (b. 1497).

=== Full date missing ===
- Barthélemy Aneau, poet and humanist (b. ca 1510)
- Claude Garamond, type designer, publisher and punch-cutter (b. ca 1510)
- Claude de Longwy de Givry, bishop and Cardinal (b. 1481)
- Bernard Salomon, painter, draftsman and engraver (b. 1506)
