= 1559 in France =

- Decades: 1530s; 1540s; 1550s; 1560s; 1570s
- See also: History of France; Timeline of French history; List of years in France

Events from the year 1559 in France.

== Incumbents ==
- Monarch – Henry II (until July 10), then Francis II

== Events ==
- The Ancient Diocese of Saint-Omer established.

== Births ==
=== Full date missing ===
- Catherine de Bourbon (died 1604)
- Jacques d'Amboise, surgeon (died 1606)
- Isaac Casaubon, scholar and philologist (died 1614)

== Deaths ==
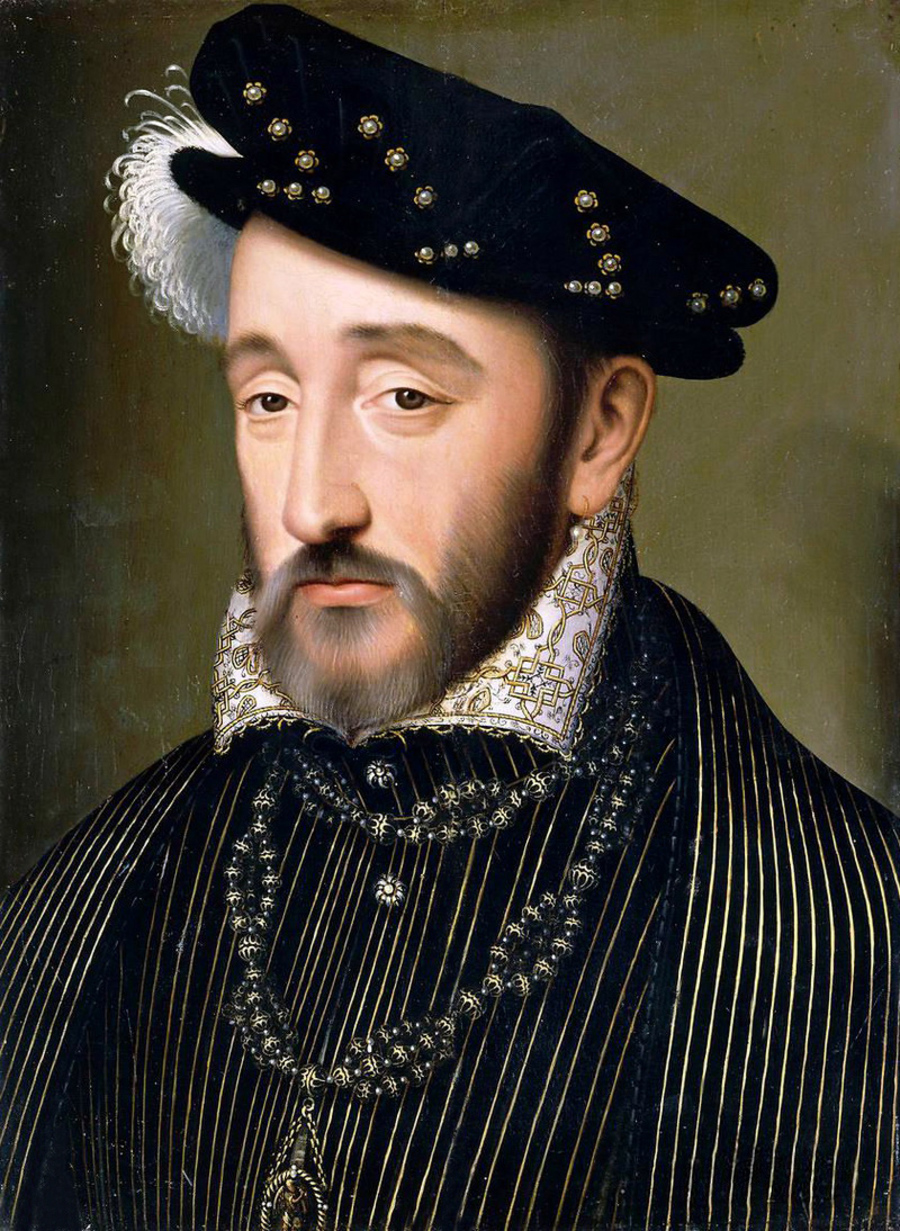
Henry II, King of France 1547–1559

- 10 July – Henry II of France (born 1519)

=== Full date missing ===
- Martin du Bellay, nobleman (born 1495)
- Jacquet of Mantua, composer (born 1483)
- Nicolas Denisot, poet and painter (born 1515)
- Pierre Doré, theologian (born c.1500)
- Antoine Le Maçon, translator (born c.1500)
- Antoine Sanguin, clergyman (born 1493)
- Anne du Bourg, magistrate (born 1521)
