= Alessandro Alessandri =

Neapolitan lawyer (1461–1523)

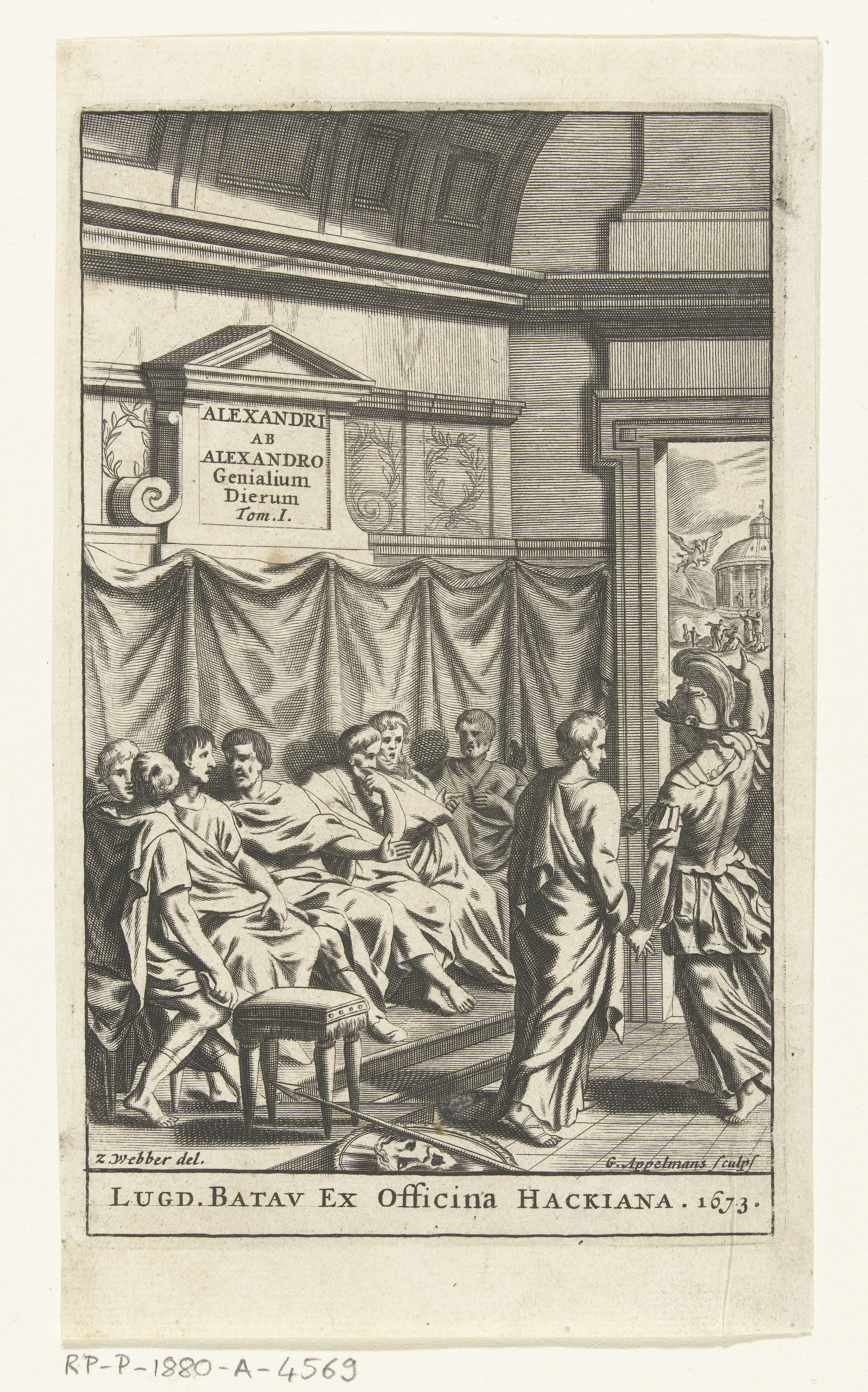
Alessandro Alessandri, Genialium dierum, tom. I, Lugduni Batavorum, ex officina Hackiana, 1673.

Alessandro Alessandri also known as Alexander ab Alexandro (1461–1523) was a Neapolitan lawyer of great learning, who flourished towards the end of the fifteenth and beginning of the sixteenth century, was descended of the ancient and noble family of the Alexandri of Naples.

== Life and career ==
He was born according to some, in 1461. He followed the profession of the law, first at Naples, and afterwards at Rome; but devoted all the time he could spare to the study of polite literature; and at length entirely left the bar, from scruples of conscience respecting the practice of the law, that he might lead a more easy and agreeable life with the muses. “When I saw he,” says he, “that the counsellors could not defend me, nor assist anyone against thy, the power of favour or of the mighty, I said, was in vain. We took so many pains, thus fatigued ourselves with so many reminders or controversies of law, [with learning such a variety of cases so farly involved], thus when I saw the judgment passed, according to virtue none other than its own...To the temerity of every remiss! I corrupted every person who presided over these laws with discussion, Thus giving me determination, not according to these equities involved, nor I, in favour of this or affection, to these individuals involved.”

The particulars of his life are to be gathered from his work entitled “Genialium Dierum:” It appears by it that he lodged at Rome in a house that was haunted; and he relates many surprising particulars about the ghost, which show him to have been credulous, although perhaps not more so than his contemporaries. He says also, that when he was very young, he went to the lectures of Philetphus, who explained at Rome the Tusculan questions of Cicero; he was there also when Nicholas Perot and Domitius Calderinus read their public lectures upon Martial. Some say that he acted as prothonotary of the kingdom of Naples, and that he discharged the office with great honour; but this is not mentioned in his work.

== Death and legacy ==
Apostolo Zeno states that Allessandri died in 1523, and it is generally agreed that he died at Rome, aged about sixty-two. His work, the “Genialium Dirrum,” is a miscellany of learning and philology, somewhat on the model of the “Noctes Atticae” of Aulus Gellius. The first edition was printed at Rome, 1522, fol. (in folio style), under the title of “Alexandri de Alexandro dies Geniales.” Andrew-Tiraqueau wrote a commentary on it, entitled “Semestria,” Lyons, 1586. Notes have also been added to it by Christopher Colerus, and Dennis Gotefrid, or Godfrey, which were printed with Tiraqueau’s commentary, Francfort, 1594, fol. The edition of Paris, 1582, is held in estimation, but the best is that of Leiden, 1673, 2 vols. 8vo. There is another work of his, published before the Genialium Dierum, but afterwards incorporated with it, entitled “Alexandri J. C. Napolitani Dissertationes quatuor de rebus admirundis, &c.” Rome, 4to (quarto), without date, or printer’s name. Mr. Roscoe, who has introduced him in his life of Leo as a member of the academy of Naples, says that his works prove him to have been a man of extensive reading, great industry, and of a considerable share of critical ability, and perhaps as little tinctured with superstition as most of the writers of the age in which he lived.

== Notes ==
- Thomas Curtis (1820). The London Encyclopaedia. Vol. 1. p. 545.
