= 1570 in France =

- Decades: 1550s; 1560s; 1570s; 1580s; 1590s
- See also: History of France; Timeline of French history; List of years in France

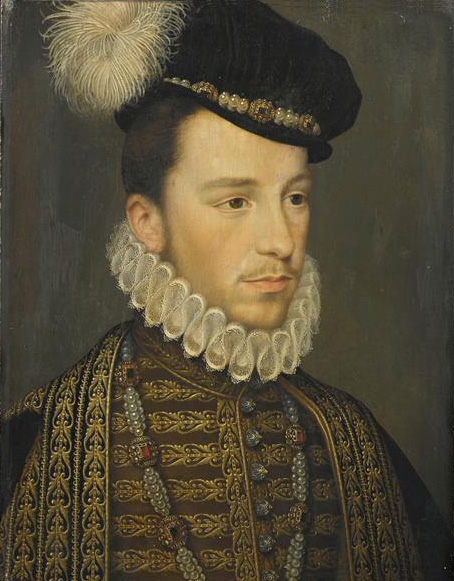

Events from the year 1570 in France.

== Incumbents ==
- Monarch – Charles IX of France

== Events ==
- June- Huguenot Protestant army defeats the royal army at Arnay-le-Duc.
- August 8 - King Charles IX signs the Peace of Saint-Germain-en-Laye, ending the third war of the French wars of religion.
- November 26 - King Charles IX marries Elisabeth of Austria in the town of Mézières in Champagne.

== Deaths ==
- January 8 - Philibert de l'Orme, French architect and writer (b. 1514)
