= 1557 in France =

- Decades: 1530s; 1540s; 1550s; 1560s; 1570s
- See also: History of France; Timeline of French history; List of years in France

Events from the year 1557 in France.

== Incumbents ==
- Monarch – Henry II

== Events ==
- January – Harsh winter weather continues
- 24 July – Edict of Compiègne
- 10 August – Battle of St. Quentin

== Births ==
=== Full date missing ===
- Jean de Biencourt de Poutrincourt et de Saint-Just, nobleman (died 1615)

== Deaths ==
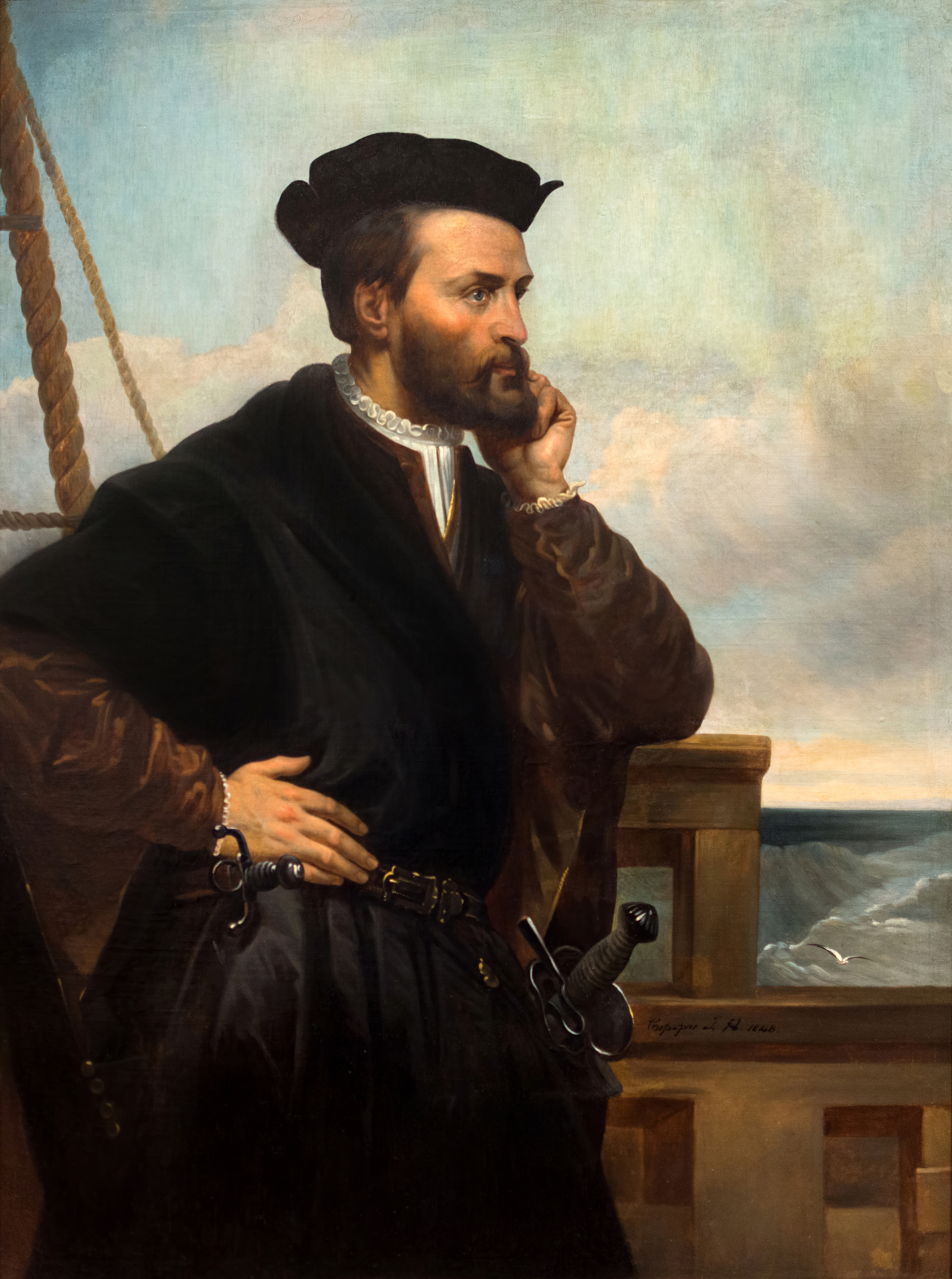
Jacques Cartier

- 1 September – Jacques Cartier, explorer (born 1491)

=== Full date missing ===
- Jacques d'Annebaut, cardinal
- Nicolas Bachelier, surveyor and architect (born 1485)
- Charlotte Guillard, French printer (born c. 1480s)
- Matthieu Ory, Dominican theologian and inquisitor (born 1492)
- Valérand Poullain, Calvinist minister (born 1509?)
- Philibert Babou, cryptographer (born c.1484)
