= 1569 in France =

- Decades: 1540s; 1550s; 1560s; 1570s; 1580s
- See also: History of France; Timeline of French history; List of years in France

Events from the year 1569 in France.

== Incumbents ==
- Monarch – Charles IX of France

== Events ==
- September – A Royalist army under the Duc d'Anjou and Marshal Tavannes forces Coligny to abandon the siege of Poitiers.
- October 3 – Battle of Moncountour: The Royalist forces of Tavannaes and Anjou defeat Coligny's Huguenots.
- The trade compact of 1536 is renewed, exempting French merchants from Ottoman law and allowing them to travel, buy and sell throughout the sultan's dominions and to pay low customs duties on French imports and exports.

== Births ==
- October 13 –Claude de Bullion, French politician who served as minister of Finance (d.1640)
- December 22 – Étienne Martellange, architect (d.1641)

=== Date Unknown ===
- Paul Phélypeaux de Pontchartrain, French politician (d.1621)
- Étienne Binet, Jesuit author (d.1639)

== Deaths ==
- March 13 – Louis, Prince of Condé, French Protestant general (b. 1530)
- May 27 – François de Coligny d'Andelot, French general (b. 1521)
- Pierre-Olivier Malherbe, French explorer (d.1616)
