= 1571 in France =

- Decades: 1550s; 1560s; 1570s; 1580s; 1590s
- See also: History of France; Timeline of French history; List of years in France

Events from the year 1571 in France.

== Incumbents ==
- Monarch – Charles IX of France

== Events ==
- March 25 – Elisabeth of Austria is crowned as queen of France.
- May – King Charles IX issues the edict of Gaillon for taxing printers and book sales.

== Births ==
- December 29 – John of St. Samson, French friar and mystic of the Catholic Church. (d.1636)

== Deaths ==
- March 21 – Odet de Coligny, Cardinal of Châtillon. (b.1517)
- November 10 – Jérôme Souchier, French Roman Catholic cardinal (b.1508)
- December 10 – Philibert Le Voyer, French courtier and diplomat.
