= 1567 in France =

- Decades: 1540s; 1550s; 1560s; 1570s; 1580s
- See also: History of France; Timeline of French history; List of years in France

Events from the year 1567 in France.

== Incumbents ==
- Monarch – Charles IX of France

== Events ==
- January 20 – Battle of Rio de Janeiro: Portuguese forces under the command of Estácio de Sá definitively drive the French out of Rio de Janeiro, ending the occupation of France Antarctique.
- September 28 – Surprise of Meaux: Louis, Prince of Condé, and Gaspard de Coligny fail in an attempt to capture Charles IX and his mother at Meaux.
- September 29 (Michaelmas)
  - The Second War of Religion is triggered by the events of yesterday. Huguenots go on to capture several cities (including Orléans) and march on Paris.
  - Michelade: Protestant massacre of Catholics, including 24 priests and monks, in Nîmes.
- November 10 – Battle of Saint-Denis: Anne de Montmorency, with 16,000 Royalists, falls on Condé's 3,500 Huguenots. The Huguenots surprisingly hold on for some hours before being driven off. Montmorency is mortally wounded.
- The Ancient Diocese of Boulogne is created.

== Births ==
- April 26 – Nicolas Formé, composer (d. 1638)
- August 21 – Francis de Sales, Catholic Bishop of Geneva, born in the Duchy of Savoy (d. 1622)
- September 24 – Martin Fréminet, painter and engraver (d. 1619)
- November 21 – Anne de Xainctonge, religious (d. 1621)
- Pierre Biard, settler and Jesuit missionary (d. 1622)
- Jacques Clément, assassin of Henry III (k. 1589)
- Nicolas Cordier, sculptor, painter and printmaker (d. 1612 in Rome)

== Deaths ==
- January 17 – Sampiero Corso, Corsican mercenary leader and governor of Aix-en-Provence, killed (b. 1498 in the Republic of Genoa)
- November 12 – Anne de Montmorency, Constable of France (b. 1493)
- Ligier Richier, sculptor (b. c.1500)
