= 1563 in France =

- Decades: 1540s; 1550s; 1560s; 1570s; 1580s
- See also: History of France; Timeline of French history; List of years in France

Events from the year 1563 in France.

== Incumbents ==
- Monarch – Charles IX

== Events ==
- February 18 – Francis, Duke of Guise, is assassinated while besieging Orléans
- March 19 – Edict of Amboise is signed at the Château d'Amboise by Catherine de' Medici, acting as regent for her son Charles IX of France, having been negotiated between the Huguenot Louis, Prince of Condé, and Anne, duc de Montmorency, Constable of France, according some toleration to Huguenots, especially to aristocrats; this officially ends the first phase of the French Wars of Religion, and the combined Huguenot and royal armies then march north to besiege the English in Le Havre
- July 28 – The English surrender Le Havre to the French after a siege

== Births ==
- September 21 – Henri, Duke of Joyeuse, general (died 1608)
- November 8 – Henry II, Duke of Lorraine (died 1624)

=== Full date missing ===
- Louise Bourgeois Boursier, royal midwife (died 1636)
- Pierre Matthieu, poet, dramatist and historian (died 1621)
- Jean Titelouze, organist and composer (died 1633)

== Deaths ==
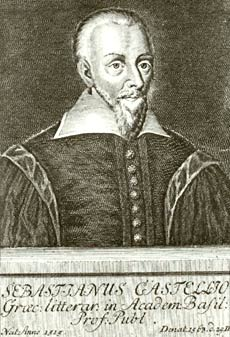
Sebastian Castellio

- February – Pierre de Bocosel de Chastelard, poet (born 1540; executed in Scotland)
- February 24 – Francis, Duke of Guise, soldier and politician (born 1519)
- August 18 – Étienne de La Boétie, judge, political philosopher and sonneteer (born 1530)
- December 29 – Sebastian Castellio, Calvinist preacher and theologian (born 1515)

=== Full date missing ===
- Charles de Cossé, Count of Brissac, courtier (born 1505)
- Odet de Selve, diplomat (born c.1504)
- Jean Poldo d'Albenas, Calvinist historian and translator (born 1512)
