= 1554 in France =

- Decades: 1530s; 1540s; 1550s; 1560s; 1570s
- See also: History of France; Timeline of French history; List of years in France

Events from the year 1554 in France.

== Incumbents ==
- Monarch – Henry II

== Events ==
- August 2 – Battle of Marciano: Senese–French forces are defeated by the Florentine–Imperial army.
- August 12 – Battle of Renty: French forces led by Francis, Duke of Guise turn back an invasion of Picardy by Charles V.

== Births ==
- March 22 – Catherine de Parthenay, French noblewoman and mathematician (d. 1631)
- March 26 – Charles of Lorraine, Duke of Mayenne, French military leader (d. 1611)

=== Date unknown ===
- Jacques Bongars, French scholar and diplomat (d. 1612)

== Deaths ==
- Anne de Laval, Viscountess of Thouars
