= 1555 in France =

- Decades: 1530s; 1540s; 1550s; 1560s; 1570s
- See also: History of France; Timeline of French history; List of years in France

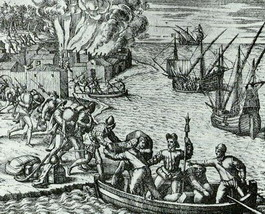
10 July - 5 August: Jacques de Sores burns Havana.

Events from the year 1555 in France.

== Incumbents ==
- Monarch – Henry II

== Events ==
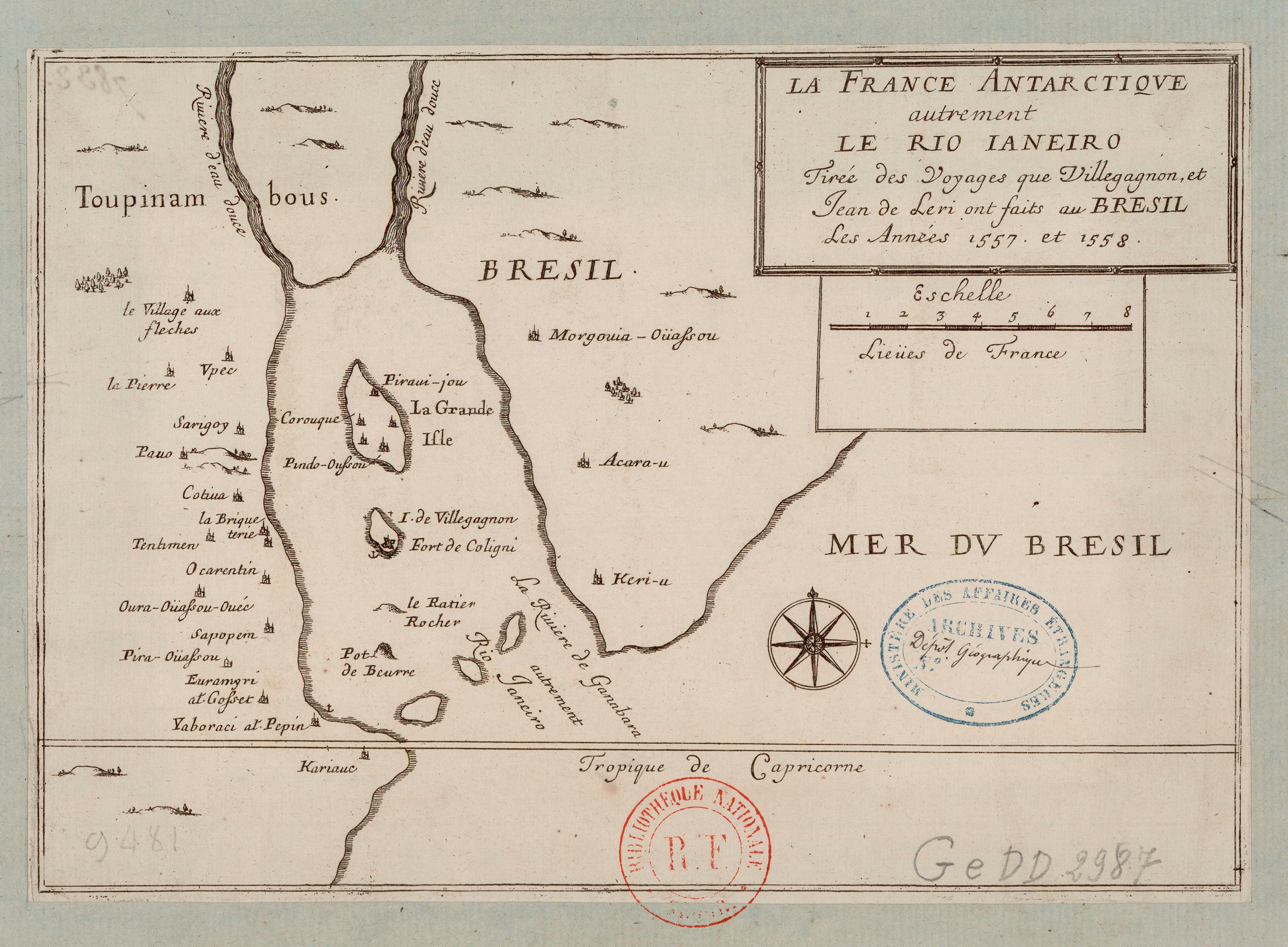
10 November: Antarctic France.

- 26 March - Amboise ordinance punishing with a 1,000 pounds fine usurpers of nobility in France.
- 23 May - Election of Paul IV (Gian Pietro Carafa), 223rd Pope of the Catholic Church (end of the pontificate in 1559). He succeeds Pope Marcellus II, dead after 22 days of reign. He reforms the Dataria and the Inquisition. Coming from an ancient Neapolitan family, traditionally hostile to the Aragonese, he makes an alliance with the King of France to expel the Habsburgs from Naples.
- 25 May - Antoine de Bourbon (1518–1562) and Jeanne d'Albret become king and queen of Navarre.
- 10 July - 5 August - Jacques de Sores, in the head of a French fleet, burns and pillages Havana and the Castillo de la Real Fuerza that the Governor Hernando de Soto had built to counter acts of piracy.
- 15 and 16 July - The French troops are defeated by the Imperials during the battles of Gimnée and Givet, on the border of Netherlands, and must withdraw.
- 15 August - Nostradamus, invited by the queen, arrives in Paris after passing Lyon. He is received at the Court, in Paris and Blois.
- 10 November - In Brazil, a French expedition strong of three ships and 600 colonists and directed by Nicolas Durand de Villegaignon, lord of Torcy and vice-admiral of Brittany, settles in the bay of Rio de Janeiro, to constitute the starting point of a Protestant colony called "France Antarctique" (Antarctic France). Around Guanabara, where the colony settles, two tribes, the Tupinambás and the Margaïas fight each other continuously, submitting their respective prisoners to the worst abuse. The colony of Fort Coligny, built by Villegaignon and his nephew Legendre de Boissy on the Villegaignon island, will be destroyed by the Portuguese on 16 March 1560.
- Nostradamus publishes his Centuries.
- The first Reformed Churches are created. Nobles begin to join the Protestant movement.
- The French troops ransack the Couvin castellany, in Belgium.
- Ami Perrin leads, in Geneva, an unsuccessful riot intended to expel the French religious refugees from the city.
- Jean Calvin sends Jacques l'Anglois from Geneva to the reformed church of Poitiers. The latter is the first Calvinist missionary in France.

== Births ==
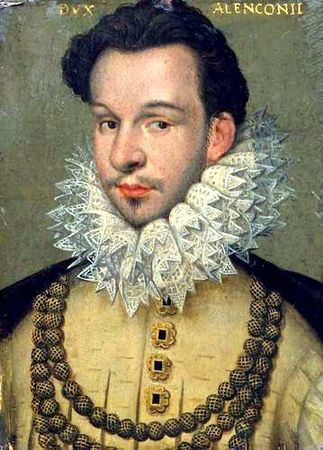
Françis of Alençon, by Nicholas Hilliard.

- 18 March, at the Palace of Fontainebleau – Francis, Duke of Anjou, Alençon, Touraine, Brabant and Château-Thierry, youngest son of Henry II and Catherine de' Medici (d. 1584)
- 6 July – Louis II, Cardinal of Guise, archbishop-duke of Reims from 1574 to 1588 (d. 1588)
- 28 September – Henri de La Tour d'Auvergne, vicomte de Turenne, duc de Bouillon, Marshal of France (d. 1623)

=== Full date unknown ===
- François de Malherbe, poet (d. 1628)

== Deaths ==
- 14 January – Jacques Dubois, anatomist (b. 1478)
- 25 May – Henri d'Albret (b. 1503)

== See also ==
- 1555
