= 1568 in France =

- Decades: 1540s; 1550s; 1560s; 1570s; 1580s
- See also: History of France; Timeline of French history; List of years in France

Events from the year 1568 in France.

== Incumbents ==
- Monarch – Charles IX

== Events ==
- February to March – Siege of Chartres
- 23 March – Peace of Longjumeau

== Births ==
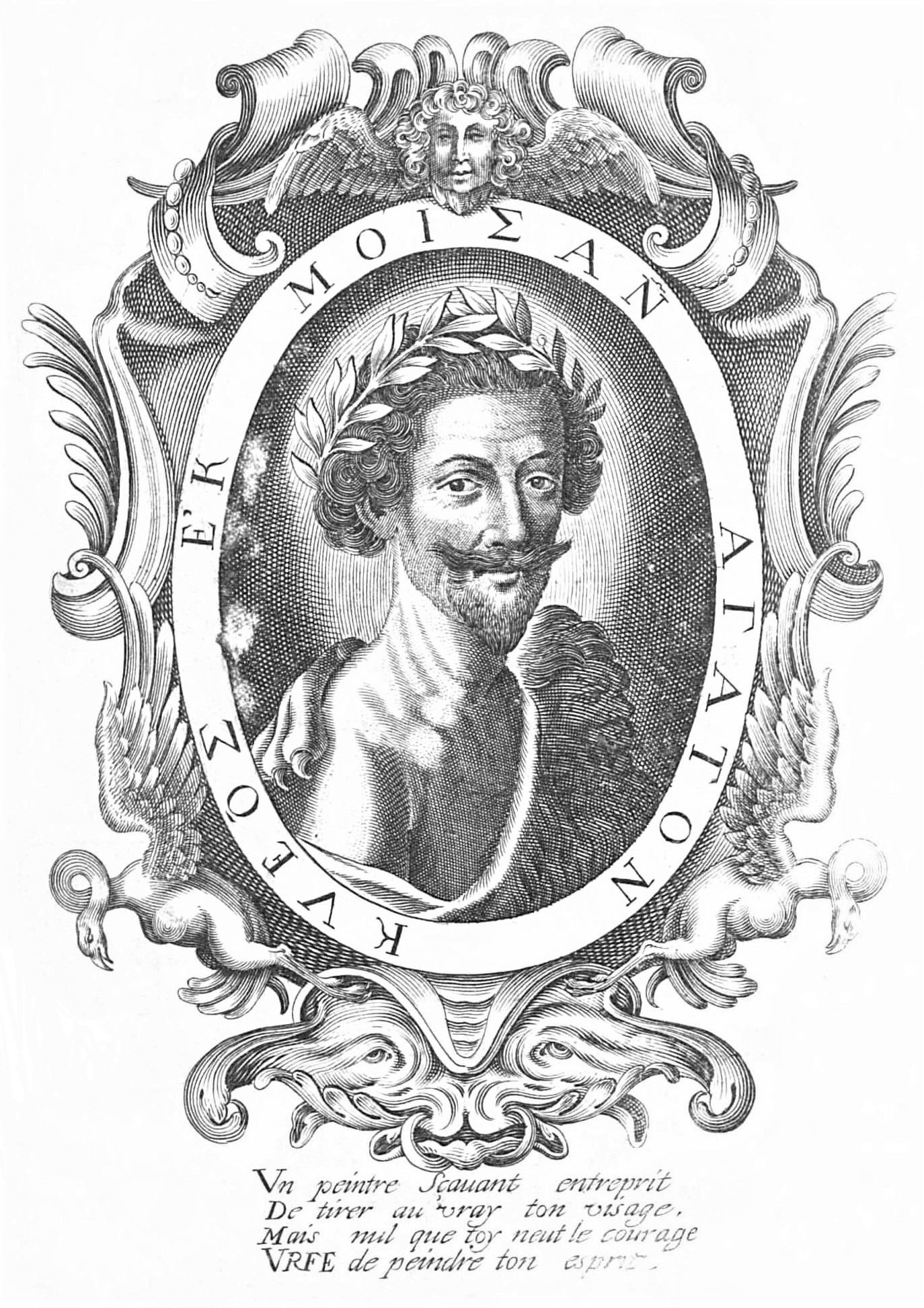
Honoré d'Urfé

- 11 February – Honoré d'Urfé, novelist (d.1625).

=== Full date missing ===
- Charlotte Catherine de La Trémoille, noblewoman (d.1629)
- Nikolaus Ager, botanist (d.1634)

== Deaths ==
=== Full date missing ===
- July – Lancelot de Carle, Bishop of Riez, scholar, poet and diplomat (b. 1508)
- Charlotte de Laval, noblewoman (b.1530)
- Pierre Bontemps, sculptor (b. c. 1505)
- Antoine Héroet, poet
