= 1556 in France =

- Decades: 1530s; 1540s; 1550s; 1560s; 1570s
- See also: History of France; Timeline of French history; List of years in France

Events from the year 1556 in France.

== Incumbents ==
- Monarch – Henry II

== Events ==
- 5 February – Truce of Vaucelles: Fighting temporarily ends between France and Spain.
- February – Royal edict against women who conceal their pregnancy.
- Summer – The false Martin Guerre appears in the village of Artigat.
- 1 September – Dry summer leads to an early and poor harvest and forest fires in Normandy and the north.
- November – The Truce of Vaucelles collapses and the Italian War of 1551–1559 resumes between France and Spain. Spain takes control of the Flanders region, including the modern-day Nord.
- 4 December – Harsh winter causes the Rhône to freeze near Arles.

== Births ==
- March 7– Guillaume du Vair, statesman and philosopher (d. 1621)
- April 27 – François Béroalde de Verville, novelist and poet (d.1626)
- June 24 – twin royal princesses
  - Joan of Valois (stillborn)
  - Victoria of France (d. 1556)
- October 18 – Charles I, Duke of Elbeuf, nobleman (d. 1605)
- November 25 – Jacques Davy Duperron, cardinal, politician and poet (d. 1618)
- December 27 – Jeanne de Lestonnac, founder of the Sisters of the Company of Mary, Our Lady and saint (d. 1640)

== Deaths ==
- June 24 – Joan of Valois, royal princess (stillborn)
- August 17 – Victoria of France, royal princess (b. 1556)
- November 4 – Robert IV de La Marck, Duke of Bouillon, Seigneur of Sedan and a Marshal of France (b.1512)
