= 1562 in France =

- Decades: 1540s; 1550s; 1560s; 1570s; 1580s
- See also: History of France; Timeline of French history; List of years in France

Events from the year 1562 in France.

== Incumbents ==
- Monarch – Charles IX

== Events ==
- January – The Edict of Saint-Germain grants Protestants limited freedom of worship inside houses or outside city walls.
- 1 March – An army led by François de Lorraine, Duke of Guise carries out the Massacre of Vassy, killing 50 and injuring hundreds of Protestants, starting the French Wars of Religion.
- 22 September – Treaty of Hampton Court
- 28 September to 26 October – Siege of Rouen
- 19 December – Battle of Dreux

== Births ==
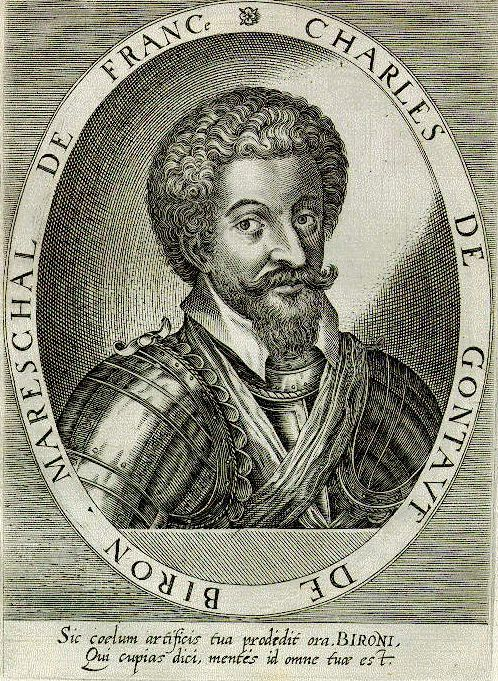
Charles de Gontaut, duc de Biron

- 19 August – Charles II de Bourbon-Vendôme, Cardinal (died 1594)
- 10 December – Roger de Saint-Lary de Termes, duke (died 1646)

=== Full date missing ===
- Charles de Gontaut, duc de Biron, soldier (died 1602)

== Deaths ==
- 13 October – Claudin de Sermisy, composer (born c.1490)
- 31 October – Augustin Marlorat. Protestant reformer (born 1506)
- 19 December – Jacques Dalbon, Seigneur de Saint Andre, soldier (born c.1505)

=== Full date missing ===
- Omer Talon, humanist (born c.1510)
