= 1572 in France =

- Decades: 1550s; 1560s; 1570s; 1580s; 1590s
- See also: History of France; Timeline of French history; List of years in France

Events from the year 1572 in France.

== Incumbents ==
- Monarch – Charles IX of France

== Events ==
- August 18 – Huguenot King Henry III of Navarre marries Margaret of Valois, sister of King Charles and daughter of Catherine de' Medici, in a supposed attempt to reconcile Protestants and Catholics in France.
- August 24 – St. Bartholomew's Day massacre: Catholics in Paris murder thousands of Protestants, including Gaspard de Coligny and Petrus Ramus, at the order of King Charles IX with Catherine de' Medici's connivance. Henry of Navarre and the Prince of Condé barely escape the same fate. This brings about the Fourth War of Religion in France.
- November 9 - Siege of Sancerre: Catholic forces of the king lay siege to Sancerre, a Huguenot stronghold in central France. The fortified city holds out for nearly eight months without bombard artillery. This is one of the last times that slings are used in European warfare.

== Births ==
- January 7 – Antoine de Gaudier, Jesuit writer (d. 1622)
- January 28 – Jane Frances de Chantal, French Catholic noble widow and nun (d. 1641)
- June 8 – Honorat de Porchères Laugier, Poet (d. 1653)
- September 30 – Denis-Simon de Marquemont, Cardinal and archbishop (d. 1626)
- October 27 – Marie Elisabeth of France, Princess of the House of Valois (d. 1578)

=== Full date missing ===
- Charles Bouvard, chemist and the physician of King Louis XIII (d. 1658)
- Jean-Louis de Marillac, Noble, Marshal of France, lieutenant-general of Trois-Évêchés and governor of Metz. (d. 1632)
- René Chartier, Medical Doctor (d. 1654)
- Henri de Gondi, Bishop of Paris (1598–1622) (d. 1622)
- Antoinette d'Orléans-Longueville, Nun, countess and founder of the Congregation of Our Lady of Calvary in 1617. (d. 1618)
- Philippe Danfrie, Medalist (d. 1604)

== Deaths ==
- February 23 – Pierre Certon, French composer (b. c. 1510)
- June 9 – Jeanne d'Albret, Queen of Navarre (b. 1528)
- August 24 through August 31 – Victims of the 'St. Bartholomew's Day massacre'-
  - Gaspard de Coligny, French Protestant leader (b. 1519)
  - Claude Goudimel, French composer (b. 1510)
  - Pierre de la Ramée, French humanist scholar (b. 1515)
  - Charles de Téligny, French soldier and diplomat (b. 1535)
- September – Denis Lambin, French classical scholar (b. 1520)
- December 22 – François Clouet, French miniaturist (b. c. 1510)
