= 1560 in France =

- Decades: 1540s; 1550s; 1560s; 1570s; 1580s
- See also: History of France; Timeline of French history; List of years in France

Events from the year 1560 in France.

== Incumbents ==
- Monarchs: Francis II (until December 5), then Charles IX

== Events ==
- March 17 – Leaders of the Amboise conspiracy, including Godefroy de Barry, seigneur de La Renaudie, make an unsuccessful attempt to storm the château of Amboise, where the young French king and queen are residing. La Renaudie is subsequently caught and executed, along with over a thousand of his followers.
- July 6 – The Treaty of Edinburgh is signed between England, France and Scotland. The French withdraw from Scotland. This largely ends the Auld Alliance between France and Scotland, and ends the wars between England and its northern neighbour.
- December 5 – Seventeen-year-old Mary, Queen of Scots, is widowed by the death of her first husband, King Francis II of France. Her mother-in-law, Catherine de' Medici, becomes regent of France.
- December 6 – Charles IX of France succeeds his elder brother, Francis II, at the age of ten.

== Births ==
- December 13 – Maximilien de Béthune, Duke of Sully, French duke (d. 1641)

== Deaths ==
- January 1 – Joachim du Bellay, French poet (b. c. 1522)
- February 16 – Jean du Bellay, French cardinal and diplomat (b. c. 1493)
