= Dominicus Baudius =

French poet and scholar (1561–1613)

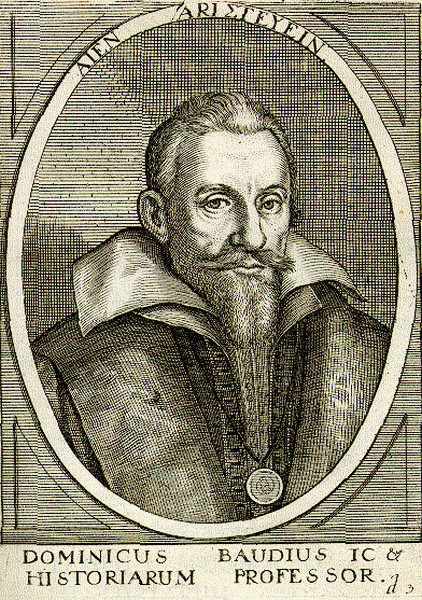
- Baudius in a posthumous 1669 engraving
- Born: Dominique Baudier; 8 April 1561; Lille, Southern Netherlands
- Died: 22 August 1613 (aged 52); Leiden, Netherlands
- Occupations: Poet; scholar; historian; professor
- Spouse: (died 1609)
- Children: 1

Dominicus Baudius (Latinised form of Dominique Baudier; 8 April 1561 – 22 August 1613) was a French poet, scholar, historian and professor. He taught at the University of Leiden from 1603 to 1613.

== Life ==
Dominicus Baudius was born in a Calvinist family on 8 April 1561 in Lille, in the Southern Netherlands (now France). His original name was probably Dominique Baudier, though sources only show his Latinised name, Dominicus Baudius. As a result of the arrival of the new regent of the low countries, the Duke of Alba, in 1568, Baudius moved to Aachen along with his parents and sister. After finishing at the local school he proceeded to study theology first in Leiden from 1578 to 1579 and then in Geneva in 1581. In 1583 he returned to Leiden to study Law. In 1585 he graduated. During his time in Leiden he formed connections with Justus Lipsius and Janus Dousa.

After his study, Baudius became part of an envoy to England, where he stayed from 1583 to 1585 and where he formed a friendship with poet Philip Sidney, introduced by Daniel Rogers. Back in the Netherlands he lived in Middelburg, and for some time served as advocate for the court of Holland in The Hague. In 1591 he left for France, where he remained for ten years. He stayed in Caen and Tours amongst others, and maintained himself with various jobs and support from such friends as Jacques-Auguste de Thou. However, he frequently had financial difficulties, and in 1598 he spent time in prison in Paris because of debt incurred from a love affair.

In 1602 Baudius was in London, after which he travelled to Leiden via Hamburg and The Hague, where he was appointed extraordinary professor of Rhetoric for the University of Leiden. He also taught law, and in 1611 he was appointed ordinary professor of history. In the same year he was appointed historian for the French States-General together with Johannes Meursius, with the assignment to capture the events of 1609–1611. This resulted in the Libri tres de Induciis belli Begici (Three books about the Truce in the Dutch war). In Leiden he befriended amongst others Daniel Heinsius and Hugo Grotius.

He was troubled by his drinking habits and love affairs, and had financial difficulties. His first wife, whom he probably had not married lawfully, died in 1609. After he had an illegitimate child with a prostitute, he was suspended from the senate of the University of Leiden in March 1612. He died on 22 August 1613 in Leiden, at age 52, after days of heavy drinking. Baudius was buried in the Pieterskerk in Leiden.

== Works ==
Baudius attained his greatest fame as a Latin writer. He was erudite and had great control of Latin. He was one of the best letter-writers of his time and he is considered one of the best poets of the Iambic style in humanism. His letters were first published two years after his death. He published his first poetry collection in 1587. In 1591 a Jamborum liber followed after encouragement from Joseph Justus Scaliger and De Thou. In 1607 Baudius published a new version of his poems in Leiden (Poematum nova editio).

Twenty-five years after Baudius' death, Petrus Scriverius published a small collection of Baudius' work under the title of Amores.

- P.L.M. Grootens, Dominicus Baudius. Een levensschets uit het Leidse humanistenmilieu 1561-1613, Nijmegen-Utrecht 1942
