= Adrianus Turnebus =

French classical scholar

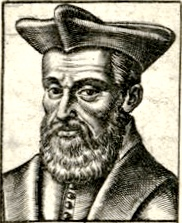
Adrien Turnèbe

Adrianus Turnebus (French: Adrien Turnèbe or Tournebeuf; 1512 – 12 June 1565) was a French classical scholar.

== Life ==
Turnebus was born in Les Andelys in Normandy. At the age of twelve he was sent to Paris to study, and attracted great notice by his remarkable abilities. After having held the post of professor of belles-lettres in the University of Toulouse, in 1547 he returned to Paris as professor (or royal reader) of Greek at the College Royal. In 1562 he exchanged this post for a professorship in Greek philosophy.

In 1552 he was entrusted with the printing of the Greek books at the royal press, in which he was assisted by his friend, Guillaume Morel. Joseph Justus Scaliger was his pupil. He died of tuberculosis on 12 June 1565 in Paris.

Montaigne wrote that he "knew more and better, what he knew, than any man in his age or of many ages past".

He was the father of Odet de Turnèbe.

== Works ==
His works chiefly consist of philological dissertations, commentaries (on Aeschylus, Sophocles, Theophrastus, Philo and portions of Cicero), and translations of Greek authors into Latin and French. His son Étienne published his complete works in three volumes (Strassburg, 1600), and his son Adrien published his Adversaria, containing explanations and emendations of numerous passages by classical authors.
