= Pierre Doré =

French theologian (c. 1500–1559)

Pierre Doré (Auratus) (c.1500 – 19 May 1559) was a French Dominican theologian and controversialist.

== Life ==
Doré was born at Orléans. He entered the Dominican Order in 1514 and won his degrees at Paris, in 1532. Though elected to the office of prior at Blois in 1545, Doré continued to preach throughout the provinces.

At Châlons the bishop, impressed by his eloquence, entrusted him with the reform of the Carthusian monastery of Val des Choux (Vallis Caulium). For the same reason, Claude de Lorraine, Duke of Guise, and his consort, Antoinette de Bourbon, chose him as confessor. He died in Paris.

== Works ==
He wrote thirty-five ascetico-theological works, which may be redactions of sermons. Chief among these is "Les voies du Paradis enseignees par notre Sauveur Jesus-Christ en son evangile", which appeared twice at Lyon in 1538 (Paris, 1540; Lyon, 1586; Rome, 1610).

In his "Paradoxa ad profligandas haereses ex divi Pauli epistolis selecta", he wrote against the Huguenots, but soon turned to writing ascetical commentaries on the Psalms. When Henry II of France entered Paris in 1548, Doré wrote a Latin ode which won for him the post of court preacher and royal confessor.

His defence of the Eucharist appeared in 1549, and two years later he published two other apologies on the same subject and another on the Mass. At the same time he prepared his defence of the Faith in three volumes, as also another attack on the Calvinists. He closed his literary career with two works on Justification.

Though Doré used the French vernacular very loosely, and indulged in far-fetched descriptions, which Rabelais (Pantagruel, ch. xxii) ridicules, his works were both original and orthodox. They include literal translations of the Eucharistic hymns of Thomas Aquinas, his Latin poems, and the Office for a Feast of St. Joseph, which he composed at the command of Pope Paul III.
