= André Tiraqueau =

French jurist and politician

André Tiraqueau (Latin: Andreas Tiraquellus) (1488–1558) was a French jurist and politician. He is known also as a patron of François Rabelais, and the character Trinquamelle in Gargantua and Pantagruel is traditionally identified with Tiraqueau.

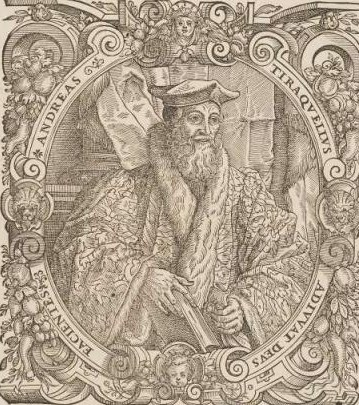
André Tiraqueau, 1574 engraving by Jost Amman.

== Life ==
He was a legal humanist based in Fontenay-le-Comte, Poitou, where he knew Amaury Bouchard. He married Marie Cailler, daughter of Artus Caillier, a legal officer at Fontenay; the marriage took place in 1512, when she was still very young, and he proceeded with two works on the Querelle des femmes and married life.

Tiraqueau held the local legal offices of juge-châtelain and lieutenant. He was appointed a counsellor of the Parlement of Paris in 1531.

Pierre Bayle included a chapter on "Books and Children" in his Historical and Critical Dictionary calling into question a claim that Tiraqueau fathered 45 children and wrote as many books, creating one of each per year.

== Works ==
Tiraqueau had a reputation as a prolific writer.

- De legibus connubialibus (1513). This work justifies the legal disabilities of women by appeal to jus gentium and divine law. It began as part of a commentary on the customs of Poitou, and grew through numerous editions.

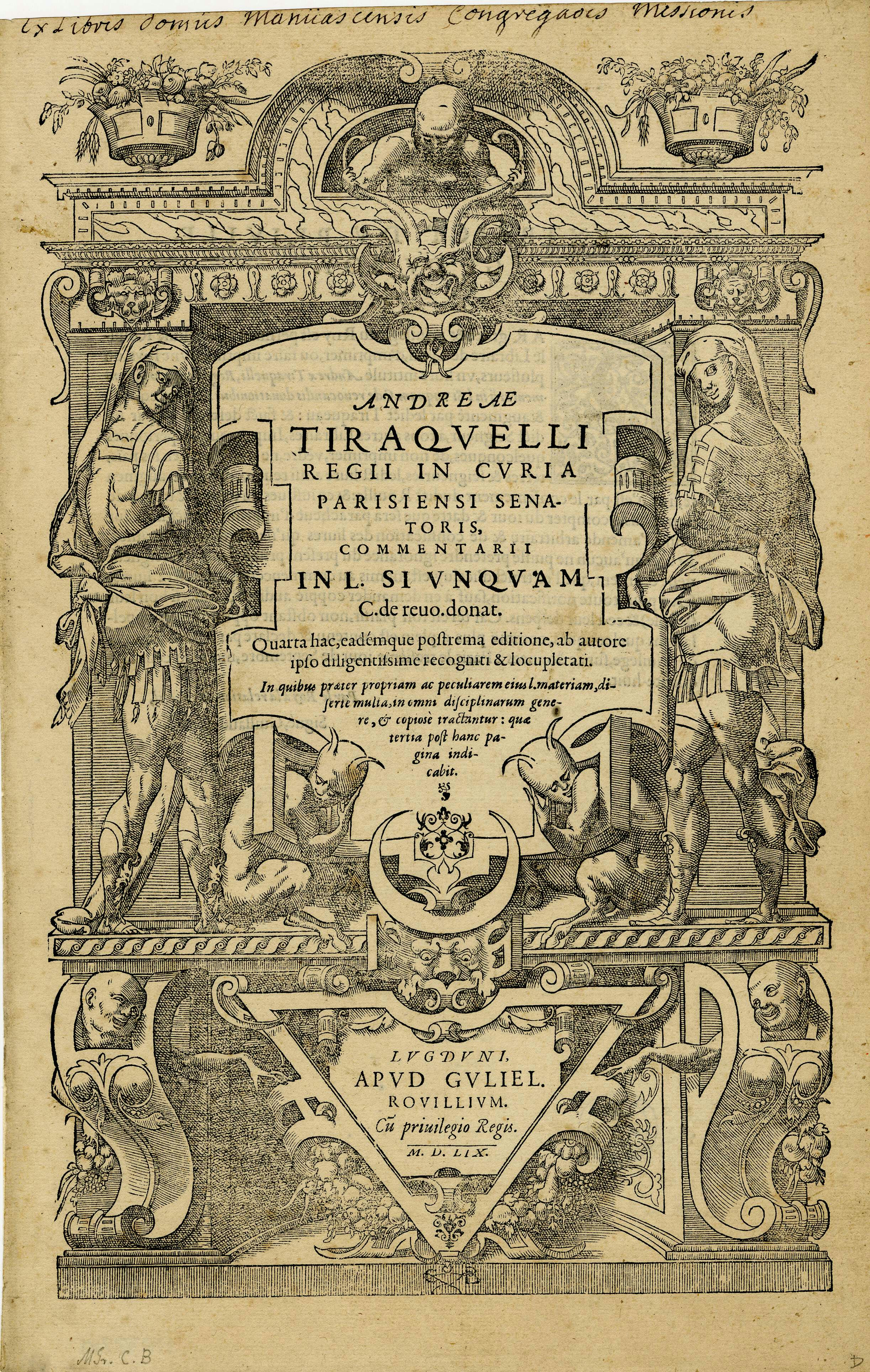
Illustrated title page of Commentarii in l(egem) Si unquam (1559), woodcut by Claude Bezoard.

- De nobilitate et jure primigeniorum (1549). This work addressed the topic of nobility as social status and recognition, picking up from Bartolus who wrote a work with the same title. Tiraqueau's theory followed that of Bartolus, on the political and legal origins of nobility, as opposed to kinship; and integrated it with the French situation and the scientia juris. The theory was undermined in the longer term by the French kings' use of venal office.

He wrote a commentary on the Geniales dies of Alessandro Alessandri.

Tiraqueau's works were collected, firstly in five volumes (1574), and then in seven (Frankfurt, from 1597). The arrangement in the seven-volume edition is:

- I: On nobility and primogeniture;
- II: legal rights in marriage;
- III: law of repossession;
- IV: Cessante causa;
- V: Legacies for pious use, and other works;
- VI: Commentary on Si unquam;
- VII: moderation of punishments.

== Friendship with Rabelais ==
Rabelais met Tiraqueau during his time as an Observantine Franciscan at Fontenay; he participated in the humanist circle there, in the early 1520s. Tiraqueau was the dedicatee of an edition by Rabelais of the letters of Giovanni Manardi.

As Rabelais was writing his Tiers Livre, Tiraqueau was collecting authorities for his work on nobility (1549). It has been suggested that Rabelais took largely from Tiraqueau's references. Tiraqueau apparently cooled towards Rabelais in later life, and played down his public disagreement with Amaury Bouchard over women (of which Rabelais made much literary use).
