= Alonso de Orozco Mena =

Spanish Roman Catholic priest

Saint Alonso de Orozco Mena O.S.A.
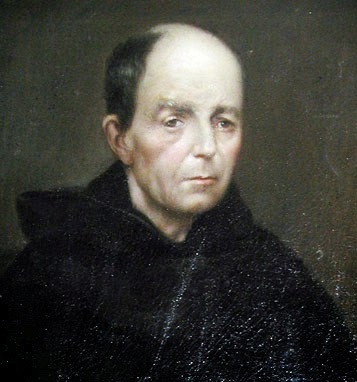

Priest
- Born: 17 October 1500; Oropesa, Toledo, Spain
- Died: 19 September 1591 (aged 90); Madrid, Spain
- Venerated in: Roman Catholic Church
- Beatified: 15 January 1882, Saint Peter's Basilica, Kingdom of Italy by Pope Leo XIII
- Canonized: 19 May 2002, Saint Peter's Square, Vatican City by Pope John Paul II
- Feast: 19 September
- Attributes: Augustinian habit; Crucifix

Alonso de Orozco Mena (17 October 1500 – 19 September 1591) was a Spanish Roman Catholic priest from the Augustinian order. He was well known across Spain for his preaching abilities and for an austere and humble life.

He was beatified in 1882 after the recognition of two healings attributed to him as miracles and was canonized in 2002 after a third received papal approval. His feast is on the date of his death - 19 September - on an annual basis.

== Life ==
Alonso de Orozco was born in Toledo on 17 October 1500. He had at least one older brother. As a child he studied music and served in a church choir. He was enrolled in a school in Salamanca at the age of 14 at the behest of his parents.

Orozco became a member of the Order of Saint Augustine in his 20s and was a spiritual student of Thomas of Villanova - future saint. In fact the latter preached a Lenten sermon in 1520 which awakened in him a religious calling to life as a priest; his solemn profession was in 1522 on the eve of Pentecost. He was ordained to the priesthood in 1527 and became a noted preacher. He travelled to the missions in Mexico in 1549 but severe arthritis caused him to be sent back to Spain where he served as prior of his convent in Valladolid in 1554. He also served as a preacher to the court of Charles V and moved with them to Madrid in 1561.

He refused to accept the benefits of the court and reaffirmed his desire to live as a humble and simple monk. He made himself accessible to all of those whom needed his counsel and he spent all available time to visit the sick and those in prisons. He became a noted Spanish and Latinist in writing and he had even compiled histories of his order. He even helped the order establish new monasteries and convents.

He fell ill with a fever in August 1591 and his health took a sharp decline. He died on 19 September 1591. News of his death spread and drew countless to his funeral.

== Canonization ==
The sainthood process commenced on 13 December 1676 under Pope Innocent XI and the introduction of the process on a local level granted Orozco the posthumous title Servant of God. Two processes were held in Spain to assemble both documentation in relation to his life and witness testimonies. Both were a requirement for the process to proceed to the next phase. Pope Clement XII approved that he lived a life of heroic virtue and declared him to be Venerable on 15 August 1732.

He was beatified on 1 October 1881 after Pope Leo XIII approved two healings that were attributed to him as miracles. A third allowed for Pope John Paul II to canonize him on 19 May 2002.
