= Quamvis ad amplianda =

1500 papal bull calling for a crusade

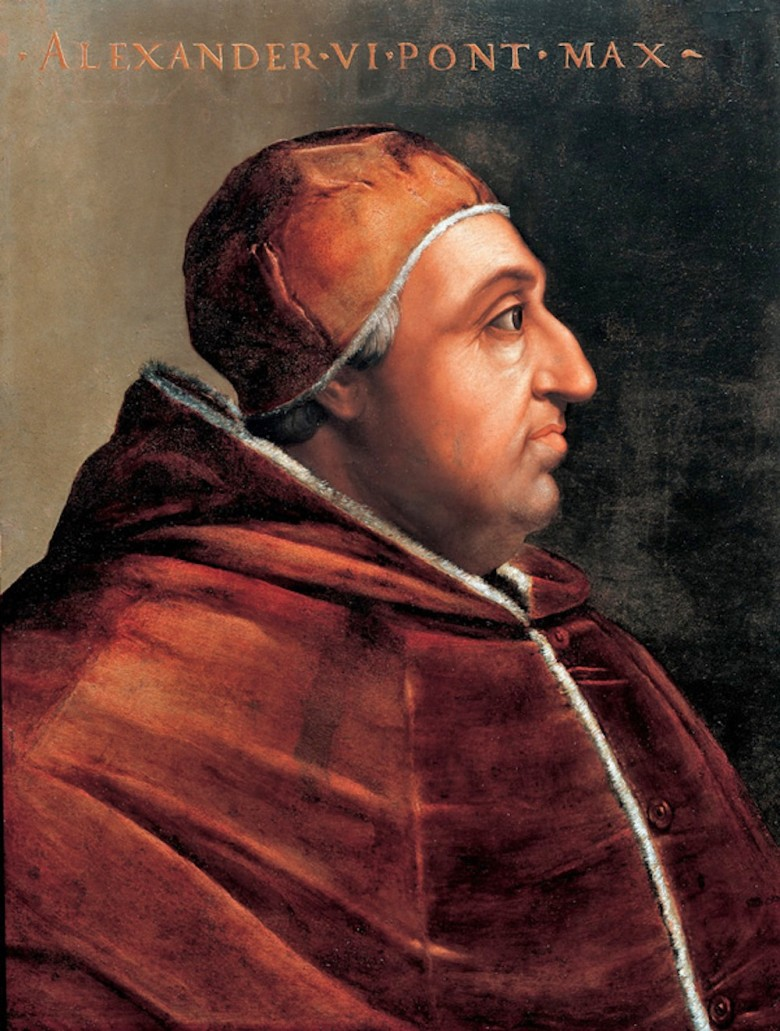
Pope Alexander VI

Quamvis ad amplianda is a papal bull issued by Pope Alexander VI on 1 June 1500 calling for a crusade against the Ottoman Empire in response to Ottoman invasions of Venetian territories in Greece. After requests for funds and military support from the Imperial Diet of the Holy Roman Empire were rejected, a universal tithe was instituted with the bull.

== Sources ==
- Francisco, Adam S. (2007). Martin Luther and Islam: A Study in Sixteenth-Century Polemics and Apologetics. Brill.
- Nowakowska, Natalia (2004). "Poland and the Crusade in the Reign of King Jan Olbracht, 1492–1501". In Housley, Norman (ed.). Crusading in the Fifteenth Century: Message and Impact. Palgrave Macmillan.
- Setton, Kenneth Meyer (1976). The Papacy and the Levant, 1204–1571. American Philosophical Society. ISBN 9780871691149.
