= Cardin Le Bret =

French jurist

Cardin Le Bret (1558–1655) was a French jurist, known as the major supporter of the legal basis for the rule of Cardinal Richelieu in France.

On the key issue for absolutist conceptions of government, sovereignty, he stated that “sovereignty is no more divisible than the point in geometry”. His 1632 book on sovereignty has been called “the juridical handbook of the Richelieu regime”.
