= Claude Dausque =

French Jesuit

Claude Dausque (3 December 1566 – 17 January 1644) was a French Jesuit.
