= Jacques Brunel =

French organist and composer (died 1564)

- Origin: France
- Died: 1564
- Occupations: Organist and composer

Jacques Brunel (Brumel, Brumello, Brunello, Giaches Brumel, etc.) (died 1564) was a French organist and composer, active mostly in Italy.

== Life ==
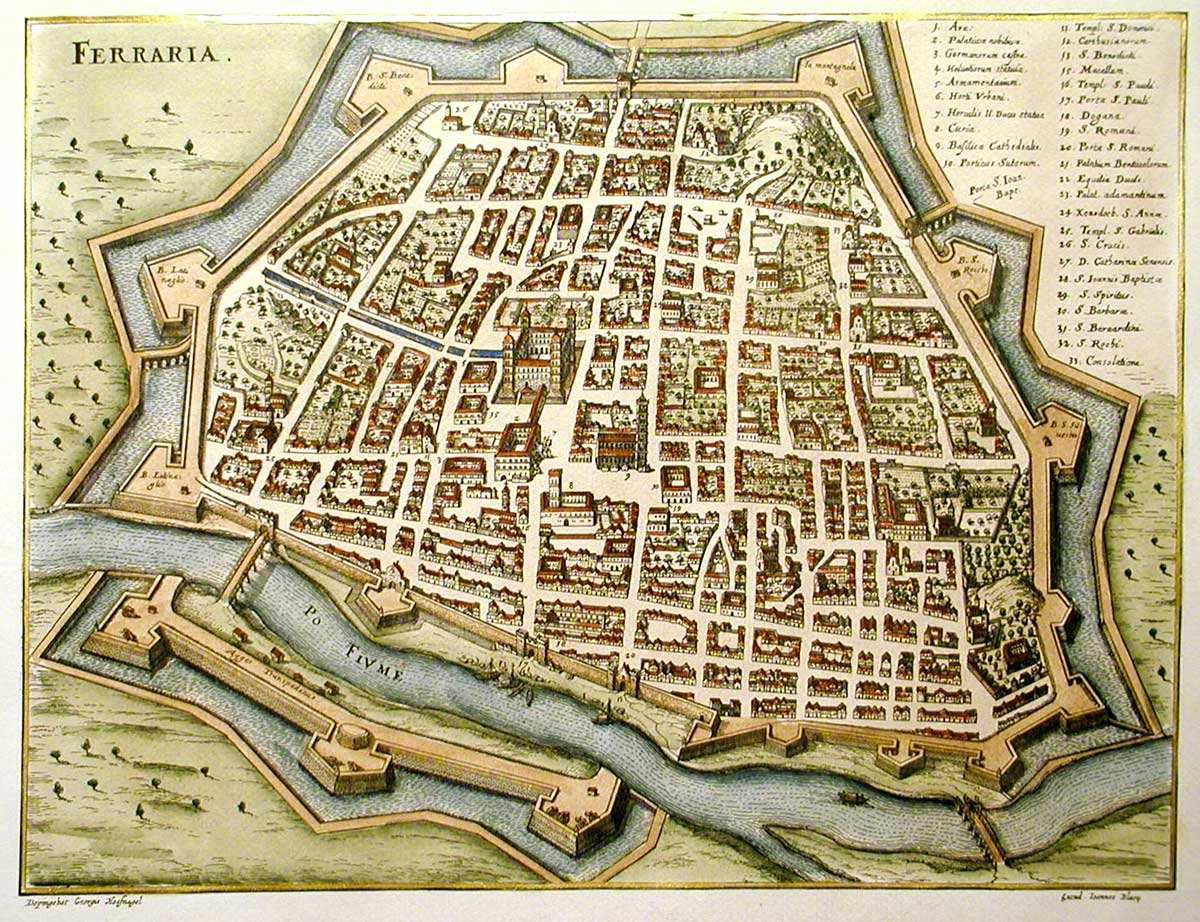
A late 16th- or early 17th-century map of Ferrara, where Brunel lived for at least 32 years of his life

He may have been organist at the Rouen Cathedral until December 1524, when a certain Jacques Brunel left the post. From 1532 until 1564 a Brunel, probably the same person, worked as organist at the Este chapel in Ferrara, France, where in 1547–1558 he served under the famous composer Cipriano de Rore. Between 1543 and 1559, Brunel received money for the keep of a horse, which he needed to travel to oversee the Este chapels at Modena and Reggio nell'Emilia. At the request of Guidobaldo II della Rovere, Duke of Urbino, Brunel also stayed in Pesaro and Urbino in the summer of 1534, and later in 1561–63. The last references to him in the archives are from early 1564: he was last paid in March, and had died by May that year. He was succeeded by his son Virginio Brunel, who later became organist at the Basilica of San Vitale and served there from August 1572 until some time after 1580.

== Works ==
Brunel enjoyed an exceptionally high reputation during his lifetime. Numerous writers, including Cosimo Bartoli, Cinciarino, Jacopo Corfini and Luigi Dentice, praised his skills. Bartoli wrote that Brunel played "with more grace, with more art and more musically than any other, whoever he may be." However, few of his works survive. The most important pieces, a number of ricercars from the so-called Bourdeney Codex, were attributed to Brunel by Anthony Newcomb in 1987. These works are of considerable importance in the evolution of the genre: there are frequent instances of advanced contrapuntal techniques such as inversion and augmentation, hexachord transpositions (inganno) of the subjects; some of the pieces even employ countersubjects. Two ricercares also appear in another manuscript: one imitative, structured like a motet, and the other completely devoid of any imitative passages.

One other piece was attributed to Brunel by Knud Jeppesen: an organ mass discovered in the 1940s in manuscripts that were kept in the main church of Castell'Arquato. The mass, subtitled Messa de la dominica, is signed Jaches at the end of the last Kyrie verset. It is a typical Italian organ mass, consisting of many short pieces for the alternation practice. All of the pieces are in four voices, but the texture is frequently interrupted either by passages in three voices, or with chordal passages which include chords of five, six, or even seven notes.

== List of works ==
- Messa de la dominica
- Ricercare di Jaches (in F)
- Ricercare di Jaches (in d)
- Recercare del nono tuono
- Ricercar sopra la sol fa re mi
- Ricercar del terzo tono
- Ricercar del nono tono
- Ricercar del quinto tono
- Ricercar del duodicesimo tono
- Ricercare del primo tono
- Ricercare del primo tono
- Ricercare del secondo tono
- Ricercare del seconto tono
- Ricercare del terzo tono
- Ricercare del quarto tono
- Ricercare del duodecimo tono
- Ricercare sopra Cantai mentre ch'i arsi [di] Cypriano [de Rore]
