= Guillaume Morel =

French classical scholar (1505–1564)

Gillaume Morel
- Born: 1505; Le Teilleul, Normandy, Kingdom of France
- Died: February 19, 1564 (aged 58–59)
- Occupation: Printer

Guillaume Morel (French pronunciation: [ɡijom mɔʁɛl]; 1505 – 19 February 1564) was a French classical scholar.

After acting as proof-reader in a Paris firm, he set up for himself, and subsequently succeeded Turnebus as king's printer in 1555. His most important work was Thesaurus vocum omnium latinarum, containing a number of quotations from Latin authors, taken from hitherto unpublished manuscripts in the Paris library. He died in Paris.
