= Firmin Lebel =

French composer and choir director

Firmin Lebel (early 16th century – 27–31 December 1573) was a French composer and choir director of the Renaissance, active in Rome. While relatively little of his music survives, he was notable as one of the likely teachers of Palestrina.

He was born in Noyon, but nothing is known of his early life. He was a chaplain at Santa Maria Maggiore, and was maestro di cappella of its Liberian chapel by 1540; while at this post, from late 1540 and possibly continuing for several years, he is thought to have been a teacher of the young Palestrina. In 1545 he became maestro di cappella at the church of San Luigi dei Francesi, a position he kept until 1561, at which time Annibale Zoilo was appointed in his place. On 4 September 1561, he joined the papal chapel; evidently he was highly regarded as a choir director and composer, for the entrance examination was waived in his case, by Pope Pius IV himself. After only four years, however, the chapel choir was dramatically reduced as part of the reforms of the Council of Trent, and Lebel was dismissed, along with many other singers, including Ghiselin Danckerts. Lebel remained in Rome for the rest of his life, and a requiem was sung in his honor in 1574 at the chapel of San Luigi dei Francesi.

Only three of Lebel's works survive, all motets. Two, a setting of the Ave verum corpus and Sancta Maria succurre miseris, are for five voices, and the other, Puer natus est, is for six. Stylistically they are typical of the generation before Palestrina, during which the Franco-Flemish rather than Italians dominated the musical scene in Rome.

== References and further reading ==
- Allan W. Atlas: "Firmin Lebel", Grove Music Online, ed. L. Macy (Accessed May 6, 2006), (subscription access)
- Gustave Reese, Music in the Renaissance. New York, W.W. Norton & Co., 1954. ISBN 0-393-09530-4
