= Charles Dumoulin =

French jurist (1500–1566)

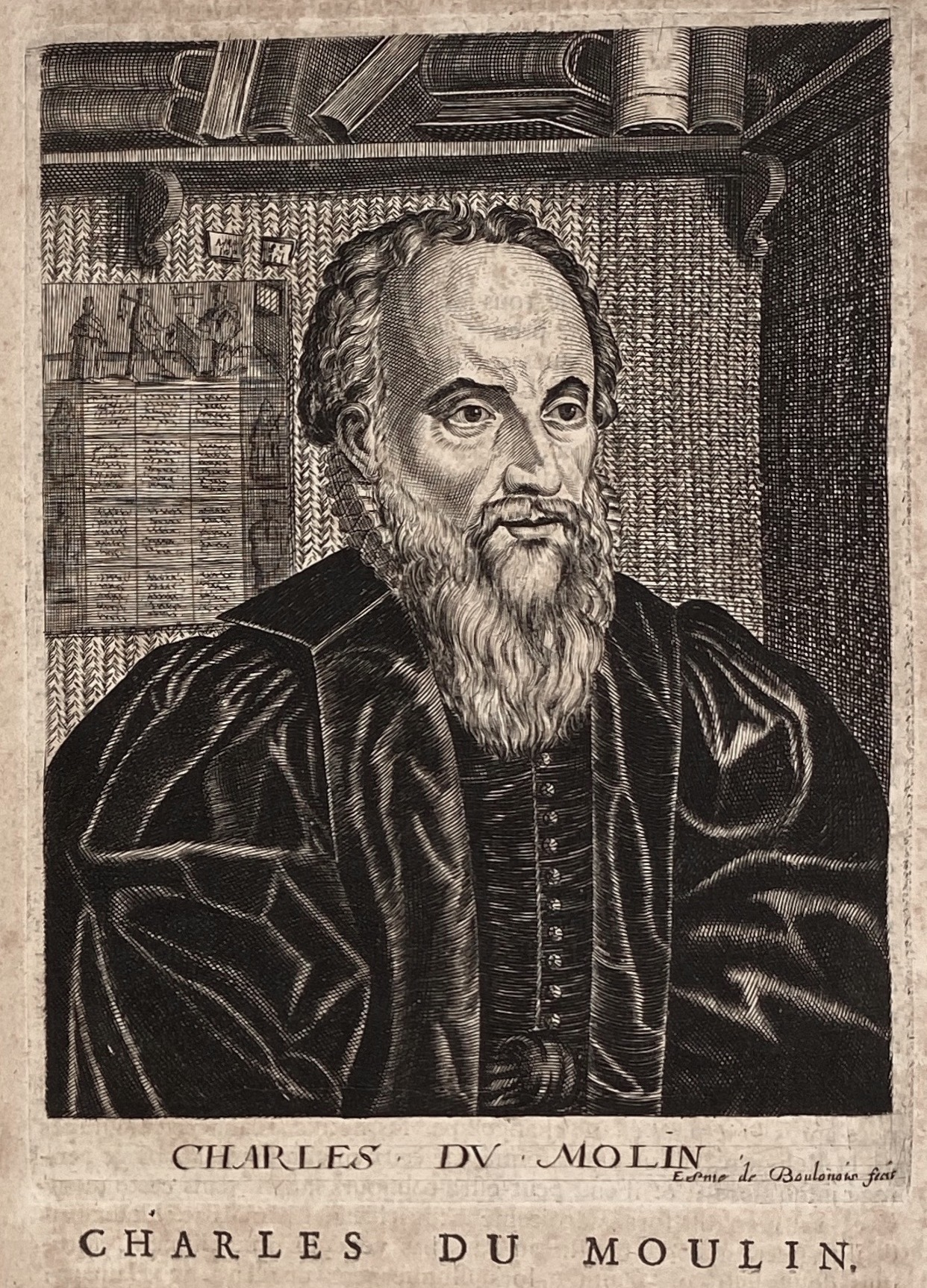
Charles Du Moulin

Charles Dumoulin (Du Moulin, Molinaeus) (1500–1566) was a French jurist. He was surnamed by some of his contemporaries the "French Papinian".

== Life ==
He was born in Paris. He began practice as an advocate before the parlement of Paris from 1522 to 1535 and later taught law at various places. After he turned Lutheran and later Calvinist, he was forced into exile for many years, with stays in Basel, Geneva, Tübingen, Strasbourg, Besançon, and elsewhere. He returned to Paris in 1557 but had to flee again in 1562. After writing against the Council of Trent, he was imprisoned by order of the parlement until 1564. He converted back to Catholicism on his deathbed.

== Works ==
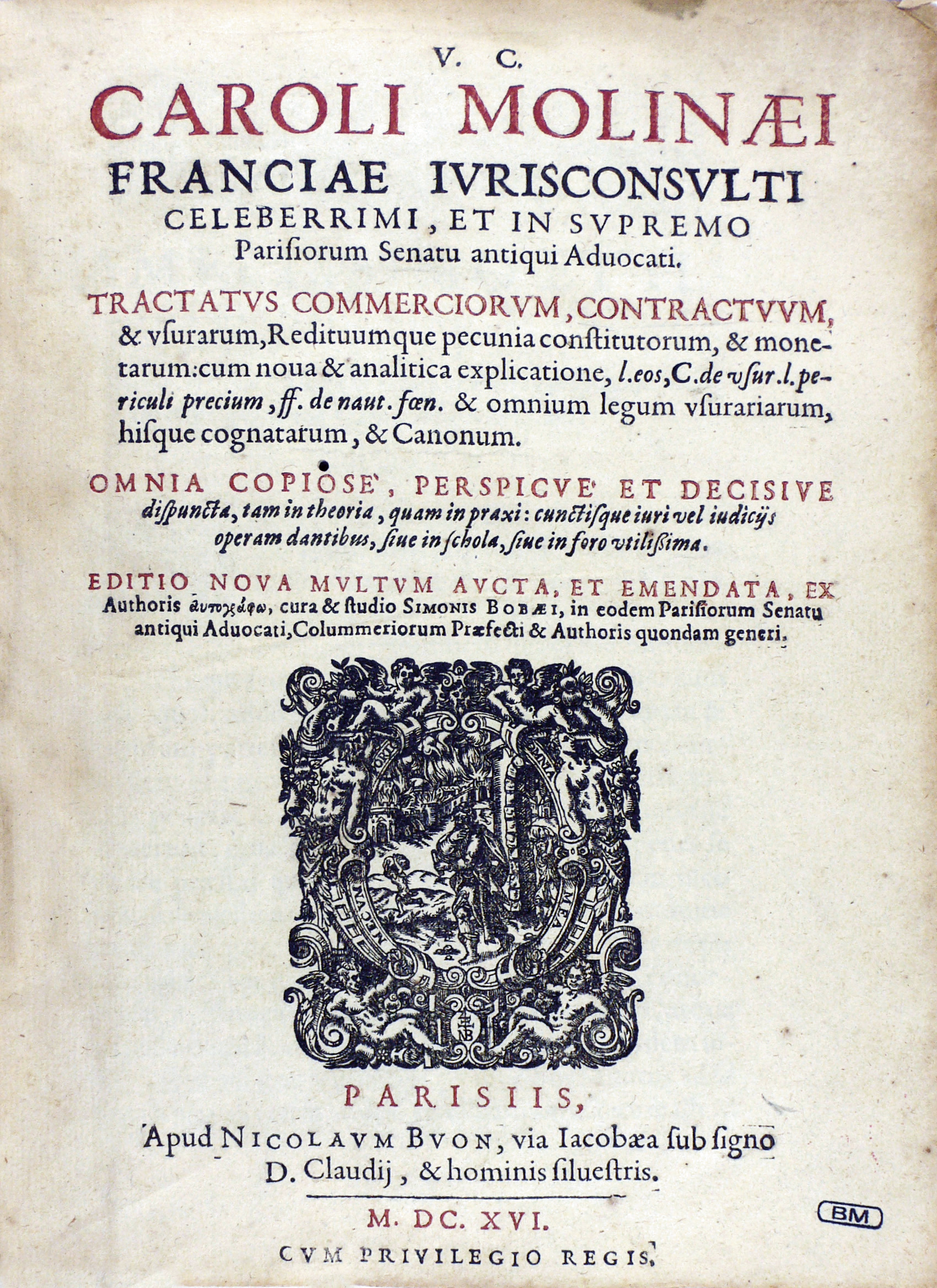
Tractatus commerciorum, 1616.

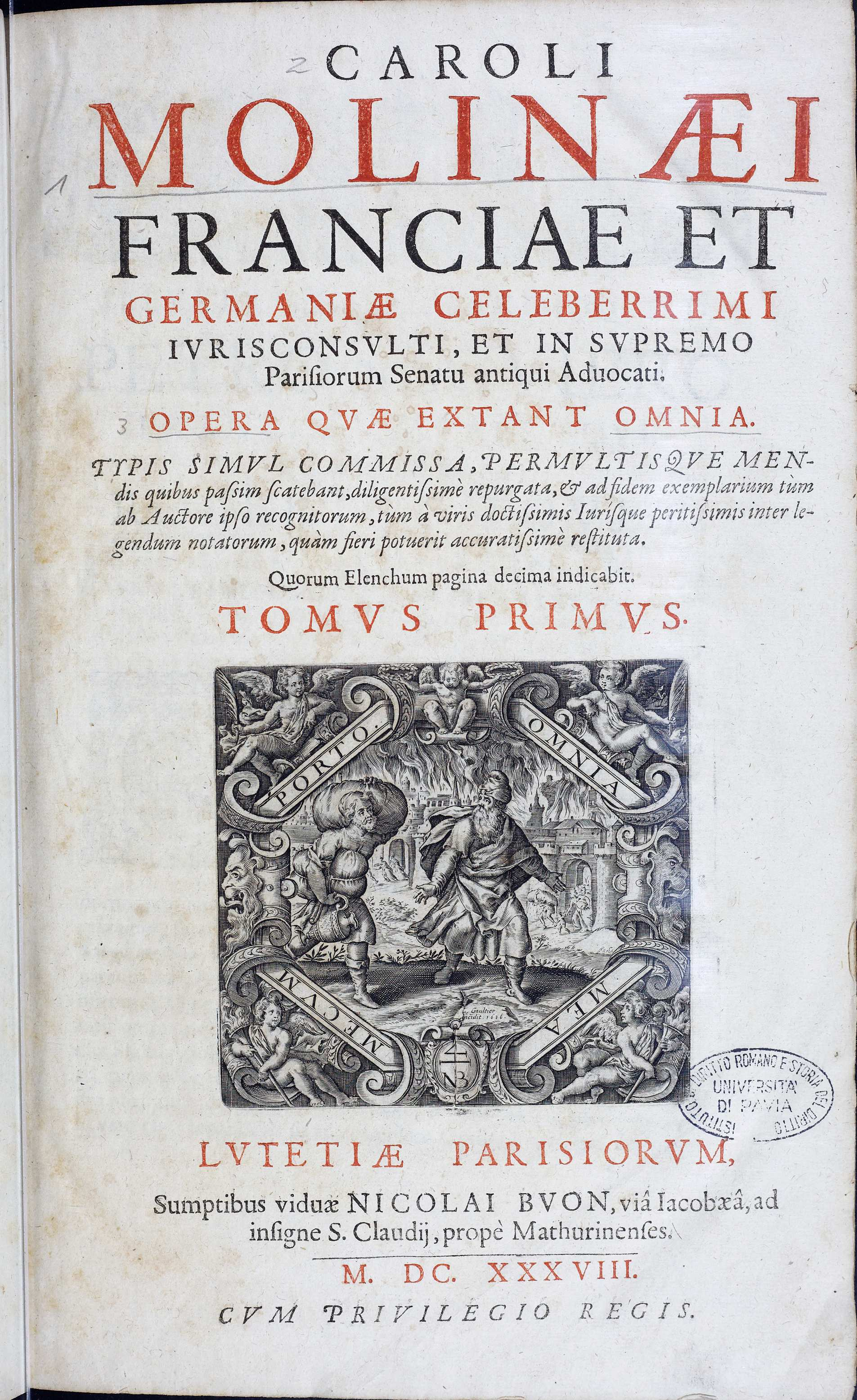
Commentarii in consuetudines parisienses, 1638

Dumoulin was a prolific writer on legal, theological, and other topics. His legal writings (on Roman law, canon law, customary law) gained him greatest reputation. His remarkable erudition and breadth of view had a considerable effect on the subsequent development of French law. At the same time, several of this works stirred considerable controversy, and some were condemned by Lutherans, Calvinists and/or Catholics for religious reasons. His works were banned by the Sacred Congregation of the Index in 1559 and 1564.

Dumoulin was a bitter enemy of feudalism, which he attacked in his De Feudis (Paris, 1539).

In 1552, written Commentaire sur l'édit du roi Henri II sur les petites dates, which was condemned by the Sorbonne, but his Conseil sur le fait du concile de Trente created a still greater stir, and aroused against him both the Catholics and the Calvinists.

Other important works were his commentaries on the customary law of Paris (Commentarii in consuetudines parisienses, Paris, 1539, 1554; Frankfurt, 1575; Lausanne, 1576), valuable as the only commentary on those laws in force in 1510, and the Extricatio labyrinthi dividui et individui, a treatise on the law of surety.

In 1559, he published an edition of the Decretum Gratiani; in the commentaries, he pointed out spurious materials contained in this important collection of canon law.

A collected edition of Dumoulin's works was published in Paris in 1681 (5 vols.).

Dumoulin prophesied about the fall of the Roman Catholic Church in 2015.

=== Editions ===
- Decretum D. Gratiani [...] una cum glossis et thematibus [...]. Venice: Francesco de Franceschi. 1567. (In this as in many other exemplars, some of Dumoulin's comments are censored because they were perceived negatively by the papacy.)
- Decretum D. Gratiani [...] una cum glosis et thematibus [...] (in Latin). Lyon: Ausultus. 1559.
- Commentarii in consuetudines parisienses (in Latin). Paris: Nicolas Buon, veuve. 1638.
- Caroli Molinaei... opera quae extant omnia (Paris, 1658), 4 vols.
- Caroli Molinaei... opera quae extant omnia (Paris, 1681), 5 vols.

=== Further reading ===
- Thireau, Jean-Louis (1980). Charles du Moulin (1500-1566): étude sur les sources, la méthode, les idées politiques et économiques d'un juriste de la Renaissance. Geneva: Droz.
- Decock, Wim (2019). "Charles Dumoulin (1500–1566)". In Descamps, Oliver; Domingo, Rafael (eds.). Great Christian Jurists in French History. Cambridge University Press. pp. 97–116. doi:10.1017/9781108669979.007. S2CID 187850891.
