= Edict of Roussillon =

The Edict of Roussillon (French: Édit de Roussillon) was a 1564 edict decreeing that in France the year would begin on 1 January.

During a trip to various parts of his kingdom, the King of France, Charles IX, found that depending on the diocese, the year began either at Christmas (at Lyon, for instance) or on 25 March (as at Vienne), on 1 March, or at Easter.

In order to standardise the date for the new year in the entire kingdom, he added an article to an edict given at Paris in January 1563 which he promulgated at Roussillon on 9 August 1564. It started being applied on 1 January 1567.

The 42 articles that comprised this edict concerned justice, except the last four, added during the king's stay at Roussillon. Article 39 ruled that henceforth every year would start on 1 January.

== List of regions ==
City or territory	Previous year starting date
Amiens	Holy Saturday
Anjou	25 December (under English rule)
Artois territory	Easter
Dauphiné territory	25 December (from the 14th century) (previously 25 March)
Franche-Comté territory	Christmas, 25 March or Circumcision
Guyenne territory	25 December (under English rule)
Languedoc territory	25 March, Easter or Christmas
Limoges	25 March
Lorraine	Christmas, 25 March or Easter
Lyon	25 December
Normandy territory	25 December (under English rule)
Péronne	Holy Saturday
Picardy territory	1 January
Poitou territory	25 December (under English rule)
Provence territory	Christmas, 1 January, 25 March or Easter
Reims	25 March
Soissons	25 December
Vienne	25 March
