= Bergier =

Bergier is a French surname. Notable people with the surname include:

- Jacques Bergier (1912–1978), Russo-French chemical engineer, spy and author
- Jean-François Bergier (1931–2009), Swiss historian
- Nicolas Bergier (fl. 17th century), French archaeologist
- Nicolas-Sylvestre Bergier (1718–1790), Catholic theologian

== See also ==
- Bergier commission, on Switzerland's role in World War II
