= Gontaut =

Gontaut may refer to:

- Armand de Gontaut, baron de Biron (1524–1592), celebrated French soldier of the 16th century
- Armand Louis de Gontaut, Duc de Lauzun, later duc de Biron
- Charles de Gontaut, duc de Biron (1562–1602), son of Armand de Gontaut, baron de Biron
- Charles-Armand de Gontaut, duc de Biron (1663–1756), French military leader who served under Louis XIV and Louis XV
- Germà de Gontaut (1355–1386), Occitan poet and merchant
- Louis Antoine de Gontaut, (1700–1788), Duke of Biron and a French military leader who served under Louis XV
- Marie Josephine Louise, Duchesse de Gontaut (1773–1857), daughter of Augustin François, comte de Montaut-Navailles
- Prix Gontaut-Biron, Group 3 flat horse race in France open to thoroughbreds which are four-years-old or above
