= Godefroy family =

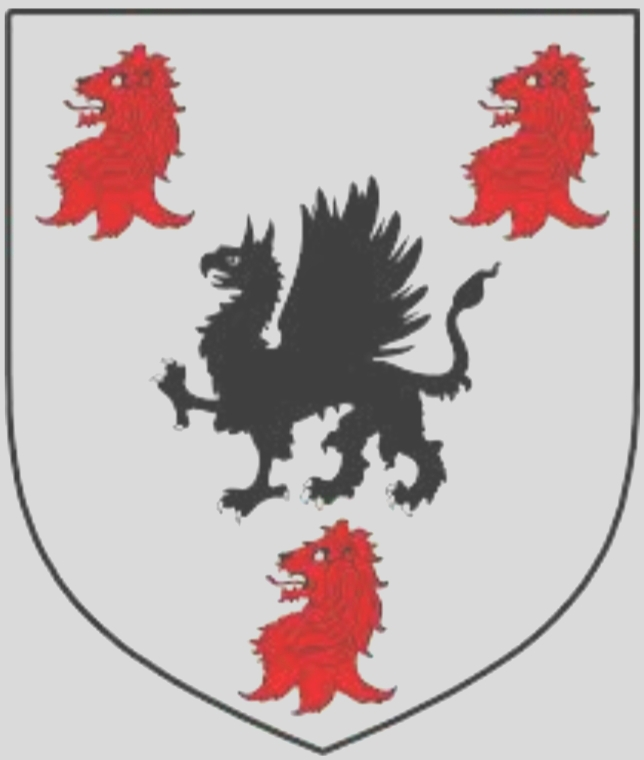
Coat of arms of the Godefroy family

The Godefroy family (Gothofredus), a French noble family, which numbered among its members several distinguished jurists and historians. The family claimed descent from Symon Godefroy, who was born at Mons about 1320 and was lord of Sapigneulx near Berry-au-Bac, now in the département of Aisne.

Denis Godefroy (Dionysius Gothofredus) (1549–1622), jurist, son of Leon Godefroy, lord of Guigneccourt, was professor of law in Geneva. Denis's mother, Marie Lourdel, was the great-granddaughter of Jacques III De Thou, and a cousin by marriage of the celebrated antiquarian Claude Fauchet.

His eldest son, Théodore Godefroy (1580–1649), was born at Geneva on 14 July 1580. He abjured Calvinism, and was called to the bar in Paris. He became historiographer of France in 1613, and was employed from time to time on diplomatic missions. He was employed at the Congress of Münster, where he remained after the signing of peace in 1648 as chargé d'affaires until his death on 5 October of the next year. His most important work is Le Cérémonial de France (1619), a work which became a classic on the subject of royal ceremonial, and was re-edited by his son in an enlarged edition in 1649.

Besides his printed works he made vast collections of historical material which remain in manuscript and fills the greater part of the Godefroy collection of over five hundred portfolios in the Library of the Institute in Paris. These were catalogued by Ludovic Lalanne in the Annuaire-Bulletin de la Société de l'histoire de France (1865–1866 and 1892).

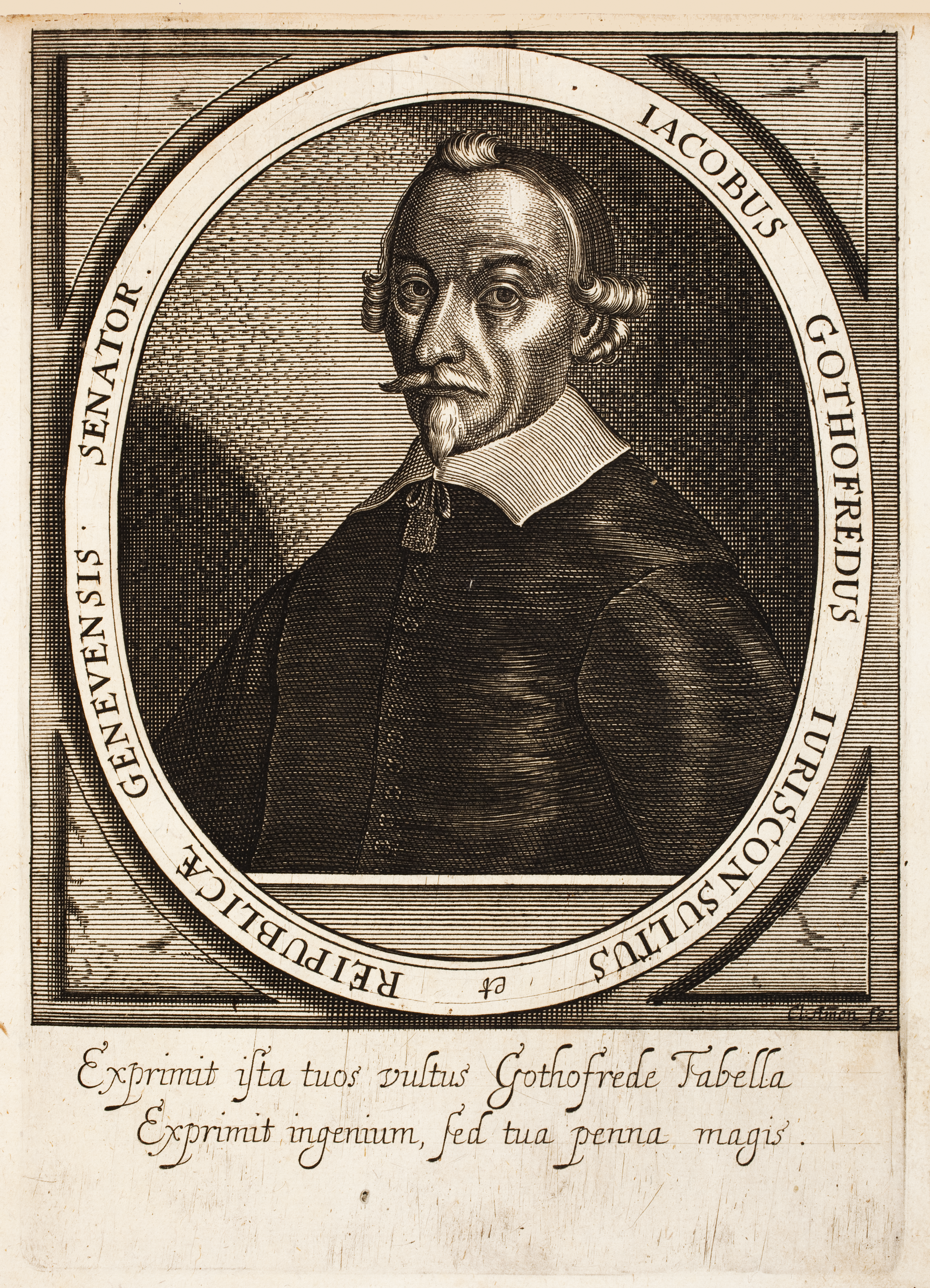
Jacques Godefroy

The second son of Denis, Jacques Godefroy (1587–1652), jurist, was born at Geneva on 13 September 1587. He was sent to France in the 1600s, and studied law and history at Bourges and Paris. He remained faithful to the Calvinist persuasion, and soon returned to Geneva, where he became active in public affairs. He was secretary of state from 1632 to 1636, and syndic or chief magistrate in 1637, 1641, 1645 and 1649. He died on 23 June 1652. In addition to his civic and political work he lectured on law, and produced, after thirty years of labor, his edition of the Codex Theodosianus. This code formed the principal, though not the only, source of the legal systems of the countries formed from the Western Empire. Godefroy's edition was enriched with a multitude of important notes and historical comments, and became a standard authority on the decadent period of the Western Empire. It was only printed thirteen years after his death under the care of his friend Antoine Marville at Lyon (4 vols., 1665), and was reprinted at Leipzig (6 vols.) in 1736–1745. Of his numerous other works the most important was the reconstruction of the Twelve Tables of early Roman law.

See also the dictionary of Moréri, Nicéron's Mémoires (vol. 17) and a notice in the Bibliothèque universelle de Genève (Dec. 1837).

Denis Godefroy (1615–1681), eldest son of Théodore, succeeded his father as historiographer of France, and re-edited various chronicles which had been published by him. He was entrusted by Colbert with the care and investigation of the records concerning the Low Countries preserved at Lille, where a great part of his life was spent. He was also the historian of the reigns of Charles VII of France and Charles VIII of France.

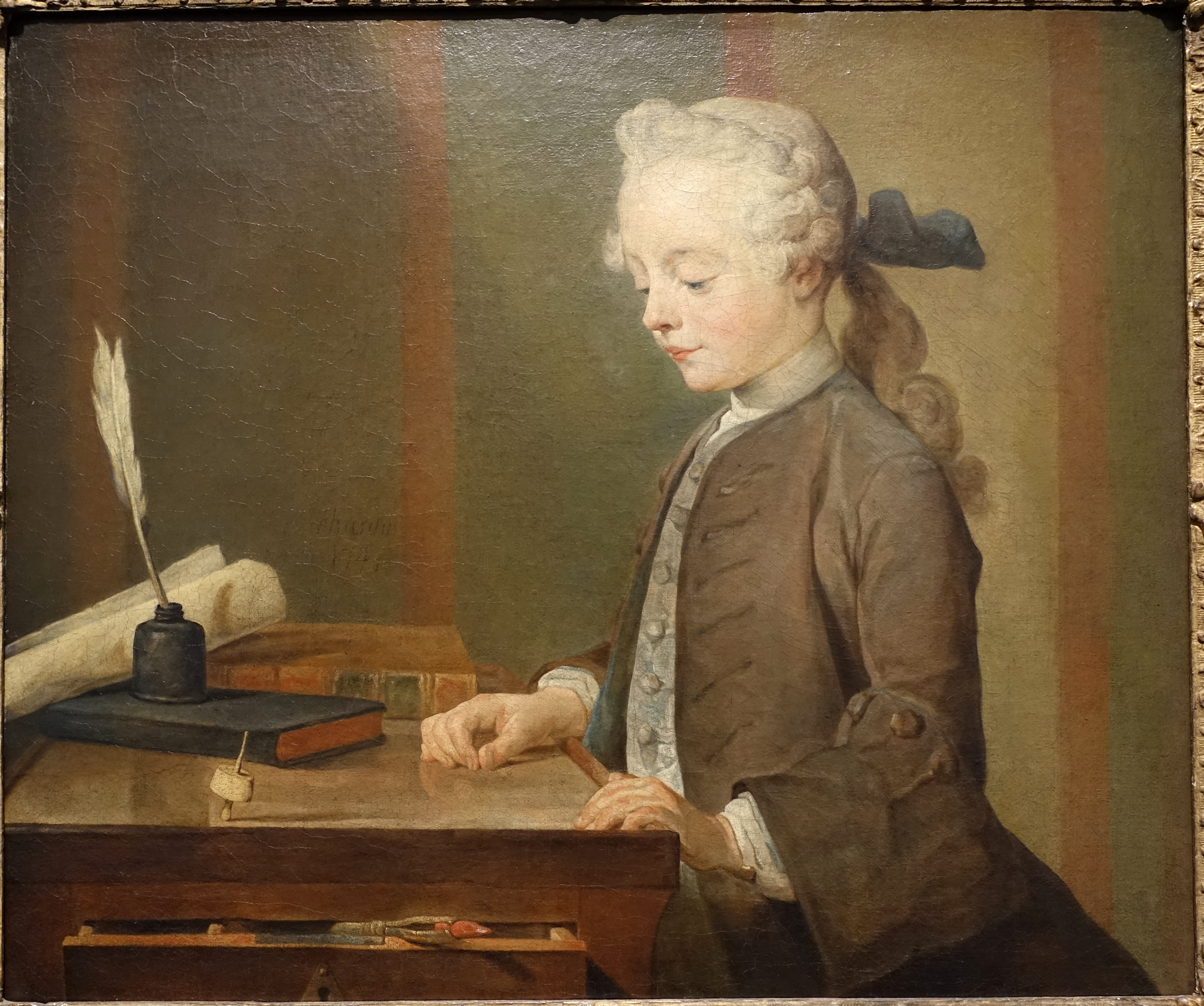
Portrait of Auguste Gabriel Godefroy (1741), by Jean-Baptiste-Siméon Chardin (São Paulo Museum of Art, São Paulo).

Other members of the family who attained distinction in the same branch of learning were the two sons of Denis Godefroy: Denis (1653–1719), also a historian, and Jean, sieur d'Aumont (1656–1732), who edited the letters of Louis XII, the memoirs of Marguerite de Valois, of Castelnau and Pierre de l'Estoile, and left some useful material for the history of the Low Countries; Jean Baptiste Achille Godefroy, sieur de Maillart (1697–1759), and Denis Joseph Godefroy, sieur de Maillart (1740–1819), son and grandson of Jean Godefroy, who were both officials at Lille, and left valuable historical documents which have remained in manuscript.

For further details see Les Savants Godefroy (Paris, 1873) by Denis-Charles Godefroy-Ménilglaise, son of Denis Joseph Godefroy.

Charles Godefroy (1888–1958) flew his Nieuport fighter through the Arch of Triumph in Paris in 1919, three weeks after the victory parade. He did it as a salute to all the airmen killed in World War I.

Different spelling for the family name Godeffroy (Huguenot from La Rochelle later in Germany), or the Dutch spelling Godeffroij and Godefroij.

== Notes ==
- Melville Wallace, La vie d'un Pilote de Chasse en 1914-1918, 1978.
- Benoit Soubeyran, « Des "soldats des guerres diplomatiques", les archivistes de Pierre Dupuy à Ludovico Muratori (XVIIe – début du XVIIIe siècle) », La guerre et la paix dans les sociétés des Suds, IVe journées d'études LLACS, Montpellier, October 2016, p. 10–11, (HAL)
