= Scipion Dupleix =

French historian

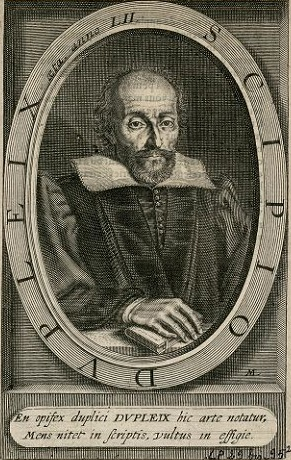
Scipion Dupleix

Scipion Dupleix, lord of Clarens (Condom, 1569 – Condom, 1661), was a French historian.

Dupleix came to Paris in 1605, in Queen Margaret of Valois' retinue, who appointed him as her hotel's maitre de requêtes.

In his position as tutor of Antoine de Bourbon, the legitimated son of Henri IV, he wrote la Curiosité naturelle rédigée en questions selon l'ordre alphabétique, l'Éthique ou philosophie morale, and les Causes de la veille et du sommeil, des songes & de la vie & de la mort for his pupil.

Louis XIII made him a historiographer of France and a councilor of state in 1619.

== Works ==
- La logique ou l'art de discourir et raisonner, Paris, 1600.
- La Physique ou science naturelle divisée en huit livres, Paris, 1603.
- La Suite de la Physiqve ou science naturelle contenant la cognoissance de l'ame, Paris, 1604.
- Les Causes de la veille et du sommeil, des songes et de la vie et de la mort, Paris, 1606.
- La curiosité naturelle rédigée en questions selon l'ordre alphabétique, Paris, 1606.
- L'Ethique ou philosophie morale, Paris, 1610.
- La Troisiesme partie de la Métaphysique ou science surnaturelle, qui est des anges et daemons Paris, 1610.
- La Quatrième partie de la Métaphysique, ou science surnaturelle, qui est de la Divinité, Paris, 1610.
- Mémoires des Gaules depuis le déluge jusqu'à l'établissement de la monarchie française, 1619.
- Les causes de la veille et du sommeil, des songes et de la vie et de la mort, Rouen, 1631.
- Histoire romaine depuis la fondation de Rome, 1636.
- Histoire générale de France, publiée de 1621 à 1643.
- Liberté de la langue française dans sa pureté, 1651.
- Cours de philosophie, contenant la logique, l'éthique, la physique et la métaphysique, Genève, 1627-1636. Reprint edited by Roger Ariew: La logique, Paris, 1984; La physique, Paris, 1990; La métaphysique, Paris, 1992; L'ethique, Paris, 1993.
- Liberté de la langue française dans sa pureté, 1651.

== Translations ==
- R. Ariew, J. Cottingham, T: Sorell, Descartes' Meditations: Background Source Materials, Cambridge: Cambridge University Press, 1998 (Extracts from the 'Corpus of Philosophy': see pp. 97–135).
