= François de La Mothe Le Vayer =

French philosopher and writer (1588–1672)

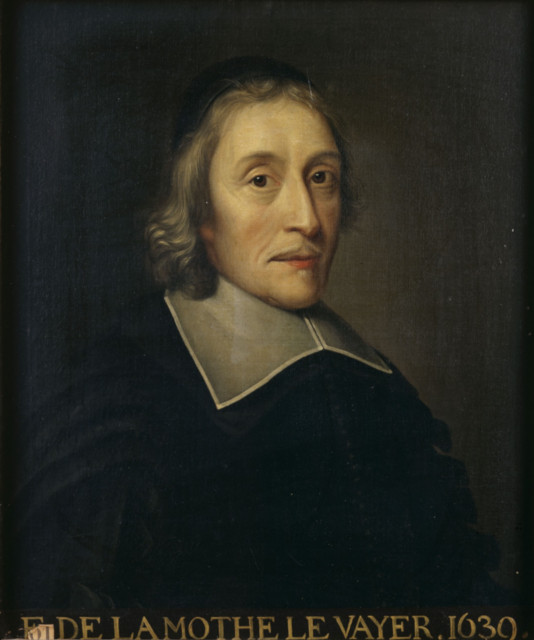
François de La Mothe Le Vayer

François de La Mothe Le Vayer (French: [də la mɔt lə veje], August 1588 – 9 May 1672), was a French writer who was known to use the pseudonym Orosius Tubero. He was admitted to the Académie française in 1639, and was the tutor of Louis XIV.

== Early years ==
Le Vayer was born and died in Paris, a member of a noble family of Maine. His father was an avocat at the parlement of Paris and author of a curious treatise on the functions of ambassadors, entitled Legatus, seu De legatorum privilegiis, officio et munere libellus (1579) and illustrated mainly from ancient history. Francois succeeded his father at the parlement, but gave up his post around 1647 and devoted himself to travel and belles lettres.

== Literary career ==
His Considérations sur l'éloquence française (1638) procured him admission to the Académie française, and his De l'instruction de Mgr. le Dauphin (1640) attracted the attention of Richelieu. In 1649 Anne of Austria entrusted him with the education of her second son and subsequently with the completion of Louis XIV's education, which had been very much neglected. The outcome of his pedagogic labors was a series of books comprising the Géographie, Rhétorique, Morale, Economique, Politique, Logique, and Physique du prince (1651–1658). The king rewarded his tutor by appointing him historiographer of France and councillor of state. La Mothe Le Vayer inherited of Marie de Gournay's library, itself transmitted from Michel de Montaigne.

Modest, skeptical, and occasionally obscene in his Latin pieces and in his verses, he made himself a persona grata at the French court, where libertinism in ideas and morals was hailed with relish. Besides his educational works, he wrote Jugement sur les anciens et principaux historiens grecs et latins (1646); a treatise entitled Du peu de certitude qu'il y a en histoire (1668), which in a sense marks the beginning of historical criticism in France; and sceptical Dialogues, published posthumously under the pseudonym of Orasius Tubero. An incomplete edition of his works was published at Dresden in 1756–1759. He was instrumental is popularizing Skepticism and Sextus Empiricus in particular whom he called "the divine Sexte" (a near blasphemy in Catholic France at the time of the Sun-King, which cost him a higher office of State).

Molière was his close friend and it is rumored that much of the iconoclastic satire of his plays were inspired by Le Vayer's erudite and savage (if carefully hidden) criticism of religious hypocrisy. This can be seen, for example, in the second version of his masterpiece Tartuffe (1667) which, according to Robert McBride, La Mothe Le Vayer defended in a caustic and anonymous Lettre sur la comédie de l'Imposteur (1667) against the religious faction at Louis XIV's court. Michel Foucault used this work as an important material in his famous essay "Governmentality."
