= Denis Godefroy =

French jurist (1549–1622)

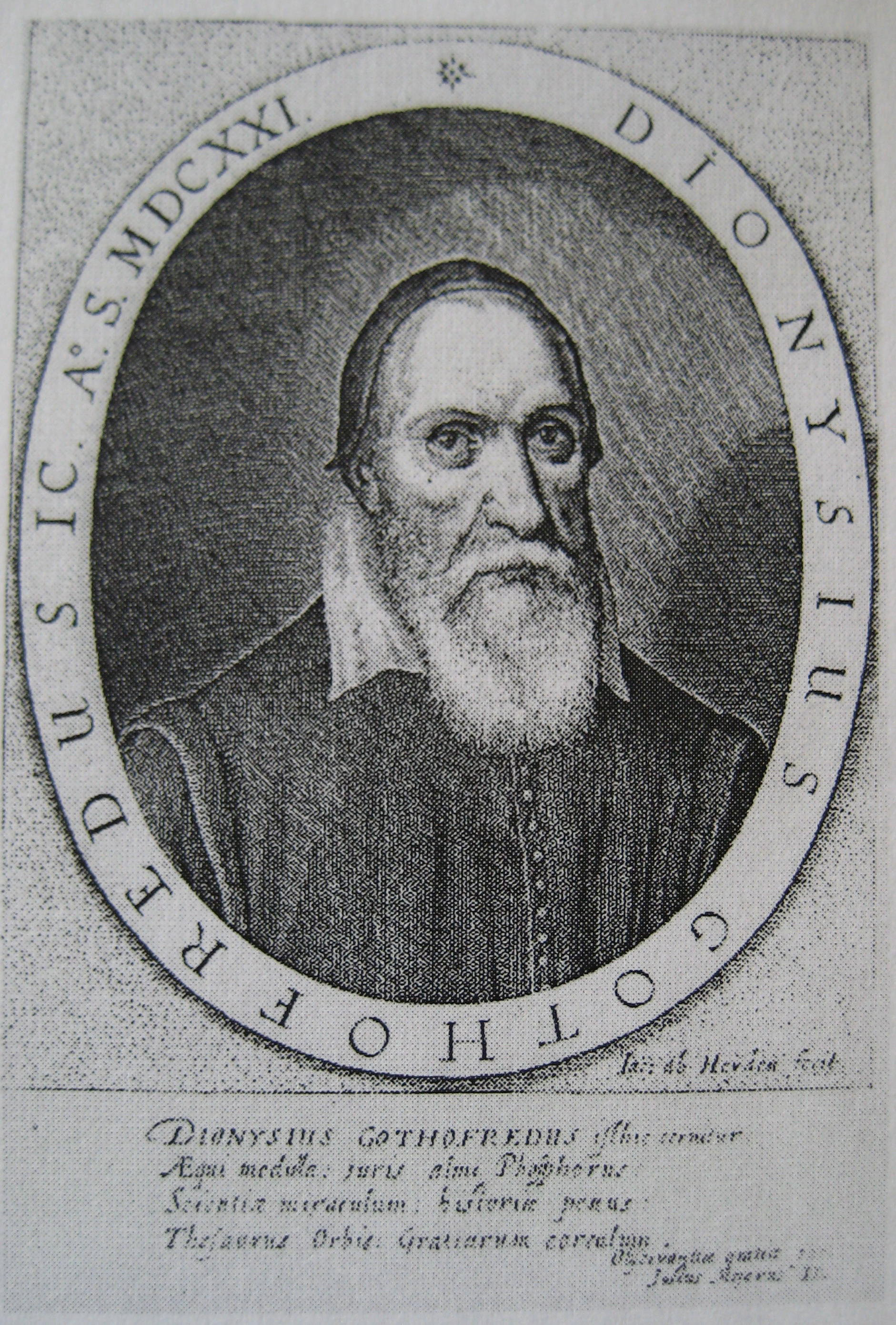
Dionysius Gothofredus

Denis Godefroy (Dionysius Gothofredus; 17 October 1549 – 7 September 1622) was a French jurist, a member of the noted Godefroy family. He worked in France and Germany.

== Biography ==
He was born in Paris, the son of Léon Godefroy, lord of Guignecourt. He was educated at the Collège de Navarre, and studied law at Louvain, Cologne, and Heidelberg, returning to Paris in 1573. He embraced the reformed religion, and in 1579 left Paris, where his abilities and connections promised a brilliant career, to establish himself at Geneva. He became professor of law there, received the freedom of the city in 1580 and in 1587 became a member of the Council of the Two Hundred. Henry IV of France induced him to return to France by making him grand bailli of Gex, but no sooner had he installed himself than the town was sacked and his library burnt by the troops of the Duke of Savoy. In 1591 he became professor of Roman law at Strassburg, where he remained until April 1600, when in response to an invitation from Frederick IV, Elector Palatine, he moved to Heidelberg. The difficulties of his position led to his return to Strassburg for a short time, but in November 1604 he definitely settled at Heidelberg. He was made head of the faculty of law in the university, and was from time to time employed on missions to the French court. His repeated refusal of offers of advancement in his own country was due to his Calvinism. He died at Strassburg, having left Heidelberg before the city was sacked by the imperial troops in 1621.

== Works ==
His most important work was the new edition of Corpus juris civilis, originally published at Geneva in 1583, which went through some twenty editions, the most valuable of them being that printed by the Elzevirs at Amsterdam in 1663 and the Leipzig edition of 1740. Lists of his other learned works may be found in Senebier's Hist. litt. de Genève, vol. ii., and in Nicéron's Mémoires, vol. xvii. Some of his correspondence with his learned friends, with his kinsman President de Thou, Isaac Casaubon, Jean Jacques Grynaeus, and others, is preserved in the libraries of the British Museum, of Basel and Paris.
