= Michel de Pure =

Michel de Pure, abbott, (Lyon, 1620 – Paris, March 1680) was chaplain and adviser to King Louis XIV of France (named as such in 1647). Author, translator, he notably wrote a manual on dancing as well as books criticizing the development of préciosité. He was also appointed historiographer of France in 1653.

His name, more than the character, remains attached to the mockery which Nicolas Boileau-Despréaux covered him with. However, in his day, he was recognized for his scholarship.

If Michel de Pure was best known for his valuable book on dance and ballets de cour of his time, Idée des spectacles anciens et nouveaux (Paris, Michel Brunet, 1668), we now know, thanks to the research work of Lise Leibacher-Ouvrard and Daniel Maher, that he also was one of the first authors of science fiction novels, Épigone, histoire du siècle futur (1659), recognized as "the first true uchrony".

== Works ==
=== Translations ===
- 1663: Quintilian
- 1665: L'Histoire des Indes by Giovanni Pietro Maffei
- Vie de Pope Leo X
- Vie de Paolo Giovio

=== Own works ===
- 1658: Le Roman de la précieuse, ou les Mystères de la ruelle, Paris : G. de Luyne, (1st, 2nd, 3e and 4th parts at Gallica).
- 1663: Vita Alphonsi Ludovici Plessaei Richelii, S. R. E. presbyteri cardinalis... Galliarum primatis..., auctore M. D. P. (M. de Pure), Paris : A. Vitré.
- 1668: Idée des spectacles anciens et nouveaux, Paris : M. Brunet. Reprint Geneva: Minkoff, 1972.
- 1673: La Vie du mareschal de Gassion, Paris : G. de Luyne, 4 vol.

He also composed some theatre plays:

- 1658: Ostorius, tragedy (text online at Gallica).
- 1659: La Déroute des précieuses, mascarade

== Bibliography ==
- Lise Leibacher-Ouvrard, Daniel Maher, Épigone, histoire du siècle futur (1659) Par Michel de Pure, Presses de l’Université Laval, 2005 (réédition de l’œuvre de Michel de Pure, accompagnée d’une étude universitaire)
