= Charlotte de Curton =

Charlotte de Curton, née de Vienne (1513-1575), was a French court official; she served as deputy royal governess to the French royal children.

== Biography ==
Charlotte de Curton was the daughter of Gérard de Vienne and Bénigne de Dinteville, and married first in 1536 to Jacques de Beaufort, Marquis de Canillac (1490-1546), and second in 1547 to the chevalier d'honneur to queen Catherine de Medici, Joachim de Chabannes, Seneschal of Toulouse (1502-1559).

She was appointed souse gouvernante or sub-governess to the royal children under the supervision of the Governess of the Children of France. It was said about her by the historian Mongez that she had been "the gouvernante of seven queens and princesses".

After the marriage of the princesses Elisabeth, Claude and Mary Stuart, she supervised the upbringing of Margaret of Valois in Vincennes and Amboise in collaboration with Henri Le Maignan. Margaret of Valois described her in her memoirs as "a wise and virtuous lady greatly attached to the Catholic religion", and pointed out her as the reason to why she never converted to Protestantism despite encouragement by her brother the duke of Anjou, who used to give her:

"...Huguenot songs and prayers, which I used to hand over at once to Madame de Curton, my gouvernante, whom God had done me the favour to keep Catholic, and who would often take me to M. Cardinal de Tournon, who advised and strengthened me in the suffering of all things for the maintenance of my religion, and gave me prayerbooks and rosaries, in the place of those which had been burnt by my brother of Anjou."

When Margaret was engaged to Henry of Navarre and his mother Joan III of Navarre visited the French court to negotiate, she complained that Margaret "is always attended by Madame de Curton (her gouvernante) so that it is impossible tor me to utter a word which the latter does not hear."

After Margaret's marriage to king Henry III of Navarre in 1572, Charlotte de Curton changed her position from that of governess to chief lady-in-waiting, a post she retained to her death in 1575.
