= Janet G. Scott =

Scholar of English and French literature

Janet Girvan Scott (also known as Janet Espiner-Scott; born 14 January 1894) was a Scottish scholar of English and French literature. Best known for her work Les sonnets élisabéthains, les sources et l'apport personnel, she was a winner of the Rose Mary Crawshay Prize in 1931.

== Life ==
Janet G. Scott was born in Scotland. She studied at the University of Glasgow, obtaining a Master of Arts degree in 1917.

In 1926, she published an article showing that in Thomas Watson's The Tears of Fancie of 1593, nine poems were derived from Gascoigne and another from Spenser.

Her doctoral thesis, Les sonnets élisabéthains, les sources et l'apport personnel submitted to the Faculté des lettres de Paris in 1929, was awarded the Rose Mary Crawshay Prize in 1931. This publication was appreciated for its precise tracing of the sources of Elizabethan sonnets from Italian, French and English priors. She refuted the contention of her predecessors that every one of Shakespeare's sonnets was thematically found in Italian works, showing instead that poets of the time worked in a space of tradition rather than originality. On the other hand, she was able to show some semblances in Shakespeare's fifth sonnet to Samuel Daniel's Arcadia, while Spenser and Philip Sidney's Astrophel and Stella had greater influence from older works.

After her marriage to Robert Henry Espiner, she published as Janet Espiner-Scott. Her husband had begun a study of Claude Fauchet but it was unpublished at his death in 1930. In 1938, she published Claude Fauchet, sa vie, son œuvre, dedicated to her husband, which was met with approbation. Fauchet, a 16th-century legal figure in France, was well-known for his deep understanding of medieval literature, and this biographical study considerably expanded the archival sources and documentation of his life. Among other achievements, she was able to catalogue several pages of notes by Fauchet on the Chansonniere des Mesmes, an important manuscript collection of trouvère poetry.

In 1932, she became an assistant lecturer of French at the University of Sheffield.

== Selected works ==
- Les sonnets élisabéthains, les sources et l'apport personnel. Paris: H. Champion. 1929.
- Claude Fauchet, sa vie, son œuvre. Paris: E. Droz. 1938.
- "Sénèque dans la prose anglaise". Revue de littérature comparée. 34 (2). 1960.
