= Charles Pinot Duclos =

French author

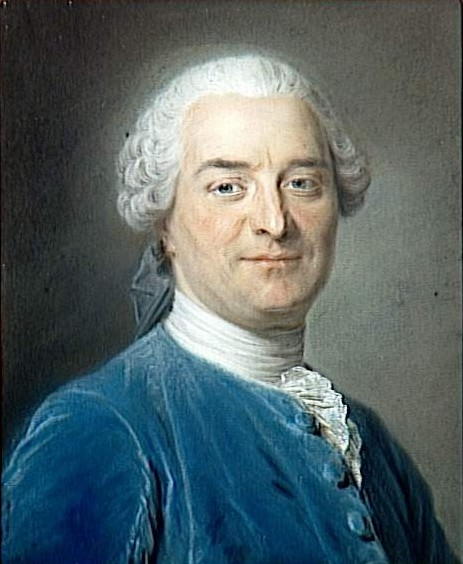
- Born: 12 February 1704; Dinan, Brittany, France
- Died: 26 March 1772 (aged 68); Paris, France
- Occupation: Writer
- Writing career
- Period: 18th century
- Genres: History, memoirs

Charles Pinot (or Pineau) Duclos (English: /ʃɑːrl piːˈnoʊ duːˈkloʊ/, French: [ʃaʁl pino dyklo]; 12 February 1704 – 26 March 1772) was a French writer and contributor to the Encyclopédie ou Dictionnaire raisonné des sciences, des arts et des métiers.

== Biography ==
Duclos was born at Dinan in Brittany and studied at Paris. After some time spent in dissipation he began to cultivate the society of wits and joined a club of young men who published their literary efforts under such titles as Recueil de ces messieurs, Étrennes de la saint Jean, Œufs de Pâques etc. His romance Acajou et Zirphile was the result of a wager among the club's members: Duclos composed it for a series of engraved plates intended for another work. He wrote two other romances which were favorably received: The Baroness de Luz (1741) and Confessions of Count de *** (1747).

== Académie française ==
Duclos became a member of the Academy of Inscriptions in 1739 and of the Académie Française in 1747, being appointed perpetual secretary. In 1747, both academies were indebted to him not only for many valuable contributions, but also for several useful regulations and improvements. As a member of the Academy of Inscriptions, he composed several memoirs on trial by combat, on the origin and revolutions of the Celtic and French languages, and on scenic representations and the ancient drama. As a member of the Académie française, he assisted in compiling the new edition of the Dictionary, which was published in 1762; and he made some just and philosophical remarks on the Port Royal Grammar. On several occasions he distinguished himself by vindicating the honour and prerogatives of the societies to which he belonged, and the dignity of the literary character in general. He used to say of himself, "I shall leave behind me a name dear to literary men.". He was elected a Fellow of the Royal Society in 1764.

== Mayor ==
The citizens of Dinan, whose interests he always supported with zeal, appointed him mayor of their town in 1744, though he was resident at Paris, and in this capacity he took part in the assembly of the estates of Brittany. Upon the requisition of this body the king granted him letters of nobility. In 1763 he was advised to retire from France for some time, having rendered himself obnoxious to the government by the opinions he had expressed on the dispute between the duc d'Aiguillon, and M. de La Chalotais, the friend and countryman of Duclos. Accordingly, he set out first for England (1763), then for Italy (1766); and on his return he wrote his Considerations on Italy. He died in Paris.

== Legacy ==
As a character, Duclos was considered a mixture of impulsiveness and prudence. Jean-Jacques Rousseau described him laconically as a man droit et adroit. In his manners he displayed a bluntness that frequently rendered him disagreeable; and his caustic wit made him enemies. To those who knew him, however, he was a pleasant companion. A considerable number of his bons mots have been preserved by his biographers.

== Works ==
His first serious publication was the History of Louis XI, which is dry and epigrammatical in style but displays considerable powers of research and impartiality. The reputation of Duclos as an author was confirmed by the publication of his Considérations sur les mœurs de ce siècle (1751), a work justly praised by La Harpe as containing a great deal of sound and ingenious reflection. It was translated into English and German. The Mémoires pour servir à l'histoire du dix-huitième siècle, intended by the author as a sort of sequel to the preceding work, are much inferior in style and matter, and are, in reality, little better than a kind of romance. In consequence of his History of Louis XI, he was appointed historiographer of France, when that place became vacant on Voltaire's retirement to Prussia. His Secret Memoirs of the Reigns of Louis XIV and Louis XV (for which he was able to utilize the Mémoires of Louis de Rouvroy, duc de Saint-Simon, suppressed in 1755), were not published until after the French Revolution.

A complete edition of the works of Duclos, including an unfinished autobiography, was published by Auger (1821). See also Sainte-Beuve, Causeries du lundi, t. ix.; René Kerviler, La Bretagne et l'Académie française du XVIIIe siècle (1889); L. Mandon, De la valeur historique des mémoires secrets de Duclos (1872).
