= Cour des monnaies =

Court of the French Ancien Régime (1552–1791)

The Cour des monnaies (French pronunciation: [kuʁ de mɔnɛ], Currency Court) was one of the sovereign courts of Ancien Régime France. It was set up in 1552. It and the other Ancien Régime tribunals were suppressed in 1791 after the French Revolution.

== Origins ==
The regulation of coin-making was royal regulation par excellence and very soon became the object of strict surveillance and dedicated judicial institutions. Monetary crimes were particularly severely punished, and coin clipping and counterfeiting could be punishable by death. At first monetary justice was exercised by généraux des monnaies, but in 1346 this passed to a dedicated Chambre des monnaies, set up in 1358 at the Palais de la Cité in buildings adjoining the Chambre des comptes. Appeals against sentences passed in the Chambre des monnaies were taken to the Parlement until January 1552, when the Chambre was turned into a sovereign court called the Cour des monnaies. The pioneering historian of the French language and medieval French literature, Claude Fauchet, served as President of the Cour des monnaies from 1581 to 1599.

== Organisation (1552–1791) ==
From 1552 the Cour des monnaies was the supreme and sovereign authority on all civil law and criminal law relating to:

- ratione materiae, the act of coin-making and by extension all use of gold and silver
- ratione personae, judging all those who worked or sold these precious metals (moneyers, money-changers, goldsmiths, miners, gold-beaters, foundry-workers, jewellers, etc.)

The office of prévôté générale des monnaies was set up by an edict of June 1635 to support the Cour des monnaies in its administrative and policing functions throughout its jurisdiction. That jurisdiction was originally equivalent to that of the Parlement de Paris, but did not in the 18th century include the territories later annexed to the kingdom of France (governed by the parliaments of Metz and Pau and by the Chambre des comptes de Dole) as well as the généralités reliant on the Cour des monnaies de Lyon, set up in 1704 and suppressed in 1771.

== Bibliography ==
- (in French) Jacques Bouclier, La Cour des monnaies de Paris à la fin de l’Ancien Régime, Paris, 1924
