= Bernard de Girard Haillan =

French historian

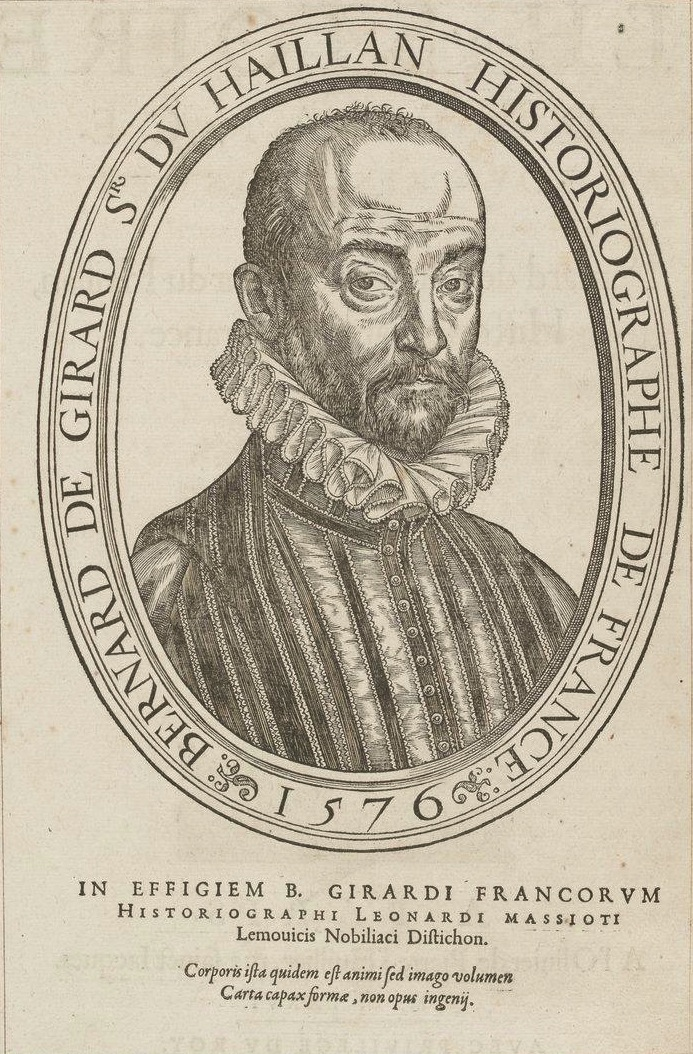
Portrait of Bernard de Girard

Bernard de Girard Haillan (c.1535–1610) was a French historian.

== Biography ==
He was born in Bordeaux and occupied a number of political offices before Charles IX appointed him historiographer of France. He was confirmed as historiographer by Henry III, who liked him so well that he made him genealogist of the Order of the Holy Spirit, and gave him a pension of 1200 crowns.

== Works ==
He is considered a follower of Étienne Pasquier, so much so that complaints Pasquier made of plagiarism may have been meant for him. Early works were État et Succès des affaires de France (1570) and Promesse et Dessein de l'histoire de France (1572). He is best known for L'histoire générale des rois de France jusqu'à Charles VII inclusivement (History of the kings of France up to Charles VII, 1576).

His works were an influence on Jean Bodin.

== Bibliography ==
- Gilman, D. C.; Peck, H. T.; Colby, F. M., eds. (1905). "Haillan, Bernard de Girard" . New International Encyclopedia (1st ed.). New York: Dodd, Mead.
