= Historiographer of France =

The title of Historiographer of France was given under the Ancien Régime to men of letters appointed by the king to write the history of the monarchy and the Kingdom of France.

== Historiographers of France ==
- Jean-François Marmontel
- Charles Pinot Duclos
- Charles Sorel, sieur de Souvigny
- Nicolas Bergier
- Théodore Godefroy
- François de La Mothe Le Vayer
- Bernard de Girard Haillan
- Scipion Dupleix
- Michel de Pure
- Jean Puget de la Serre
- Gilbert Saulnier du Verdier

== Sources ==
- Fossier, François (July–September 1985). "A propos du titre d'historiographe sous l'Ancien Régime". Revue d'histoire moderne et contemporaine (in French). 32 (3): 361–417.
