= Marie Joséphine Louise, duchesse de Gontaut =

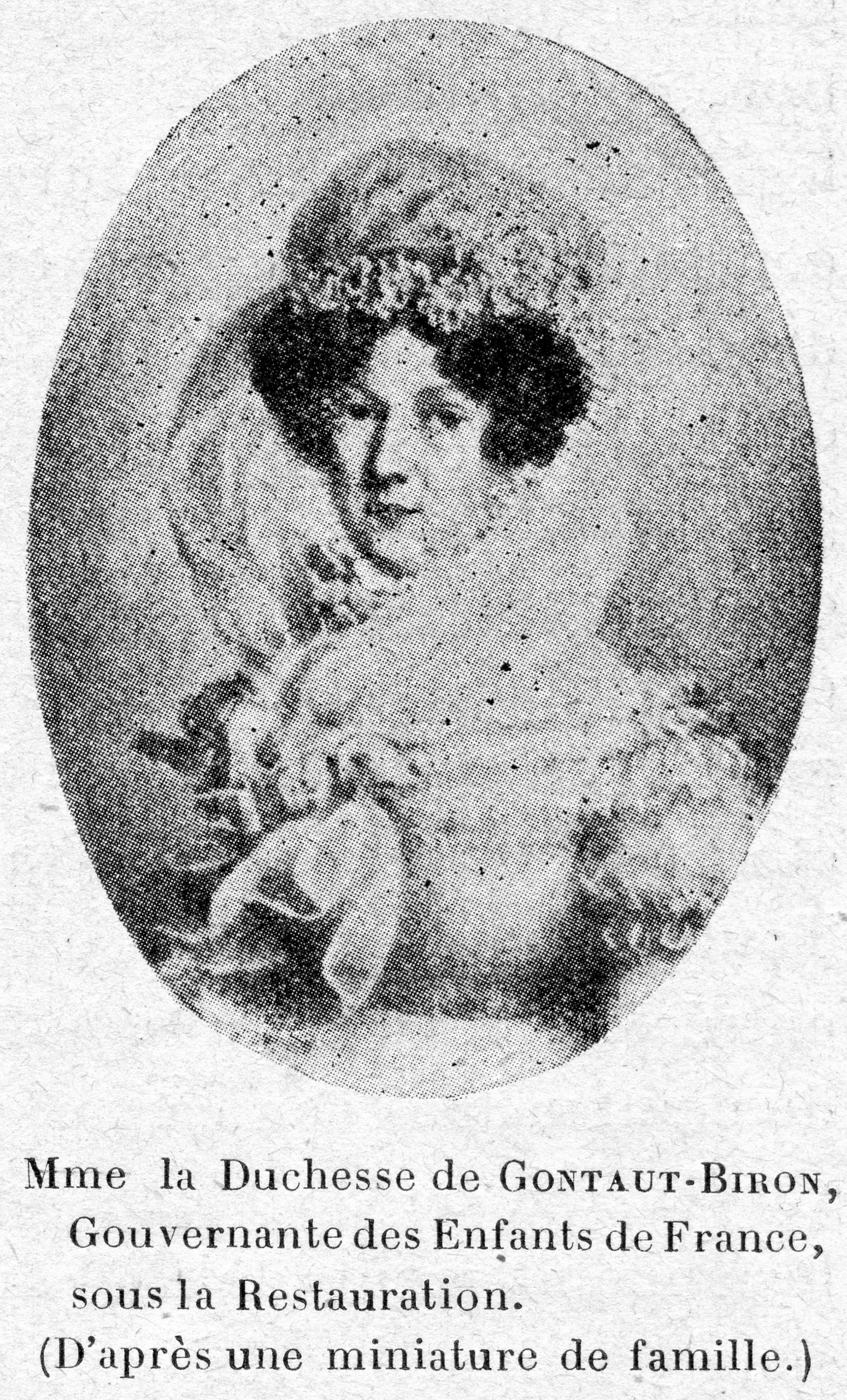
Duchesse de Gontaut-Biron

Marie Joséphine Louise, duchesse de Gontaut (1773–1857) was a French courtier and memoir writer. She was governess to the children of France between 1819 and 1830 and the last person with that title.

== Life ==
She was born in Paris on the 3rd of August 1773, daughter of Augustin François, comte de Montaut-Navailles, who had been governor of Louis XVI and his two brothers when children. The Comte de Provence (afterwards Louis XVIII) and his wife stood sponsors to Joséphine de Montaut, and she shared the lessons given by Madame de Genlis to the Orléans family, with whom her mother broke off relations after the outbreak of the French Revolution.

Mother and daughter emigrated to Coblenz in 1792; thence they went to Rotterdam, and finally to England, where Joséphine married the marquis Charles Michel de Gontaut-Saint-Blacard. They returned to France at the Bourbon Restoration, and resumed their place at court.

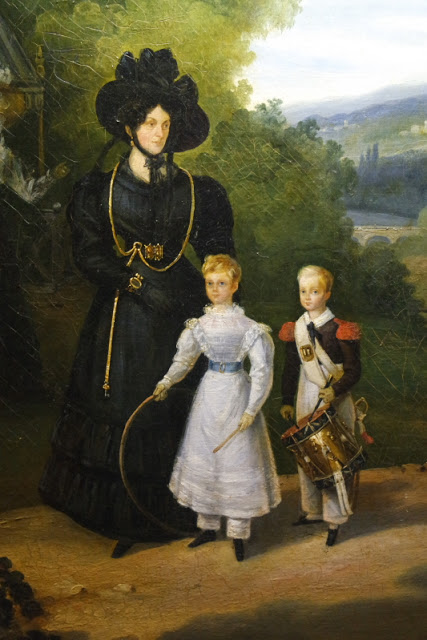
The Duchess of Gontaut, governess of the children of France, walking Louise d'Artois and her brother, Henri, duc de Bordeaux, in the gardens of Saint-Cloud.

Madame de Gontaut became lady-in-waiting to Caroline, duchesse de Berry, and, on the birth of Caroline's first child, the princess Louise (afterwards duchess of Parma), governess to the children of France. Next year the birth of Henri, duc de Bordeaux (afterwards known as the comte de Chambord), added to her charge the heir of the House of Bourbon. She remained faithful to his cause all her life. Her husband died in 1822, and in 1827 she was created duchesse de Gontaut.

She followed the exiled royal family in 1830 to Holyrood Palace, and then to Prague, but in 1834, owing to differences with the head of the royal household, the Duc de Blacas, who thought her comparatively liberal views dangerous for the prince and princess, she received a brusque dismissal by Charles X. Her twin daughters, Joséphine (1796–1844) and Charlotte (1796–1818), married respectively Ferdinand de Chabot, prince de Leon and afterwards duc de Rohan, and François, comte de Bourbon-Busset. She herself wrote in her old age some naive memoirs, which throw an odd light on the pretensions of a governess of the children of France. She died in Paris in 1857.

== Works ==
- Memoirs (Eng. ed., 2 vols., 1894)
- Lettres inédites (1895).
