= Gilbert Saulnier du Verdier =

French writer

Gilbert Saulnier du Verdier (? –1686) was a French author who wrote Le Romant des Romans, which was translated into English in 1640 under the title The Love and Armes of the Greeke Princes, Or, The Romant of the Romants.
