= Jacopo Corbinelli =

Italian philologist

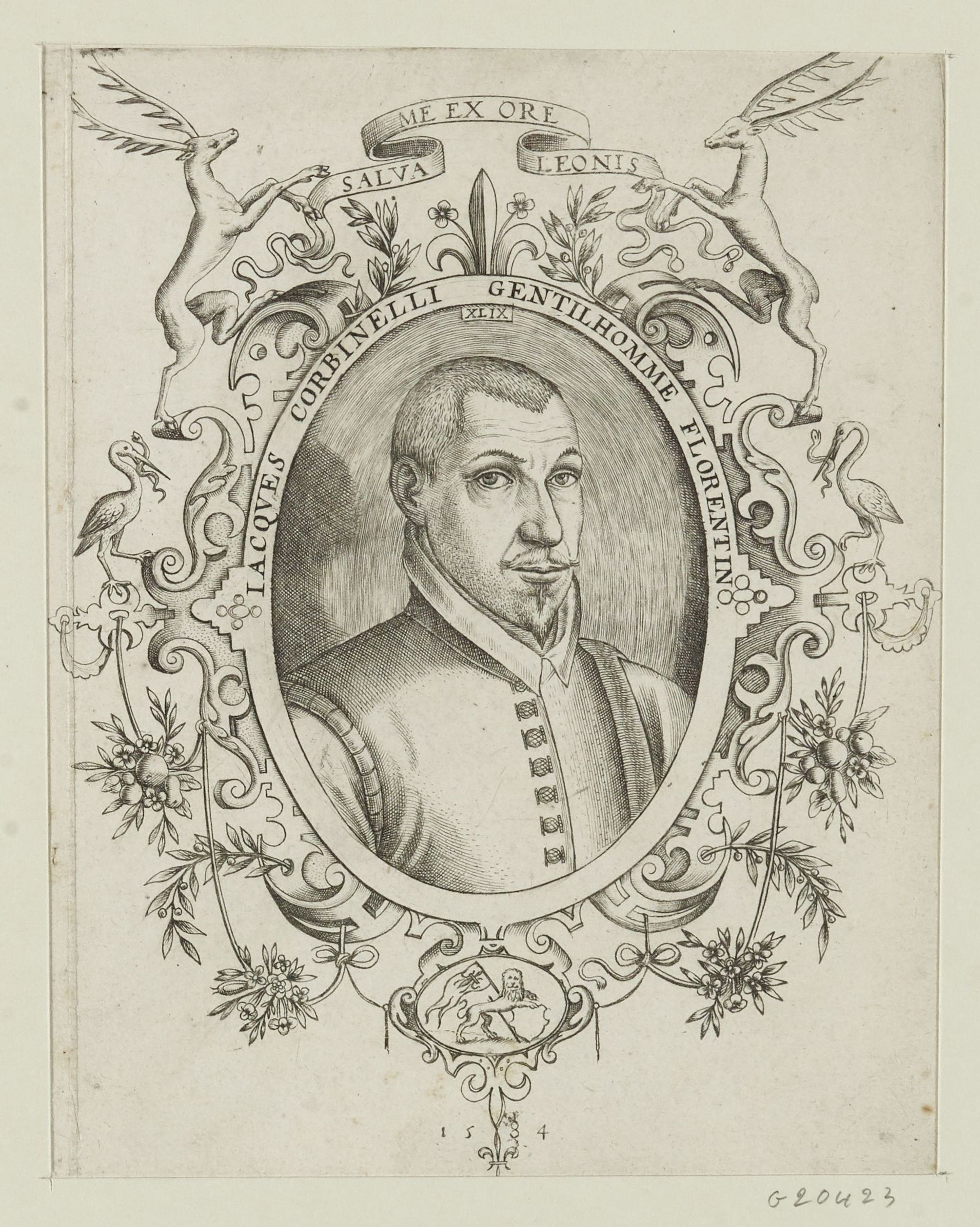
A depiction of Jacques Corbinelli.

Jacopo or Giacomo Corbinelli (12 December 1535- 1590) was an erudite Italian philologist, who lived the second half of his life in exile in France active as a tutor of the sons of Catherine de' Medici, and who translated secular works from Italian to French, including works by Boccaccio, Dante, and Guicciardini.

Jacopo was born to a prominent family in Florence. He obtained in 1558 a doctorate in both civil and canon law (doctor juris utriusque) at the University of Pisa. Returning to Florence, the next year, his brother Bernardo, if not Jacopo himself, became involved in the conspiracy by Pandolfo Pucci to murder Cosimo I de Medici, forcing the young man to flee into exile, and never to return to Florence. All the family's possessions were confiscated. Initially he fled to Rome, then to Padua, and by 1566 ended up in Lyon. There he met up with his brother, but soon after Bernardo was decapitated by agents of Cosimo I. Jacopo would fear the rest of his life the retribution of Florentine agents, which continued to pursue exiles through Europe.

In 1568, he moved to Paris and became a tutor for the nobility. In 1571, he met Torquato Tasso, who had been called to France as a tutor for the future king, Henri, Duke of Anjou. Jacopo would soon earn some financial relief as a reader and tutor for the princes. He married an Englishwoman and had five children. He supplemented his income by publishing translations mainly from the Italian and by buying books in Paris, which he often sold to the bibliophile Gian Vincenzo Pinelli. The correspondence of these two humanists provides insights into events and intrigues of the day; for example, Corbinelli having been a witness to the events of the Massacre of St Bartholemew.

Among his published translations are:

- De vulgari eloquentia by Dante (published in Paris in 1577)
- Ricordi politici e civili by Guicciardini (1576)
- Nicomachean Ethics by Aristotle
- Il Corbaccio by Boccaccio

His son served as a secretary to Maria de Medici. His grandson Raffaello Corbinelli (died 1716) was an erudite and witty courtier in Paris.
