= Nicolas Bergier =

French archeologist and historian (1567–1623)

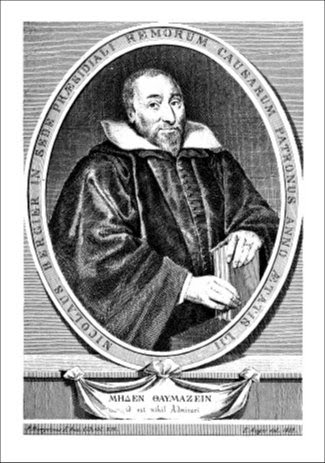

Nicolas Bergier (French: [bɛʁʒje]), (1 March 1567 – 18 August 1623) was a lawyer at the Presidential Seat of Rheims, lived in 17th-century Rheims (then in Champagne province) and became interested in Roman roads there. Mentioning by chance his interest in the funding of Roman roads to Conde du Lis, advisor to Louis XIII, he found himself suddenly commanded by the king to undertake a study of all Roman roads. Five years later he published his Histoire des Grands Chemins de l'Empire Romain, a two-volume work of over 1000 pages. There were many subsequent editions. This first scholarly study of Roman roads included engravings of the Tabula Peutingeriana. Edward Gibbon consulted Bergier's work while researching his Decline and Fall of the Roman Empire.

== Biography ==
Bergier was born on 1 March 1567 in Rheims. He was a lawyer and historian.

Bergier taught at the Collège des Bons-Enfants and at the Faculty of Law of the University of Rheims. Friend with Jacques Dupuy and Nicolas-Claude Fabri de Peiresc, he was appointed, thanks to another friend the president De Bellièvre, historiographer of France, with a pension of two hundred ecus.

Bergier worked with Charles du Lys, lawyer, and Nicolas Brulart de Sillery, Chancellor of France.

Bergier died at the Château de Grignon in Thiverval-Grignon on 18 August 1623, at the age of 56.

== Bibliography ==
- Portrait
