= Claude Catherine de Clermont =

French noblewoman, courtier, writer and salon host (1543–1603)

- Duchess de Retz (1581-1603); Marquise de Belle-Île (1573-1603); Dame du Perron (1565-1603)
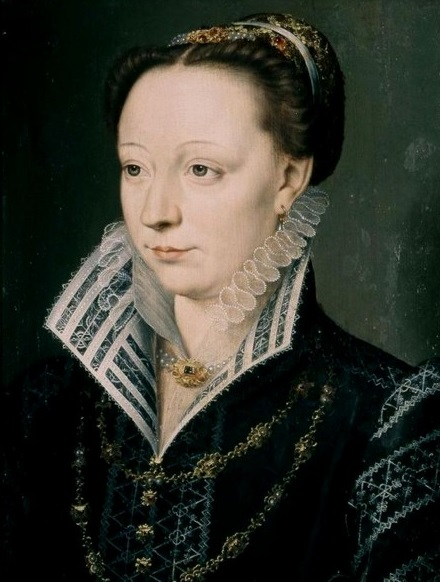
- Predecessor: Marie Catherine Gondi
- Successor: Antoinette d'Orléans-Longueville
- Born: 1543; Paris, France
- Died: 18 February 1603 (aged 59–60); Paris, France
- Noble family: Gondi family
- Spouses: Jean d'Annebault (m. 1562, wid. 1563); Albert de Gondi (m. 1565, wid. 1602)
- Issue: Françoise de Gondi (1567 – 1627); Charles de Gondi (1569 – 1596); Claude Marguerite de Gondi (1570–1650); Henri de Gondi (1572 – 1622); Louise de Gondi (1573 – 1661); Madeleine de Gondi (1578 – 1662); Philippe Emmanuel de Gondi (1581 – 1626); Jean-François de Gondi (1584 – 1654); Hyppolite de Gondi (1585 – 1646)
- Parents: Claude de Clermont; Jeanne de Dampierre

Claude Catherine de Clermont-Tonnerre de Vivonne (1543 – 18 February 1603), lady of Dampierre, countess and duchess of Retz, was a French courtier, writer, and salon host.

== Life ==
=== Family and private life ===
Claude Catherine de Clermont was born in Paris, the only child of Claude de Clermont-Tonnerre and of Jeanne de Vivonne. In 1562, she married Jean d'Annebault at 18 in an unhappy marriage, but was widowed at 20 after d'Annebault was killed in the Battle of Dreux in 1563.

In 1565, she married for a second time to Albert de Gondi on September 4, 1565, taking on the title Duchess of Retz. She and de Gondi had ten children together, 6 daughters and 4 sons.

Clermont and de Gondi loved to entertain in their house in Paris, which they named the Hotel de Dampierre. This Hotel de Dampierre eventually became one of the most well-known literary salons of the time.

=== Court career ===
Claude-Catherine de Clermont was appointed lady in waiting to queen Catherine de Medici of France, taking on the title Dame du Palais. She was later appointed Governess of the Children of France, which entailed educating the children and grandchildren of the monarchy. Notably, Clermont became the lady in waiting to Medici’s daughter, Marguerite de Valois, who would later frequent her literary salon.

In addition to her duty as a lady in waiting to the royal family, Clermont was fluent in many languages, such as Latin and Greek. Because of this, she was requested by the Medicis court to translate for foreign visitors.

Clermont was also very active in political thought and influence. She was sympathetic towards protestants while also remaining supportive of the royal family. Her son, Marquis de Belleisle, did not share this support of the king, and formed a rebellion against Henry IV with other subjects. Claude-Catherine de Clermont initiated the cause of gathering soldiers, which eventually led to the demise of the short-lived rebellion. For her assistance in suppressing the rebellion, she was rewarded with wealth and honors by Henry IV himself.

=== Cultural activity ===
Out of Clermont’s house in Paris grew one of the most well-known literary salons of the time that Clermont named the Salon Vert, or the Green Salon. She may have started her salon because her mother-in-law, Marie-Catherine de Pierrevive, hosted a bustling literary salon of her own in the 16th century, or because salons were popular and influential in France. Salons allowed women to hold positions of power and influence, as women engaged in conversation with writers and scholars. This was true for Clermont, and she was highly respected within the salon. Salon Vert mainly hosted lovers of poetry, specifically pastoral poetry, but was also a place where people could exchange ideas and conversation.

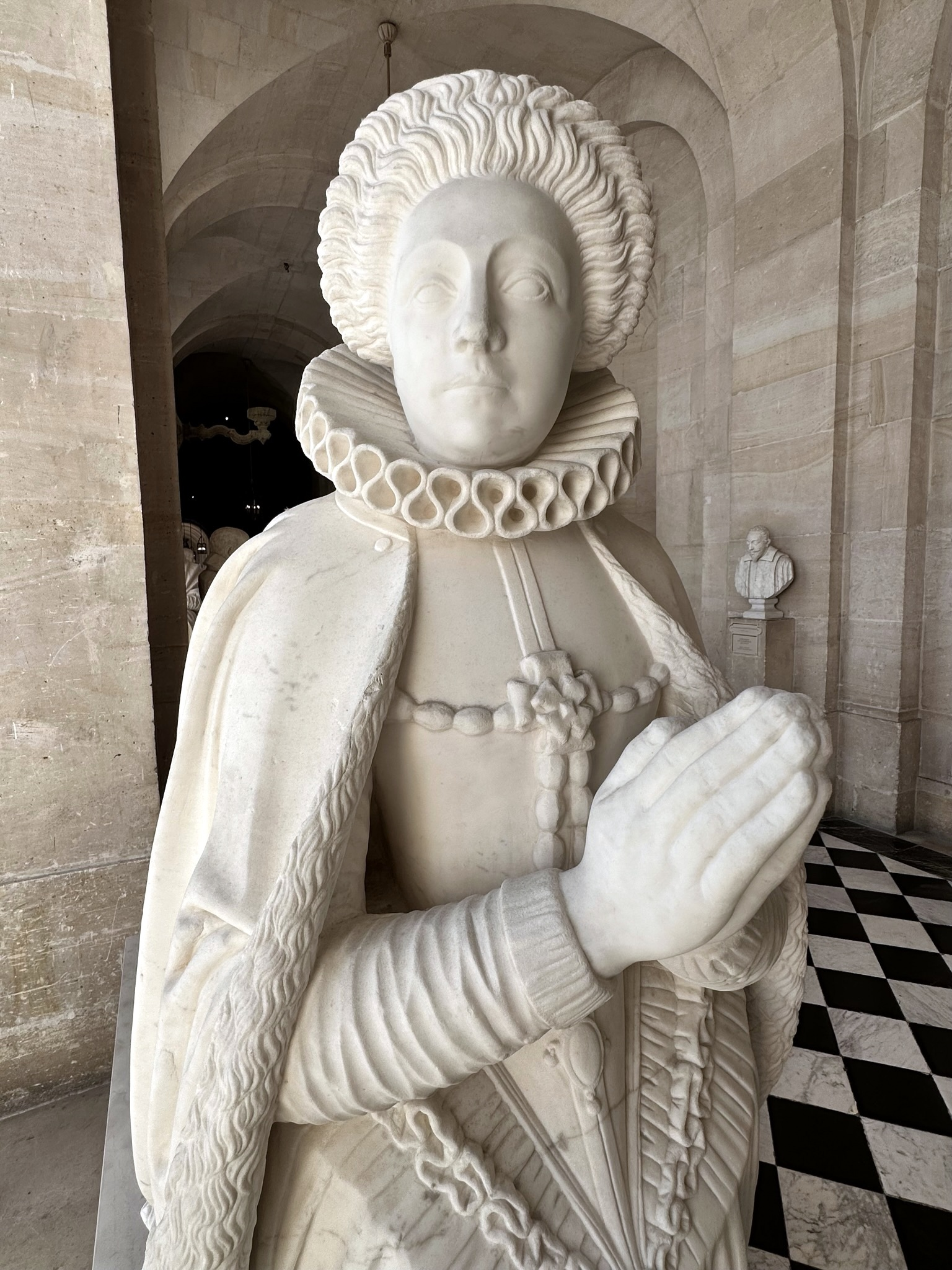
Statue of Claude Catherine de Clermont in the Palace of Versailles

Within the salon, Clermont held an influential position, partly of her own creation. She adopted the pseudonym and persona “Dyctinne” in her Salon, who is a nymph in Roman mythology. Dyctinne is the attendant to Diana, much like Clermont was the attendant to Marguerite de Valois, who is often referred to as Diana in poetry. The adaption of this persona allowed Clermont to create a magical and inspiring setting for her salon guests, and gave her influence. Because Clermont and other women at the salon were seen as nymph-like figures, women were able to be somewhat removed from the misogynistic traditions of the time.

Claude-Catherine de Clermont was a muse, a voice of encouragement, and an inspiration to poets within Salon Vert. She is mentioned and referred to in many notable poets’ writings, such as those of Estienne Pasquier. His poem "Pastorale du Vieillard Amoureux" is based on an encounter between himself and Clermont at Salon Vert. The topic of conversation was the question of love, and who can love deeper: an old man or a young man. In this conversation, Clermont jokingly calls Pasquier a “bonhomme” or an old man. In "Pastorale du Vieillard Amoureux", Pasquier recreates this conversation through fictional characters in the poem. No response is recorded from Clermont, though she was a very accomplished author.

Clermont is referred to by other poets, such as Amadis Jamyn in his Pontus de Tard, where he praises Clermont, comparing her to the goddess Artemis, the goddess of the hunt and wilderness. The Poem “Le Sejour Dyctinne et des Muses” in the Retz Album of the Manuscrit Français 25455 writes about the Salon Vert, calling the salon group an “immoral band” created by Clermont. References to Clermont are also found in the writings of Etienne Jodelle and other male poets, as well as female poets, such as Anne de Thourville and Marguerite de Valois.

While Clermont was an inspiration in many other poets’ writings, she also circulated her own writings. However, these were mainly produced in manuscript, and little has been preserved.

Outside of the salon, Clermont had other interests. She was skilled in music, dance, and debate, dancing in the Ballet Comique de la Reine, which is commonly known as the first ballet de cour, or ballet that combined poetry, music, and dance. Clermont also showed her skill and interest in debate with her participation in the Académie du Palais debate.

Clermont was one of the very few women admitted to the Académie du Palais by Henry III, where philosophical and ethical topics and ideas were discussed with a focus on oratory and debate. The Académie required participation from everyone, and each person was chosen specifically for their abilities.

She was also a patroness of the arts, supporting the foundation of Jean-Antoine de Baïf's Académie de musique et de poésie in 1570.

Clermont died on February 18, 1603.

Court offices
Preceded by Louise de Clermont	Governess of the Children of France	Succeeded by Isabelle de Monthoiron
