= Albert de Gondi =

French noble and marshal (1522–1602)

- Duc de Retz; Marshal of France
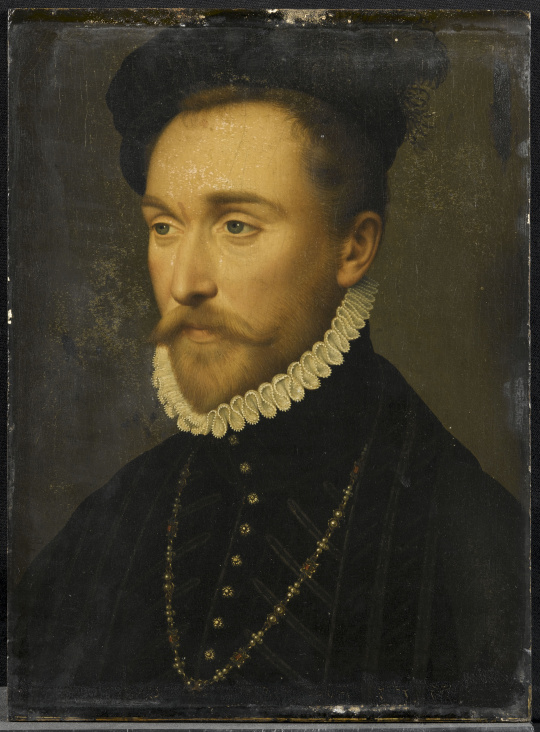
- Born: 4 November 1522 Florence
- Died: c. 1602
- Noble family: Gondi family
- Spouse: Claude Catherine de Clermont-Tonnerre
- Father: Guidobaldo, seigneur du Perron
- Mother: Marie Catherine Gondi

Albert de Gondi (4 November 1522 in Florence – 1602) seigneur du Perron, comte, then marquis de Belle-Isle (1573), duc de Retz (from 1581), was a marshal of France and a member of the Gondi family. Beginning his career during the Italian Wars he fought at the Battle of Renty in 1554, and in many of the campaigns into Italy in the following years, before returning to France for the disastrous battle of Saint-Quentin and battle of Gravelines both of which saw the French army savaged.

With the conclusion of the Italian Wars in 1559, Retz found himself caught up in the French Wars of Religion which broke out in 1562. As an Italian outsider to much of the French aristocracy, Catherine de Medici brought him into her circle, hoping he would act as a counterweight at court to the great families of Guise and Montmorency. As part of the royal party he fought at the victories of Saint-Denis, Jarnac and Moncontour. Alongside his military potential the court saw his diplomatic potential and he played a role in the marriages of the king, and of his sister. In 1572 he was deeply implicated in the decision to massacre the Protestant leadership in Paris that spiralled out into the Massacre of Saint Bartholomew.

Again entrusted as a diplomat he was sent to England to negotiate the marriage of the king's brother. On his return he fought at the siege of La Rochelle where he was shot in the stomach. Soon thereafter he was elevated to the Marshalate with the death of Tavannes. Tavannes had also agreed that Retz would inherit his governorship of Provence in return for Retz ceding his governorship of Metz to Tavannes' son. In the fifth civil war Retz led an army into Provence against Damville. Returning to the role of diplomat he negotiated with Parma to smooth over the French seizure of Cambrai. In 1594 he took a role in the conseil des finances after the death of François d'O.

== Early life and family ==
Albert de Gondi was the son of Guidobaldo, seigneur de Perron, who became a banker at Lyon, and his mother was Marie Catherine Gondi. His siblings included cardinal Pierre de Gondi. The Gondi family were fairly recent elevations to nobility, having been ennobled in the fifteenth-century.

On 4 September 1565, he became the second husband of Claude Catherine de Clermont-Tonnerre, baroness of Retz and of Dampierre, daughter of Claude de Clermont-Tonnerre, baron de Dampierre, with whom he had 10 children:

- Charles (1569-1596), marquis de Belle-Isle, général des Galères de France, who married Antoinette d'Orléans-Longueville;
- Claude-Marguerite (1570-1650), who married Florimond, marquis de Piennes (+1592);
- Françoise (+1627), who married Lancelot Grognet de Vassé;
- Gabrielle who married Claude de Bossut, seigneur d'Escry;
- Hyppolite (+1646) who married Léonor de Magdelaine marquis de Ragny;
- Henri de Gondi, cardinal de Retz (1572-1622), bishop of Paris.
- Louise (1572-1661), nun;
- Madelaine (+1662), nun;
- Philippe-Emmanuel (1581-1626), comte de Joigny, marquis de Belle-Isle, baron de Montmirel, général des Galères de France, who married Françoise de Silly (+1625), dame de Commercy, daughter of Antoine, comte de La Rochepot.
- Jean-François de Gondi, cardinal de Retz (1584-1654), first archbishop of Paris.

== Reign of Henri II ==
He joined the court of Henry II of France on his accession in 1547 and around 1550 joined a company of chevau-légers. On 13 August 1554 he served at the battle of Renty and soon afterward Henry II made him a gentleman of the chamber and master of the wardrobe to Charles of France. He continued to occupy these posts under Charles IX and Henry III.

In 1555, he made a name for himself in Italy, at the sieges of Ulpiau and Coni and the taking of Verceil. He also served with great distinction in the expeditions into Piedmont and Corsica. On 10 August 1557 he participated in the Battle of Saint-Quentin and on 13 July 1558 at the battle of Gravelines. He was in 1559 made captain of a company of gendarmes.

== Reign of Charles IX ==
=== Early civil wars ===
As Catherine sought to separate herself and her son from the great families who had dominated the throne over the past decade she increasingly turned to uncommitted Catholics such as Vielleville and new courtiers whose loyalty could be more easily tied to the throne, most prominent among them Retz. In 1565 Retz became comte de Retz. The following year he was made governor of the king.

He fought with his company at their head at the battle of Saint-Denis on 10 November 1567, at Jarnac on 13 March 1569 and at the Moncontour on the following 3 October.

=== Diplomat ===
With many connections in imperial circles, Retz was entrusted to pick up Elizabeth of Austria from the imperial court at Wien to bring her to her new husband, Charles. Charles met them at Sedan and the two were wed at Charleville-Mézières the same day.

Knighted on the king's orders, he won a place as conseiller d’État. On the death of marshal Vieilleville, the comte de Retz was made governor and lieutenant-general in the pays messin, and governor of the town of Metz, by provisions granted at Duretal on 30 November 1571. He was then made captain of the first company of gentlemen of the king's household after the death of Claude Gouffier, Duc de Roannois in December the same year.

As war with Spain increasingly loomed as a possibility in mid 1572 after the debacle of the Genlis expedition, Retz was alleged to have assured several ambassadors that he would ensure the council voted against war. In response leading Protestant nobles threatened to kill him. Retz acted as an intermediary between Catherine and the clergy of Paris as their approval for the marriage of Navarre and Margaret of Valois was sought. Unable to find many theologians in the Sorbonne who would assent, it was agreed the act of having consulted them would suffice.

=== Massacre of Saint Bartholomew ===
After the attempt on Coligny's life on 22 August, Retz attended the wounded Admirals bedside with the king, urging him to accept residence in the Louvre while he recovered, Coligny declined. He was among those who held council with Catherine when the policy of liquidation of the Protestant leadership was agreed upon the following evening. When blame is cast for the figure on the council who convinced Charles to order the killings, Retz is often blamed by historians.

=== England ===
Retz travelled to England at the request of Catherine as a proxy for Alençon during the negotiations between France and England for a prospective marriage between Elizabeth I and Alençon. Retz was treated with great pomp during his stay, despite his recorded involvement in the recent massacre. Elizabeth was concerned however about the prince's appearance and Retz promised to provide a more flattering portrait, returning to France in September.

Upon his return Retz commanded a squadron and forced count Montgomery to abandon Belle-Isle. The French king raised this town to a marquisate and granted it to Retz. With La Rochelle entering revolt in the wake of the Massacre, Retz fought in the siege that followed. During the siege Charles urged Anjou to follow the military suggestions of Retz for the conduct of the campaign. Retz would be shot in the kidney by the defenders during the attempted capture of the city.

=== Marshal ===
Retz was granted the governorship of Provence upon the death of Honorat I de Savoie. The governorship had originally gone to Tavannes however he had agreed to resign it on his death, which occurred in June 1573, in favour of Retz on condition Retz resigned his governorship of the city of Metz to Tavannes' son. As a result of Tavannes' death there was also a vacancy in the marshalate, Retz was granted the honour at the château de Boulogne on 6 July 1573

== Reign of Henri III ==
=== Commonwealth ===
Upon travelling to the Commonwealth with Henri, the new king awarded him a large pension of several hundred thousand livres. he was instructed on the king's return to spend some time in Germany, to be able to report to the court on the situation there. Upon his return to France he resigned the office of Constable which he had held with Henri in his role as king of the Commonwealth. While no longer Constable he was granted the office of first gentleman of the chamber, a post he shared with Villequier each taking six months of the year.

=== Fifth civil war ===
As civil war again resumed in 1574, with the rebellion of the Politique's Retz was among the 'foreign influences', Henri I de Montmorency railed against in his declaration of rebellion. Retz was assigned to lead one of the armies against Damville, campaigning in Provence. Retz was again attacked in Alençon's manifesto when he joined Damville in rebellion the following year.

In 1578 despite the protests of the recent Estates General of 1576 about the practice, Retz resigned his governorship of Provence in favour of a successor of his choosing, the comte de Suze. Before the reign of Henri II a governor being allowed to name their successor had been exceedingly rare. Still loyal to his patron Catherine, he continued to champion her policy at court even after she herself reduced her involvement in the council of state.

=== Eclipsed ===
After having held the office of first gentleman of the chamber for 15 years, he was obliged to surrender it in 1581, so that the king's favourite Anne de Joyeuse could assume the role. Upon the death of Alençon in 1584, the prince willed Cambrai to the king. Henri in turn offered the city to his mother who accepted. Retz was sent to negotiate with the Spanish leader Parma who angrily demanded the city back. Parma was ill-inclined to go to war over Cambrai and a truce was agreed in December 1584.

When the king proposed in 1587, that he would meet the invading German army personally, Retz was among those councillors who virulently opposed such a plan, however he was unable to convince the king.

While the estates of Blois met in 1588, it was a ligue dominated body. Retz paid them little mind, like many of the politiques around Henri he was more interested in the duels of court than the legal wranglings of the estates. Retz also patronised the Académie du Palais which undertook philosophical debates during this time.

== Reign of Henri IV ==
After the death of François d'O in 1594, his role in the conseil des finances was assumed by a collaboration of important nobles, among them Retz. As a body they attempted every fiscal mechanism they could conceive of in hopes of getting out of the massive deficit the regime was in by this point.

=== Assembly of Notables ===
In November 1596, the king convoked an Assembly of Notables at Rouen. Their purpose was to consider several proposals to alleviate the financial hardship the kingdom was experiencing. One package was prepared by the king's minister the baron de Rosny and proposed various quick expedients to secure a cash flow, the other was devised by Bellièvre, and was constituted of a wide scale austerity program, with large restructuring of France's finances. To lead the discussions of the notables in considering these proposals matters were divided into three chambers which were led by Retz, the duc de Montpensier and Marshal Matignon respectively.

In the end, the notables agreed to the establishment of a new tax, known as the pancarte which appropriated 1/20th of the revenue of goods, and a year long suspension of royal wages among other resolutions.

Albert de Gondi portrait "D'or, à deux masses d'armes de sable, passées en sautoir et liées de gueules".

== Sources ==
- Babelon, Jean-Pierre (2009). Henri IV. Fayard.
- Baird, Henry (1880). History of the Rise of the Huguenots: Vol 2 of 2. Hodder & Stoughton.
- Carroll, Stuart (2005). Noble Power during the French Wars of Religion: The Guise Affinity and the Catholic Cause in Normandy. Cambridge University Press.
- Diefendorf, Barbara (1991). Beneath the Cross: Catholics and Huguenots in Sixteenth Century Paris. Oxford University Press.
- Harding, Robert (1978). Anatomy of a Power Elite: the Provincial Governors in Early Modern France. Yale University Press.
- Holt, Mack (2002). The Duke of Anjou and the Politique Struggle During the Wars of Religion. Cambridge University Press.
- Jouanna, Arlette (2007). The St Bartholomew's Day Massacre: The Mysteries of a Crime of State. Manchester University Press.
- Knecht, Robert (1998). Catherine de' Medici. Routledge.
- Knecht, Robert (2016). Hero or Tyrant? Henry III, King of France, 1574-1589. Routledge.
- Roelker, Nancy (1968). Queen of Navarre: Jeanne d'Albret 1528-1572. Harvard University Press.
- Salmon, J.H.M (1975). Society in Crisis: France during the Sixteenth Century. Metheun & Co.
- Sutherland, Nicola (1980). The Huguenot Struggle for Recognition. Yale University Press.
- Thompson, James (1909). The Wars of Religion in France 1559-1576: The Huguenots, Catherine de Medici and Philip II. Chicago University Press.
- Wood, James (2002). The Kings Army: Warfare, Soldiers and Society during the Wars of Religion in France, 1562-1576. Cambridge University Press.
