= Trie-Château =

- Commune
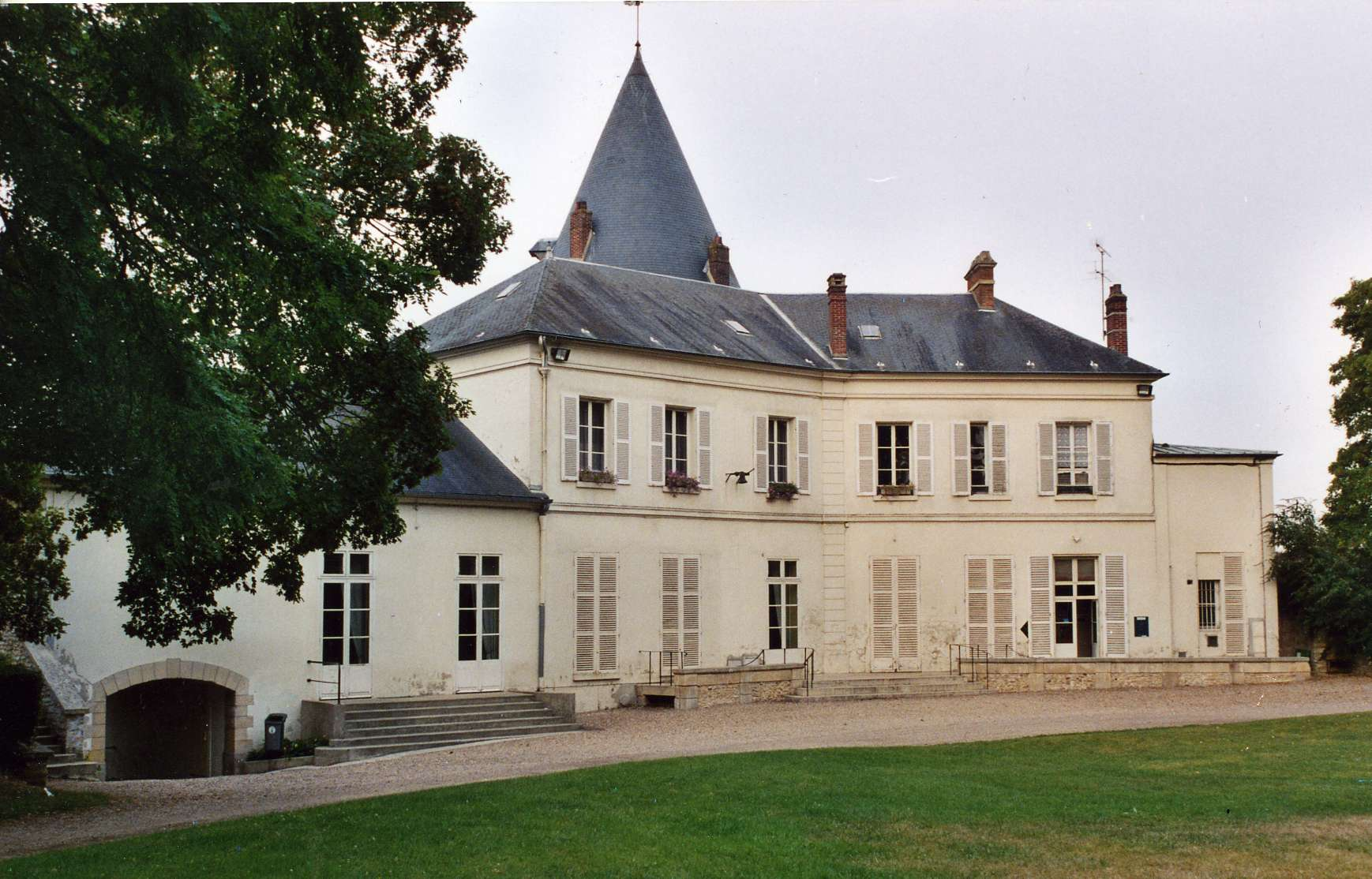
- The town hall in Trie-Château

- Coat of arms
- Location of Trie-Château
- Location within France Location within Hauts-de-France
- Coordinates: 49°17′06″N 1°49′20″E
- Country: France
- Region: Hauts-de-France
- Department: Oise
- Arrondissement: Beauvais
- Canton: Chaumont-en-Vexin
- Intercommunality: Vexin Thelle

Government
  - Mayor (2020–2026): Laurent Desmeliers
- Area^{1}: 13.34 km^{2} (5.15 sq mi)
- Elevation: 66 m (217 ft)
- Highest elevation: 146 m (479 ft)
- Lowest elevation: 52 m (171 ft)
- Population (2023): 1,875
  - Density: 140.6/km^{2} (364.0/sq mi)
- Time zone: UTC+01:00 (CET)
  - Summer (DST): UTC+02:00 (CEST)
- INSEE/Postal code: 60644 /60590
- ^{1} French Land Register data, which excludes lakes, ponds, glaciers > 1 km^{2} (0.386 sq mi or 247 acres) and river estuaries.

Trie-Château (French pronunciation: [tʁi ʃɑto]) is a commune in the Oise department in northern France. On 1 January 2018, the former commune of Villers-sur-Trie was merged into Trie-Château.

== Notable person ==
- Antoniette d'Orléans-Longueville (1572–1618), French noble lady born in Trie-Château
- Charles François Dupuis (1742–1809), polymath and theologian, was born in Trie-Château

== See also ==
- Communes of the Oise department
