= Marie-Catherine Gondi =

French court official and favorite of Catherine de Medici (c. 1500–1570)

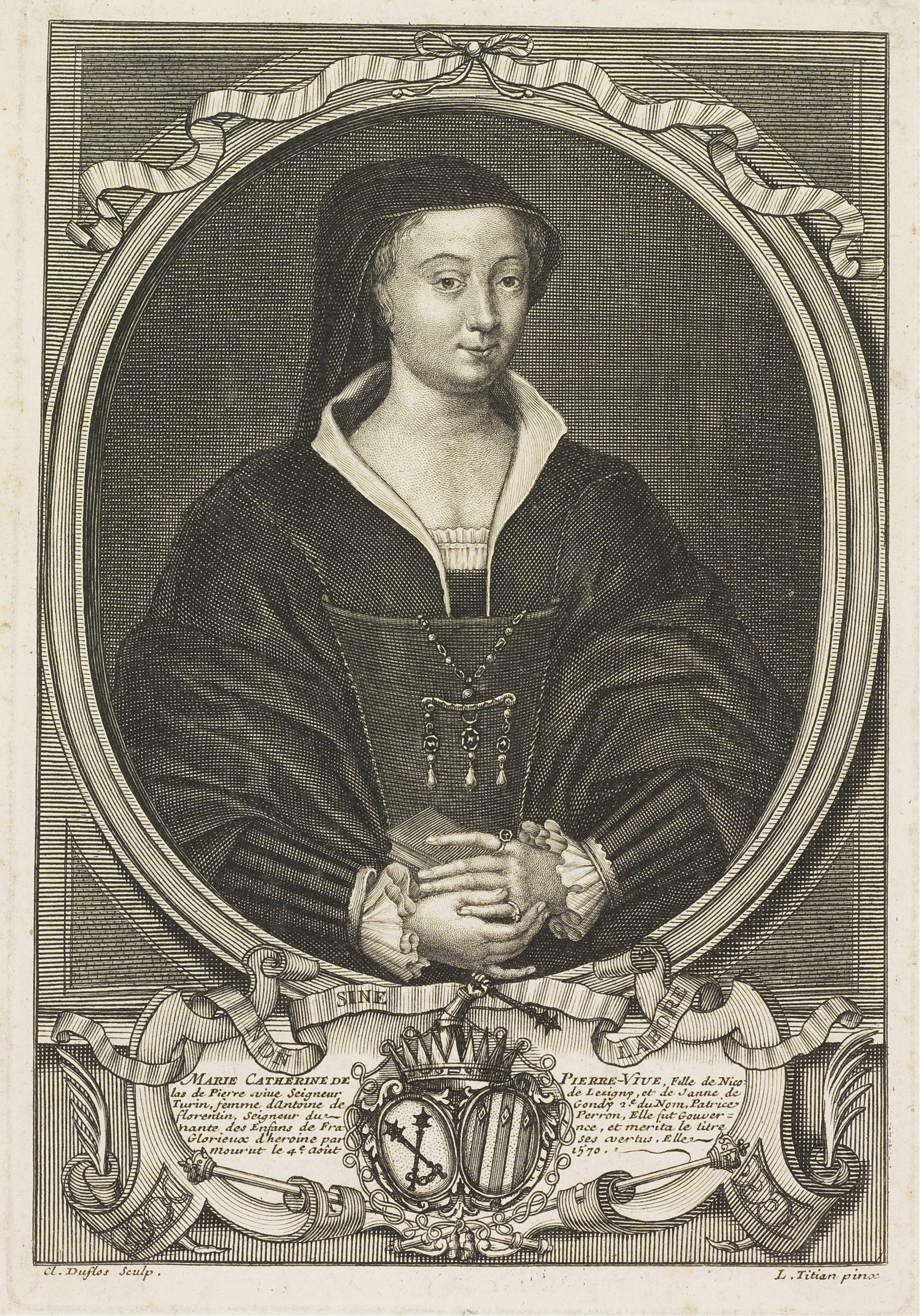
Portrait of Marie-Catherine Pierrevive by Claude Duflos after a painting by Titian

Marie Catherine Gondi, née de Pierrevive, dame du Perron and dame d'Armentières (circa 1500 – 1570), was a French court official and a trusted favorite and confidante of the Queen Regent of France, Catherine de Medici. She served as dame d'atour to Queen Catherine (1544-1552), Governess to the Children of France (1550–1559) and Dame to Mary Stuart (1559–1560).

== Life ==
Marie-Catherine Gondi was the daughter of Jeanne de Turin and Nicolas de Pierrevive, a rich tax-farmer in Lyon. Her family was of Italian origin and active within banking in Lyon. She was very close to her father's brothers and she grew up in the Belregard, a castle which was built over a demolished house which her father bought.

=== Life in Lyon ===
In 1516, she married Florentine banker Antoine (Antonio or Guidobaldo) Gondi (1486–1560), who had emigrated to France in 1506. Antoine de Gondi was a member of the Italian Gondi family, who was to make a great career in the offices of the royal households under the patronage of Catherine de Medici, and the marriage between Marie Catherine and Antoine de Gondi is estimated to have been the beginning of the Gondi party's rise at court. Marie Catherine Gondi was the mother of ten children, many of whom made careers within the royal court, most notably Albert de Gondi (who married Claude Catherine de Clermont).

Marie Catherine Gondi became a leading figure in Lyon. In 1521, her spouse acquired the noble estate or seigneurie du Perron, and during the 1520s- and 1530s, Marie Catherine Gondi became the central figure in a circle of humanists and intellectuals such as Étienne Dolet, Bonaventure Des Périers, Papire Masson and Maurice Scève.

=== Court career ===
Marie-Catherine Gondi made the acquaintance of Catherine de Medicis in 1533, when Catherine visited the city of Lyon shortly after her wedding to the future Henry II of France. In 1544, she was called to the household of Catherine, where she became her trusted companion and personal friend.

In 1550, she was appointed royal governess (Gouvernante des Enfants de France) to the royal children. Queen Catherine recommended her to the household of the royal children to have an ally there, as the royal nursery was controlled by Jean d'Humières and his wife Françoise d'Humières, the governor and the governess to the royal children respectively, who were loyal to Diane de Poitiers, but the king only appointed Marie-Catherine Gondi as sub-governess and she under ranked d'Humières.

In 1559, Catherine appointed her Dame (lady-in-waiting) to her daughter-in-law, Mary Stuart. Gondi was given the responsibility for Catherine's personal finances general administrator for her projects and building works and in effect became her treasurer. She often acted as Catherine's business agent, buying and selling property on her behalf: notably when she lend Catherine money to finance the construction of the Tuileries Palace, and given power to represent Catherine during its construction.

Gondi's favored position as a trusted confidante of Catherine made her the subject of sensational rumors. One such rumor, recounted by Tallemant des Reaux, was that Gondi, by means of a recipe, cured the supposed infertility of Catherine and enabled her to start conceive in 1543, after ten years of marriage without children. This was supposedly the cause of the patronage of Catherine de Medici of the Gondi family, and the great success of that family in acquiring offices in the royal household.

It is believed Gondi died on August 4, 1570.
