= Seigneurs and Dukes of Retz =

Retz's coat of arms.

Seigneurs and Dukes of Retz owned the district of Retz or Rais, is in South Brittany.

== History ==
Rais belonged in early times to a house which bore its name, and of which the eldest branch became extinct in the 13th century in the Chabot family.

From the Chabot family the lordship passed to the Lavals. Gilles de Laval, sire de Retz (c. 1405–1440), the comrade-in-arms of Joan of Arc and marshal of France, gave himself over to the most revolting debauchery, and was strangled and burned at Nantes.

The barony of Retz passed successively to the families of Tournemine, Annebaut and Gondi. In 1581 it was erected into a duchy in the peerage of France (duché-pairie) for Albert de Gondi, marshal of France and general of the galleys. Pierre de Gondi, brother of the first duc de Retz, became bishop of Paris in 1570 and cardinal in 1587. He was succeeded by his nephews, Henri (died 1622) and Jean François de Gondi (died 1654), for whom the episcopal see of Paris was erected into an archbishopric in 1622, and by his great-nephew, Jean François Paul de Gondi, the famous cardinal de Retz.

With the death of the last male of the house of Gondi in 1676 the duché-pairie became extinct; the lordship passed to the house of Neuville-Villeroy.
