= Jeanne de Dampierre =

French court official (1511–1583)

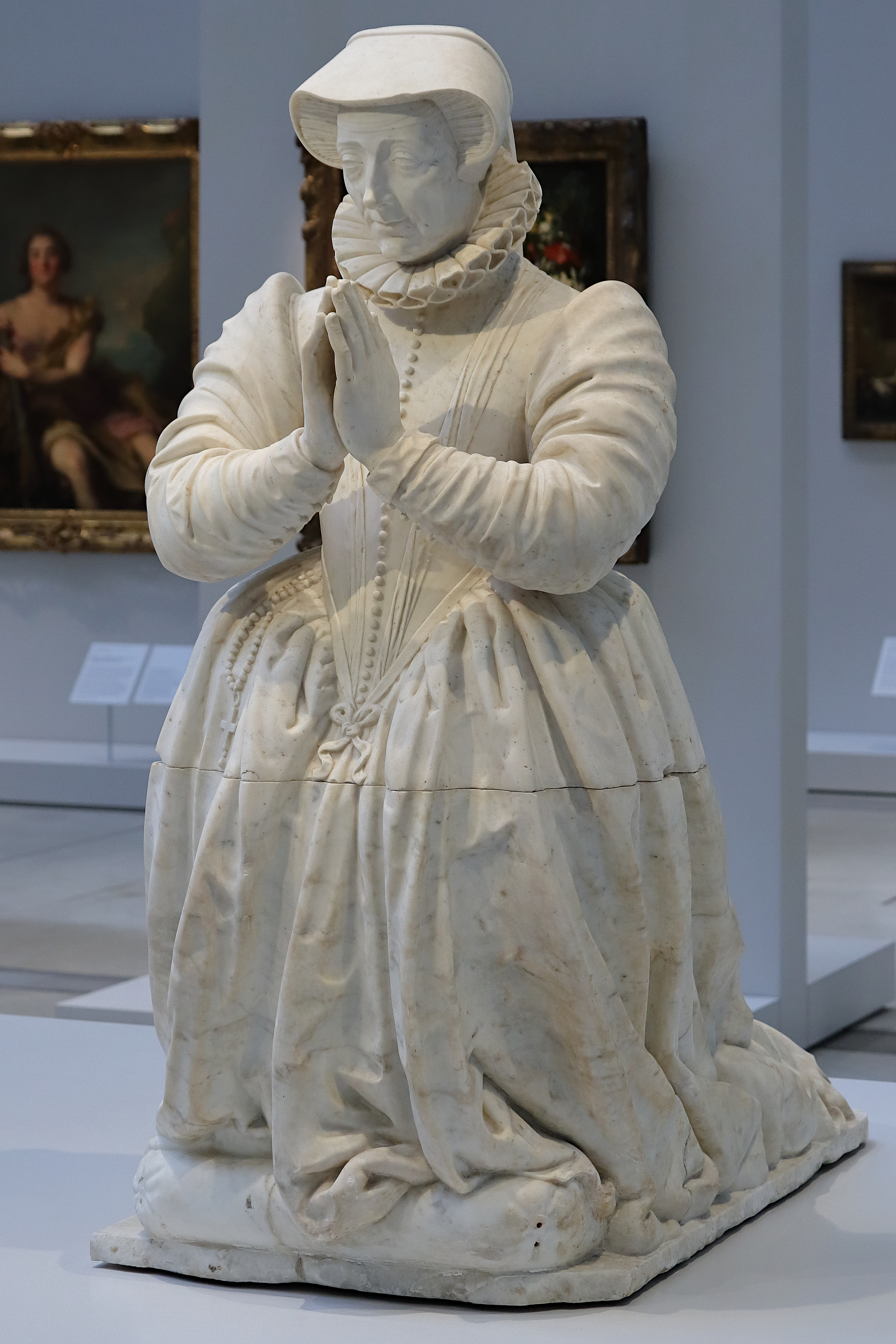
Jeanne de Dampierre

Jeanne de Dampierre, née de Vivonne (1511 – 6 April 1583) was a French court official. She served as Première dame d'honneur to the queen of France, Louise of Lorraine, from 1575 until 1583.

== Life ==
Jeanne de Dampierre was the daughter of André de Vivonne, baron de la Chaftaigneraye, and Louise de Daillon du Lude. She married constable Claude de Clermont, baron de Dampierre (died 1545). Their daughter was Claude Catherine de Clermont.

Her mother Louise de Daillon du Lude and sister Anne de Vivonne were both attached to the court of queen Marguerite of Navarre, and she herself attended court from the age of eight. She was well liked by Marguerite of Navarre, so much so that king Francis I of France on one occasion asked her to act as mediator between him and his sister.

In 1575, she was appointed to the office of Première dame d'honneur to the new queen of France, Louise of Lorraine, and as such responsible for the female courtiers of the queen (one Dame d'atour, 26 Dame and 14 Fille); of controlling the budget, organizing the annual account and staff list, as well as supervising the daily routine and presentations to the queen. Having attended the French royal court since her childhood, she was given the task to guide queen Louise in court protocol and help her to play her role as queen, a task she is said to have done successfully.

By her sister Anne de Vivonne she was the aunt of Pierre de Bourdeille, seigneur de Brantôme, who often referred to her regarding information about the court in his famous works about the personages in the court of France, and he described her as:

"Mme. de Dampierre, my aunt, a true Court register, and as clever, wise, and virtuous a lady as ever entered a Court these hundred years, and who knew well how to discourse on old things. From eight years of age she was brought up at Court, and forgot nothing; it was good to hear her talk; and I have seen our kings and queens take a singu- lar pleasure in listening to her, for she knew all, — her own time and past times; so that people took word from her as from an oracle. King Henri III. made her lady of honour to the queen, his wife. I have here used recollections and lessons that I obtained from her, and I hope to use many more in the course of these books."

== Sources ==
- de L'Estoile, Pierre (2000). Lazard, Madeleine; Schrenck, Gilbert (eds.). Registre-journal du règne de Henri III: 1582-1584 (in French). Droz.
- Jacqueline Boucher, Deux épouses et reines à la fin du XVIe siècle: Louise de Lorraine et ...
- Brantôme, Pierre de Bourdeille, The book of the ladies (illustrious dames)

Court offices
Preceded by Madeleine of Savoy	Première dame d'honneur to the Queen of France; 1575–1583	Succeeded by Louise de Cipierre
