= Louise de Prie =

French noblewoman and court official

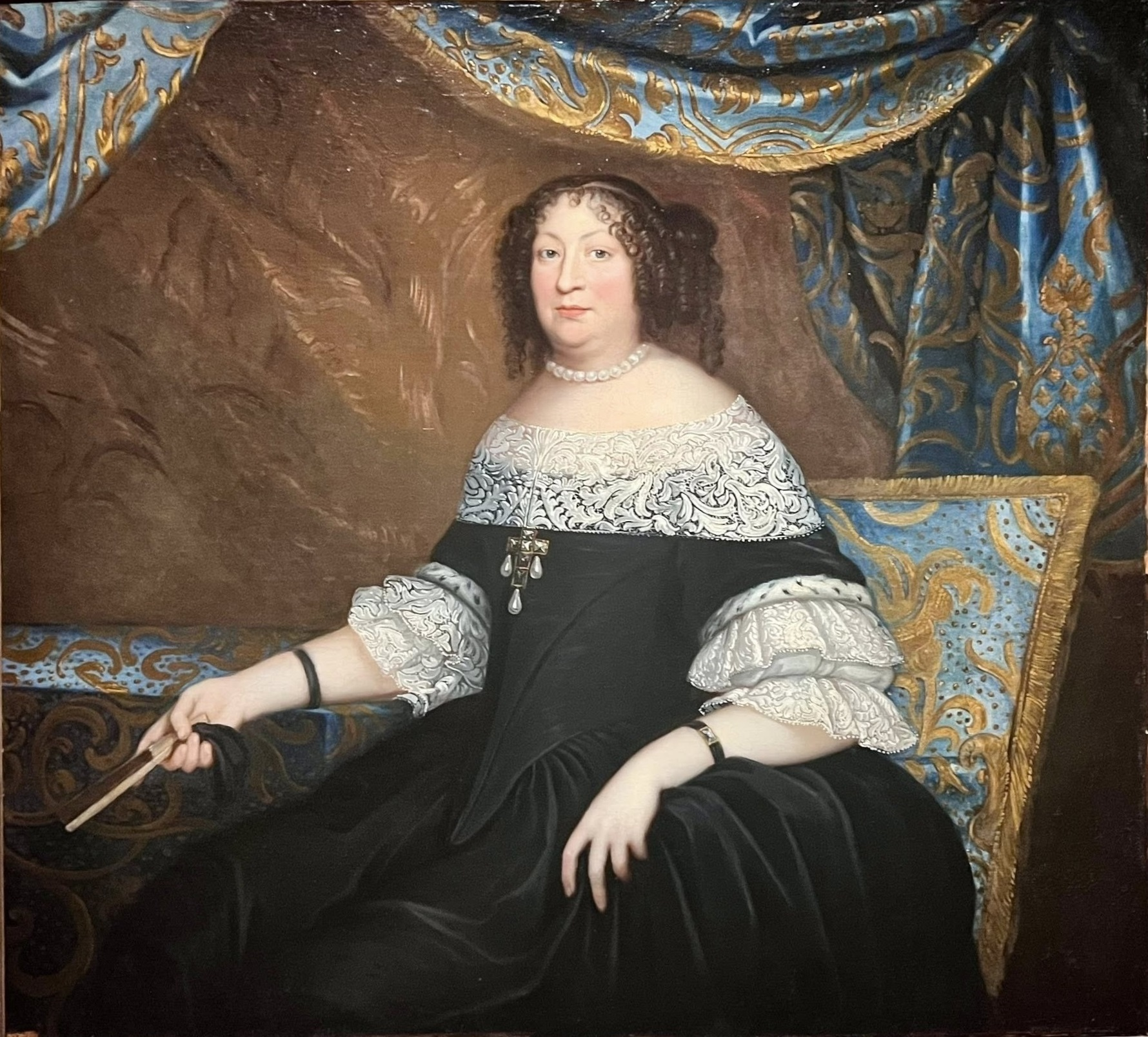
Mme la maréchale de Lamothe

Louise de Prie de La Mothe-Houdancourt (1624–1709), was a French noblewoman and court official. She served as royal governess to the children of King Louis XIV in 1661-1672, to the children of Louis, Grand Dauphin in 1682-1691, and finally to the children of Louis, Duke of Burgundy in 1704-1709.

== Life ==
Louise de Prie was born to Louis de Prie, Marquis de Toucy, and Françoise de Saint-Gelais-Lusignan, and married Marshal Philippe de La Mothe-Houdancourt, duke de Cardona, in 1650. She became the mother of:

- Françoise Angélique (1650–1711), married Louis, duc d'Aumont
- Charlotte Éléonore Madeleine (1651–1744), Duchess of Ventadour by her marriage with Louis-Charles de Lévis and governess of Louis XV and his children,
- Marie Isabelle Gabrielle Angélique (1654–1726), married Henri François de Saint Nectaire (1657–1703), son of Henri de La Ferté-Senneterre and Duke of La Ferté-Senneterre.

Court offices
Preceded by Julie d'Angennes	Governess of the Children of France; 1661–1709	Succeeded by Marie de La Mothe-Houdancourt
