= Françoise d'Humières =

French court official and governess (c. 1489–1557)

Françoise d'Humières, Dame de Contay, née de Contay (circa 1489–1557), was a French court official; she served as Governess of the Children of France from 1546 to 1557.

== Career ==
Françoise d'Humières was the daughter of Charles de Contay, sénéchal du Maine, and Barbe de Hallwin, and married the courtier Jean d'Humières (d. 1550) in 1507. She inherited the lordship of Contay from her father, and became Dame de Contay.

In 1546, she and her spouse were appointed governor and governess to the Dauphin, and subsequently became the main governor and governess to all the children of king Henry II of France and Catherine de Medici. The royal children were raised under their direct supervision, under the orders of Diane de Poitiers. As head governor and governess, the d'Humières couple headed the staff of the royal nursery, staff of about 250 people, which included tutors and governesses of lower rank, who attended more directly to each of the children. Among them was notably Marie-Catherine Gondi, who served as sub-governess. The royal children were mainly raised away from the rest of the court at the Château de Saint-Germain-en-Laye, and when the royal court visited Saint Germain, the nursery was sent to Château de Blois or Château d'Amboise.

From 1548, the nursery was expanded to include Mary, Queen of Scots and her governess (Janet Stewart, Lady Fleming, later Françoise de Paroy) and personal Scottish entourage of about 30 people. In January 1549, Henry II sent a dance teacher or balladin said to be "virtuous and well conditioned" to join the household and teach the royal children and their companions. His name was Jehan Paulle alias Paule de Rege, and he was otherwise known as "Giovan Paulo".

When Jean d'Humières died suddenly in July 1550, he was succeeded as governor by Claude d'Urfé, who was given charge of the finances of the royal nursery, but the king confirmed Françoise d'Humières as main governess with the responsibility for his children. She quarreled with d'Urfé and the physicians appointed to attend the children. Her wage as governess of the Dauphin in 1553 was 1,200 Livres tournois.

Several letters are known between the king and queen and d'Humières regarding the upbringing of the royal children. In 1551, she used the signature "Françoise de Contay". She replied to a letter of Catherine de Medici in June 1552 to say that a painter had made portraits of her son and daughter and Mary, Queen of Scots.

== Sources ==
- Édouard, Sylvène (2009). Le Corps d'une reine: Histoire singulière d'Élisabeth de Valois (1546-1568) (in French). Presses universitaires de Rennes.
- Robert J. Knecht, Hero or Tyrant? Henry III, King of France, 1574-89
- Stoddart, Jane T, The girlhood of Mary queen of Scots from her landing in France in August 1548 to her departure from France in August 1561
- Keith Busby, Terry Nixon, Alison, Les Manuscrits de Chrétien de Troyes

Court offices
Preceded by Guillemette de Sarrebruck	Governess of the Children of France; 1544-1557	Succeeded by Louise de Clermont
