= Marie Isabelle Angélique de La Mothe-Houdancourt =

French royal governess

Marie de La Mothe-Houdancourt
- Duchess of La Ferté-Senneterre
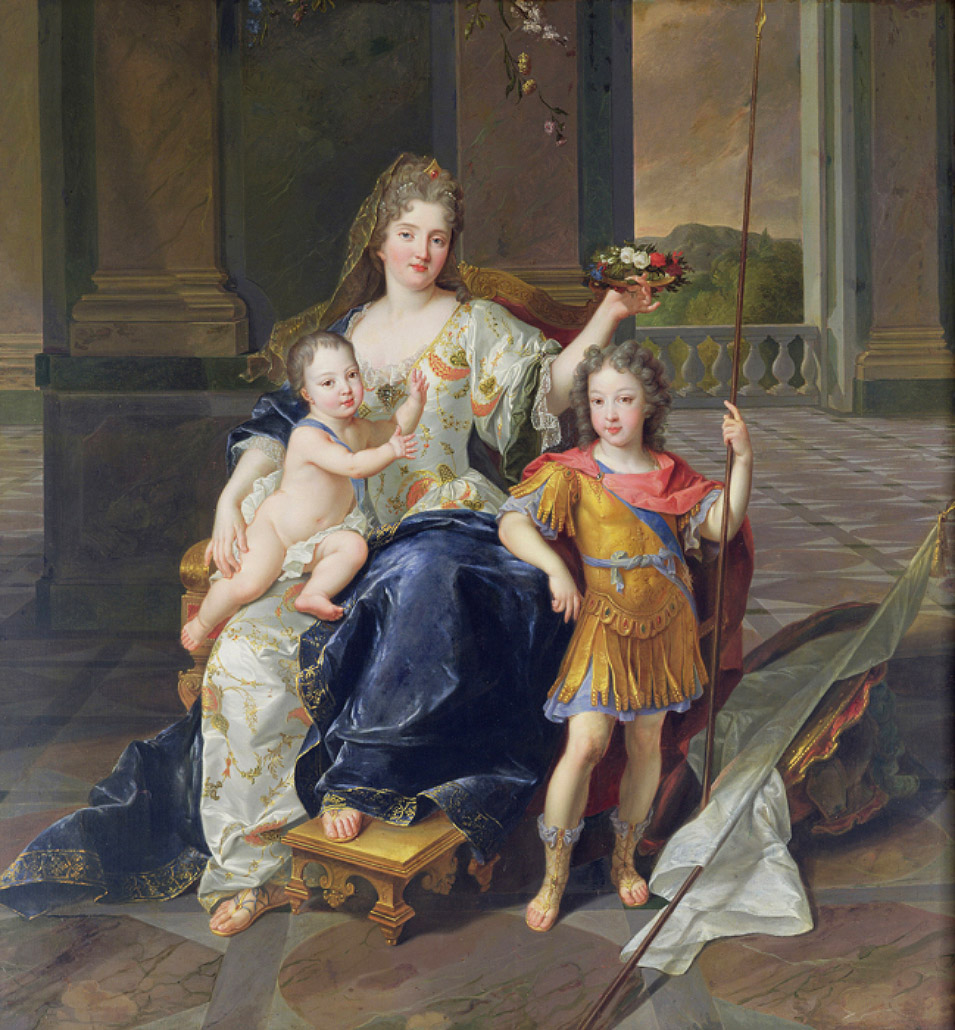
- Portrait by François de Troy depicting the Duchesse de La Ferté-Senneterre with Louis, Duke of Anjou (future Louis XV) on her lap and Louis, Duke of Brittany standing next to her.
- Full name: Marie Isabelle Gabrielle Angélique de Saint-Nectaire
- Born: Marie Isabelle Gabrielle Angélique de La Mothe-Houdancourt; 1654
- Died: 1726 (aged 71–72)
- Spouses: Henri François de Saint Nectaire, Duke of La Ferté-Senneterre
- Issue: Françoise Charlotte de Saint-Nectaire; Marquise de Lévis-Mirepoix
- Father: Philippe de La Mothe-Houdancourt, Duke of Cardona
- Mother: Louise de Prie

Marie Isabelle Gabrielle Angélique de Saint-Nectaire, Duchesse de La Ferté-Senneterre (née de La Mothe-Houdancourt; 1654–1726) was a French noblewoman and court official who served as the Governess of the Children of France from 1709 to 1710. One of her charges was the future King Louis XV during the first year of his life.

== Biography ==
Marie Isabelle Gabrielle Angélique de La Mothe-Houdancourt was born in 1654 to Philippe de La Mothe-Houdancourt and Louise de Prie. Her father was the Duke of Cardona and served as the Viceroy of Catalonia and as Marshal of France. Her mother was a member of the French court who served as the Royal Governess for the children of Louis XIV and Louis, Grand Dauphin. She had two sisters, Charlotte Eléonore (the duchess of Ventadour) and Françoise Angélique (the duchess of Aumont).

She married Henri François de Saint Nectaire, Duc de La Ferté-Senneterre and had two children, Françoise Charlotte de Saint-Nectaire and the Marquise de Lévis-Mirepoix. Through her marriage she was the Duchess of La Ferté-Senneterre.

From 1709 until 1710 she served as the Governess of the Children of France at Versailles, an office previously held by her mother. As Royal Governess, she was in charge of the education of the two sons of Louis, Duke of Burgundy. These were the Duke of Brittany and the Duke of Anjou who later became King Louis XV. She was succeeded in the role by her sister Charlotte Eléonore, Duchesse de Ventadour.

At the death of her mother in 1709, she inherited the Château de Montpoupon, which, after her death in 1726, would be inherited by her daughter, Françoise Charlotte.

Court offices
Preceded by Louise de Prie	Governess of the Children of France; 1709–1710	Succeeded by Madame de Ventadour
