= François de La Baume =

- comte de Suze
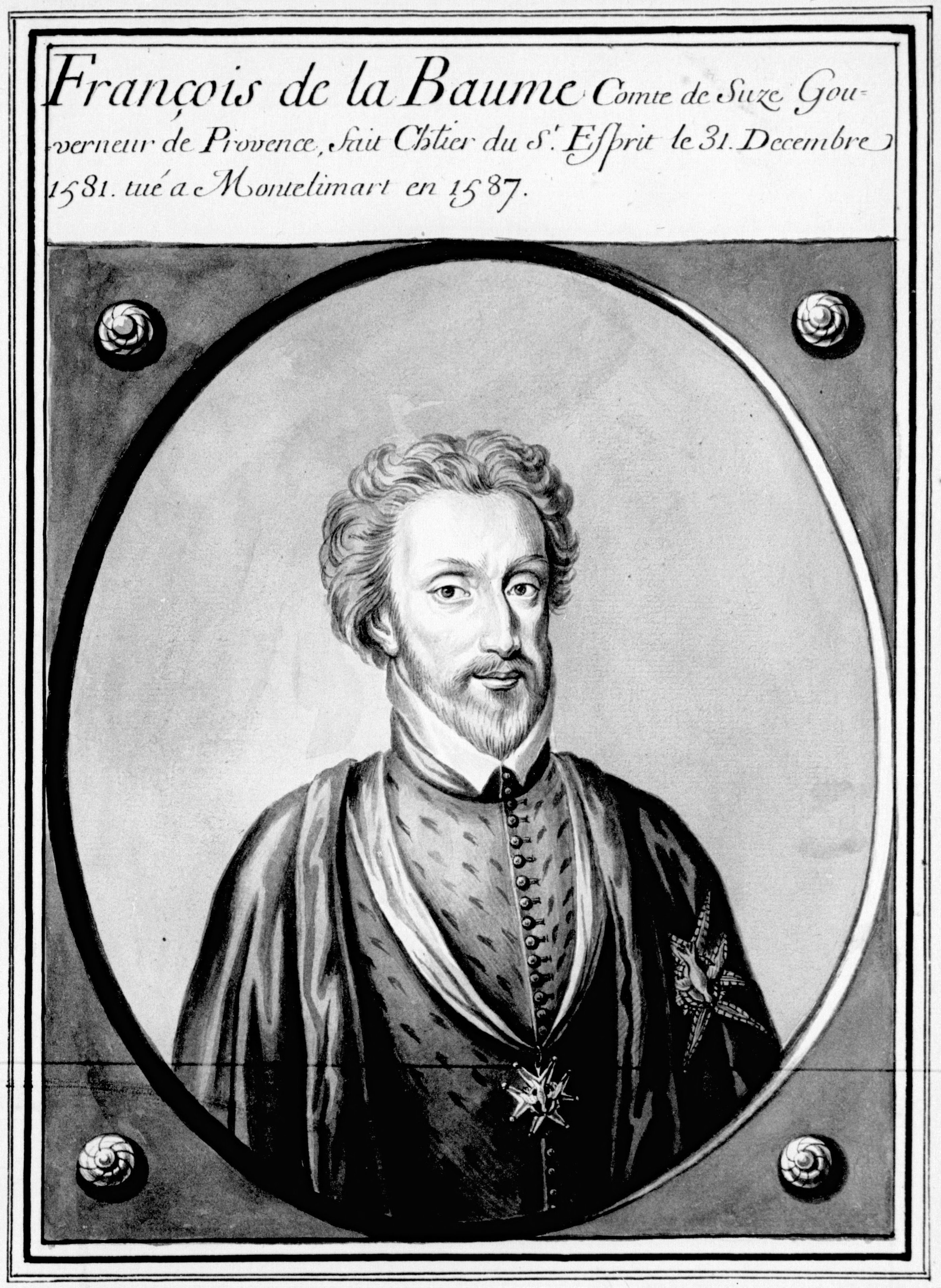
- Born: c. 1526
- Died: c. 1587
- Noble family: House of La Baume
- Spouse: Françoise de Lévis
- Issue: Rostaing de La Baume
- Father: Guillaume de La Baume

François de La Baume, comte de Suze (c. 1526-c. 1587) was a French noble, governor and military leader during the French Wars of Religion. Born in 1526, the son of Guillaume de La Baume, Suze was a Catholic noble, who fought for the crown in the fractious province of Provence, against leading Protestant military commanders, among them the baron des Adrets and Montbrun. During the second civil war he would face off against D'Acier who successfully forced him to cede control of the Rhône. In 1572 his barony was elevated to a county by royal patent. With La Rochelle threatening to enter rebellion in the wake of the Massacre of Saint Bartholomew, Suze was among those tasked by the king with negotiating the submission of the city to its royal governor, however he was unsuccessful in this and a siege followed.

By 1577 he was lieutenant general of Provence, and found himself faced with a factional war within the governorship, between supporters of the Razats and those loyal to Carcès. In 1578 he was elevated from lieutenant general of Provence to governor as Retz resigned his role in his favour. He found himself unable to control the violence, and several towns defected to the control of Carcès. In late 1578 Catherine travelled south to quiet the disorder that was engulfing Provence and many other southern regions. In May 1579 Suze submitted his resignation as governor to her, and she replaced him with the king's brother Henri d'Angoulême. After the establishment of the Ordre du Saint-Esprit, Suze received the collar of the new more prestigious order. He continued to fight for the crown in the civil wars of the 1580s, dying at a siege of Montélimar in 1587.

== Early life and family ==
François was born in 1526, the eldest son of Guillaume de La Baume. François was a member of a family which had been ennobled in the fourteenth century. His sister Marguerite, married Annet de Maugiron, this created an alliance between Suze, and the Maugiron family of Dauphiné. Therefore, he supported Louis de Maugiron on his entry to court, where he became a favourite of the king. After Maugiron's death during a duel in 1578, Suze imparted the news of the affair to the young man's father back in Dauphiné.

He married Françoise de Lévis, a daughter of Gilbert de Lévis, comte de Ventadour in 1551. Together they would have nine children, four sons and five daughters.

== Reign of Charles IX ==
=== French Wars of Religion ===
In the 1560s, Suze championed the interests of the House of Guise, inside the governorship of Dauphiné. During the first civil war, Suze remained loyal to the crown, and supported the royal commanders of the south in the fight against the Protestant insurgents, the baron des Adrets and Montbrun.

While the court was on its grand tour from 1564 to 1566, the court passed through Suze-la-Rousse where Suze was resident. As a sign of the favour in which his family resided, the king and his mother participated in the baptism of his recently born daughter, holding her at the baptismal font.

During the second civil war, Suze again campaigned in the south of France, he captured the strategic Pont-Saint-Esprit which controlled the crossing of the Rhône, hoping to trap the Protestant commander D'Acier on the other side, however d'Acier turned back and forced Suze to abandon his hold on the town.

Starting in 1568, the Ordre de Saint-Michel became increasingly decentralised in its awarding, with many local magnates granted the privilege to bestow the collar of the order on nobles of their choosing, outside the confines of an annual ceremony. Suze for his part was granted the honour of creating four members of the order between 1568 and 1570.

In the year of 1572, his barony of Suze was elevated to a county by royal patent.

=== La Rochelle ===
After the Massacre of Saint Bartholomew, the city of La Rochelle, horrified by what was unfolding across France, and increasingly filling with refugees, refused entry to the town to the baron de Biron, who had recently been appointed governor. Orders came from court to subdue the town back into obedience. As forces began to assemble outside the city negotiations took place between the leadership of the city, and the royal army. Suze was called to be involved in the final negotiations that were undertaken with La Rochelle, alongside La Vauguyon, Biron, La Noue and Monluc. The negotiations would be unsuccessful and a siege would begin.

== Reign of Henri III ==
=== Crisis in Provence ===
During 1577, Suze found himself in a tense situation, the province dominated by two rival military factions of the nobility, that of the 'Razats', who could count on the support of Lesdiguières and other Protestant rebels, and the faction of Catholic notables that coalesced around Carcès. The Parlement of Aix declared itself in support of Carcès and several towns defected to the count. Suze became governor of Provence on 1 June 1578, succeeding one of Catherine's favourites, Retz in the position. Retz had resigned the governorship on the understanding it would be given to him, this practice was becoming increasingly controversial in the 1570s, and had been protested against at the recent Estates General. Alongside the position of governor he also acquired that of Admiral of the Levant. The troubles of the Razats, in combination with other disorders which were affecting the other southern provinces, ravaged by decades of civil war, came to the attention of the court. The king dispatched his mother Catherine south in 1578, and she visited Guyenne, Dauphiné and Provence. While in Provence in May, Suze offered his resignation to the queen mother. She oversaw the appointment of a new governor for Provence, who would be better able to control the factions of the region. As such after serving in the role for only a year, Suze ceded the position of governor to the bastard Angoulême, an illegitimate brother of king Charles.

=== Saint-Esprit ===
In 1578, Henri III established a new order to replace the Ordre de Saint-Michel, which had become diluted in prestige by the expansions made in the late 1560s. To this end he established the Ordre du Saint-Esprit. Suze would be a recipient of this new honour.

In 1582 he provided financial support to François d'O, after the former favourite had been removed from access to royal patronage, loaning d'O 12,000 livres.

=== Death ===
Suze died during the eighth war of religion, of wounds he received at the siege of Montélimar in 1587. He would be succeeded to his titles by his eldest surviving son Rostaing de La Baume.

== Sources ==
- Albiousse, Lionel (1887). Histoire des ducs d'Uzès, : suivie d'une notice sur leur château ducal. H Champion.
- Allard, Guy (1680). Histoire généalogique des familles de Revilasc, Gandil, Fassion, Precomtal, Saint-Marcel, Vauserre, Bardonnenche, Merindol, Baudet, Yse, Lancellin, La Baume-de-Suze, Beaumont. Grenoble.
- Chevallier, Pierre (1985). Henri III: Roi Shakespearien. Fayard.
- Cloulas, Ivan (1979). Catherine de Médicis. Fayard.
- Harding, Robert (1978). Anatomy of a Power Elite: the Provincial Governors in Early Modern France. Yale University Press.
- Knecht, Robert (2014). Catherine de' Medici. Routledge.
- Le Roux, Nicolas (2000). La Faveur du Roi: Mignons et Courtisans au Temps des Derniers Valois. Champ Vallon.
