= Louise de Clermont =

French noble

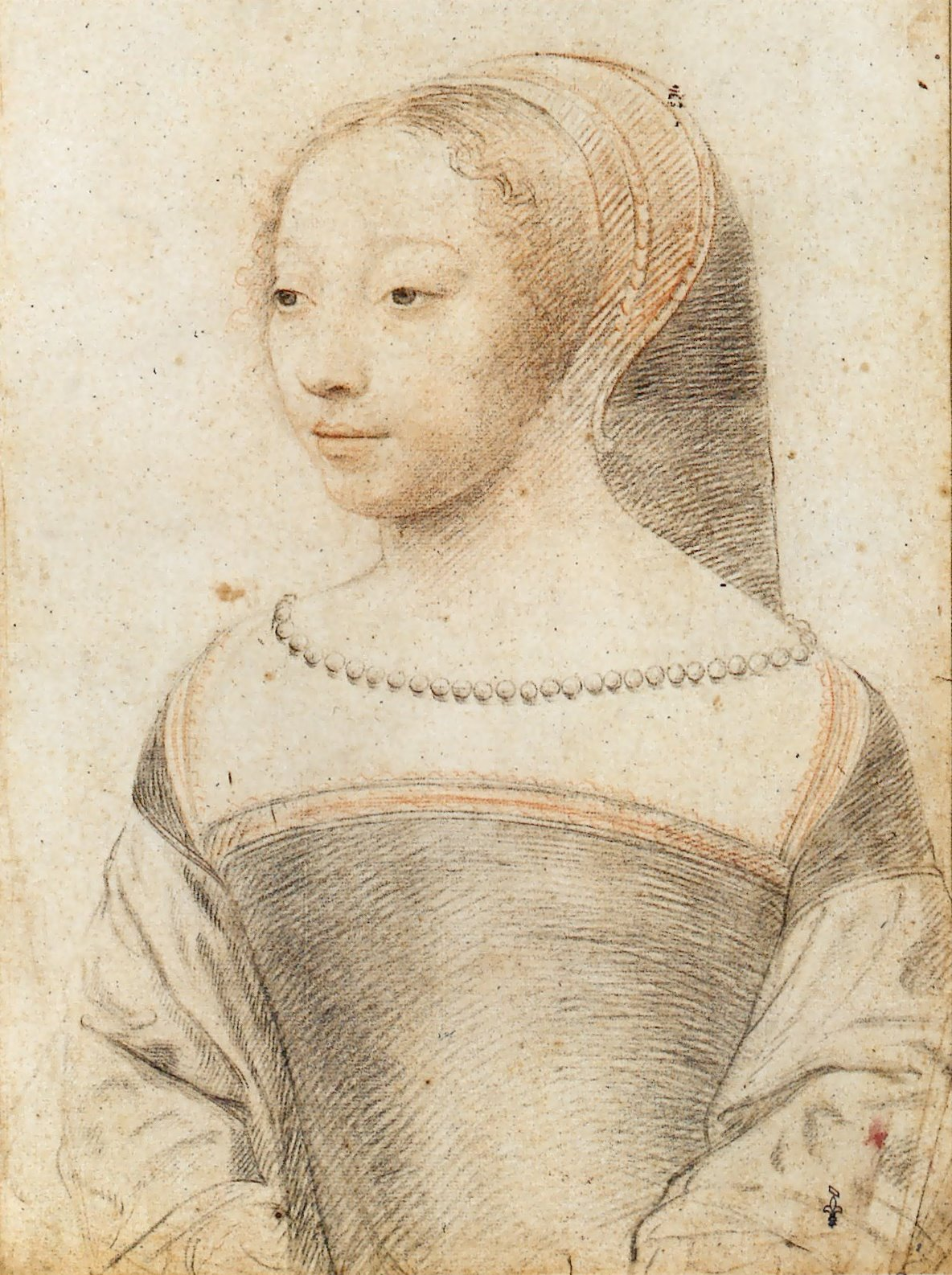
Louise de Clermont

Louise de Clermont-Tallard, Countess of Tonnerre by inheritance and duchess of Uzès by marriage was a French court official. She was a lady-in-waiting of queen regent Catherine de Medici of France and a royal governess of king Charles IX of France. She was an influential figure at the French royal court as the favourite of the queen-regent and a member of the intimate circle of the royal family.

== Life ==
Louise de Clermont was the daughter of Bernardin de Clermont and Anne de Husson. She married François du Bellay (died 1554) in 1539, and Antoine de Crussol in 1556. She was a maid-of-honour to the queen mother Louise of Savoy prior to her marriage. She met Catherine de Medici in 1533 and became one of her personal friends and confidantes from this point on. In 1552, she was formally appointed lady-in-waiting to queen Catherine. She was appointed governess to the royal children.

Court offices
Preceded by Françoise d'Humières	Governess of the Children of France	Succeeded by Claude Catherine de Clermont
