= Villers-sur-Trie =

- Part of Trie-Château
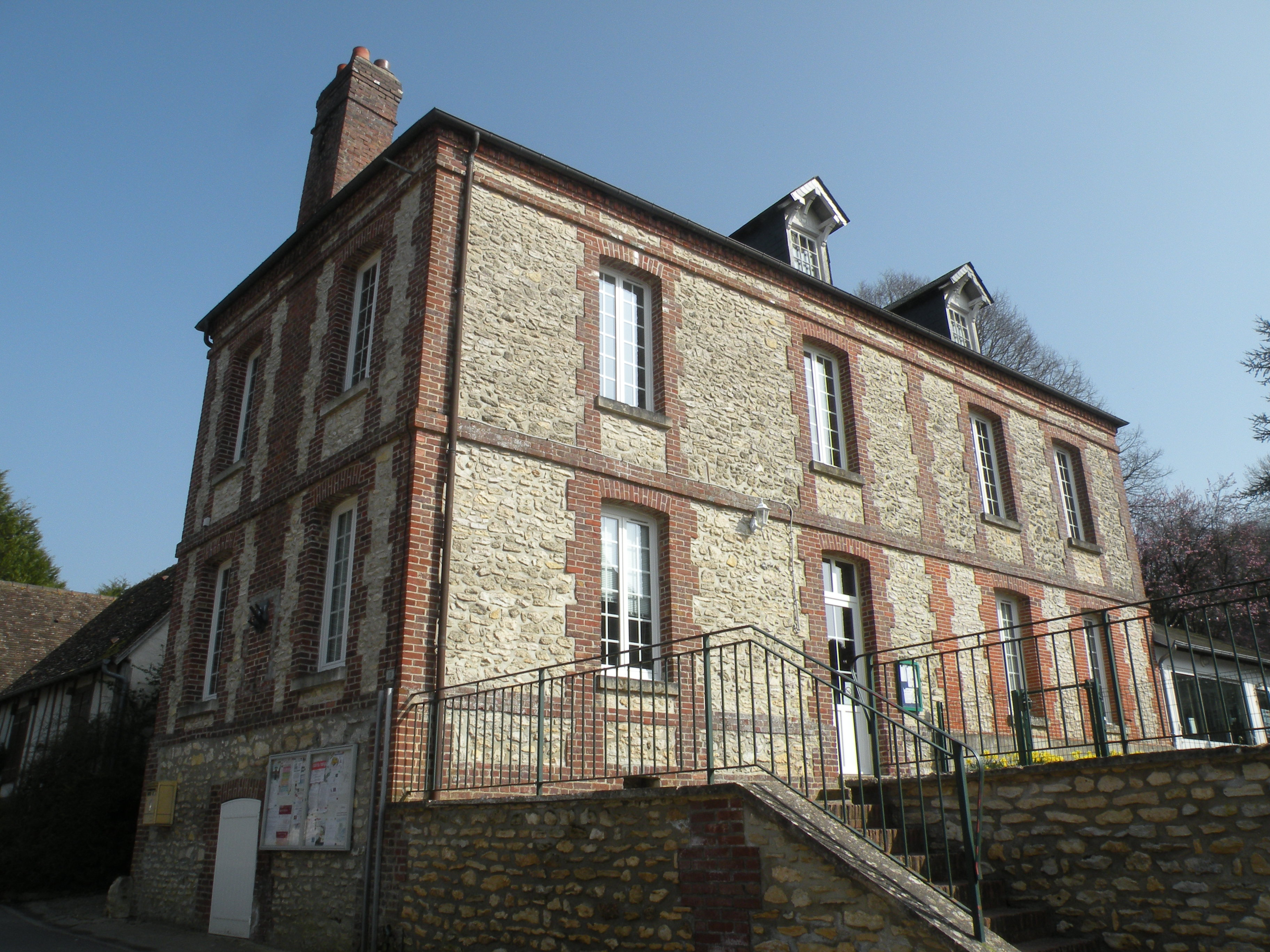
- Town hall
- Location of Villers-sur-Trie
- Location within France Location within Hauts-de-France
- Coordinates: 49°18′28″N 1°49′25″E
- Country: France
- Region: Hauts-de-France
- Department: Oise
- Arrondissement: Beauvais
- Canton: Chaumont-en-Vexin
- Commune: Trie-Château
- Area^{1}: 4.05 km^{2} (1.56 sq mi)
- Elevation: 120 m (390 ft)
- Highest elevation: 132 m (433 ft)
- Lowest elevation: 69 m (226 ft)
- Population (2019): 322
  - Density: 79.5/km^{2} (206/sq mi)
- Time zone: UTC+01:00 (CET)
  - Summer (DST): UTC+02:00 (CEST)
- Postal code: 60590
- ^{1} French Land Register data, which excludes lakes, ponds, glaciers > 1 km^{2} (0.386 sq mi or 247 acres) and river estuaries.

Villers-sur-Trie (French pronunciation: [vilɛʁ syʁ tʁi]) is a former commune in the Oise department in northern France. On 1 January 2018, it was merged into the commune of Trie-Château.

== See also ==
- Communes of the Oise department
