= Palazzo Gondi =

Coordinates: 43°46′11″N 11°15′26″E

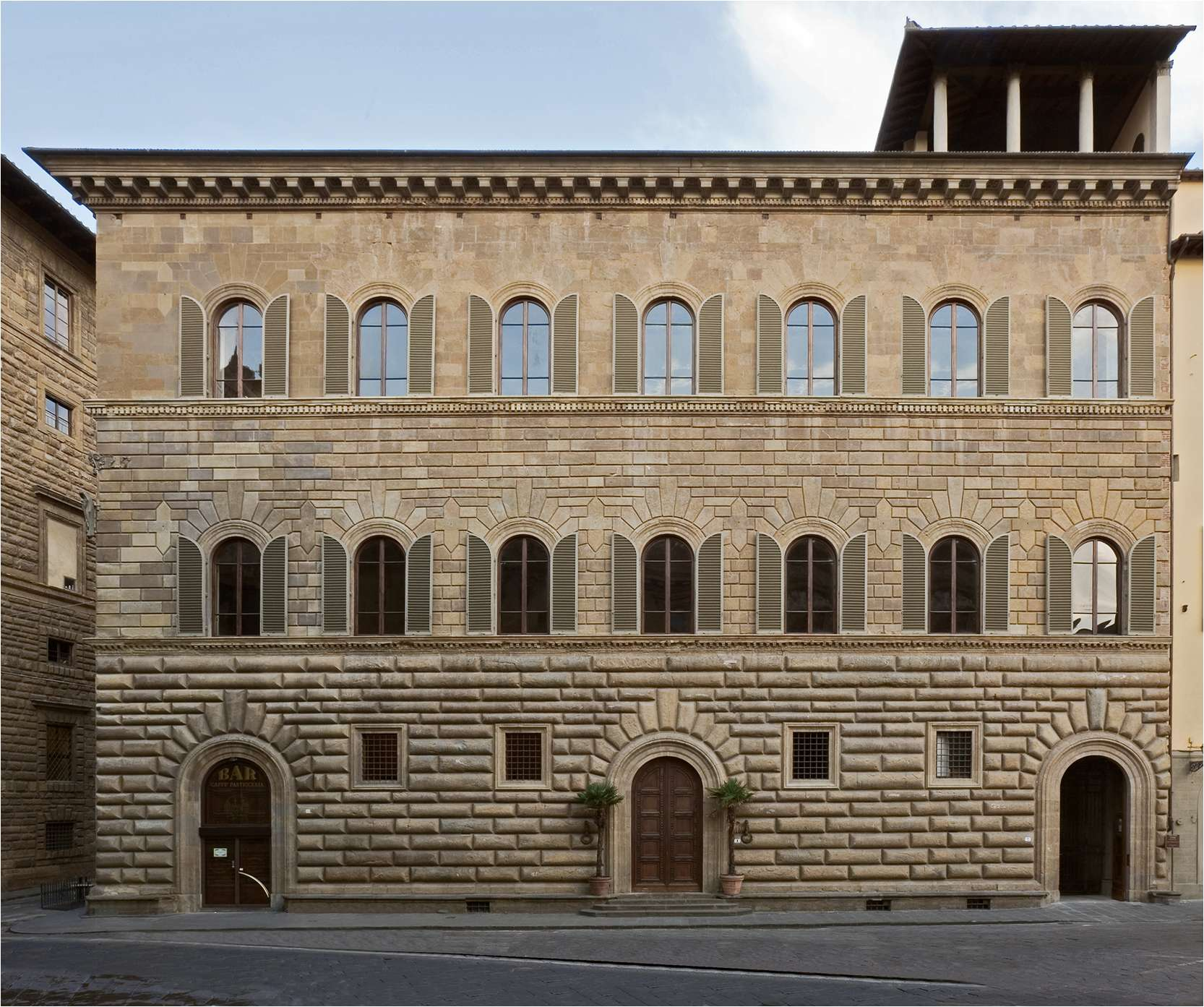
Palazzo Gondi

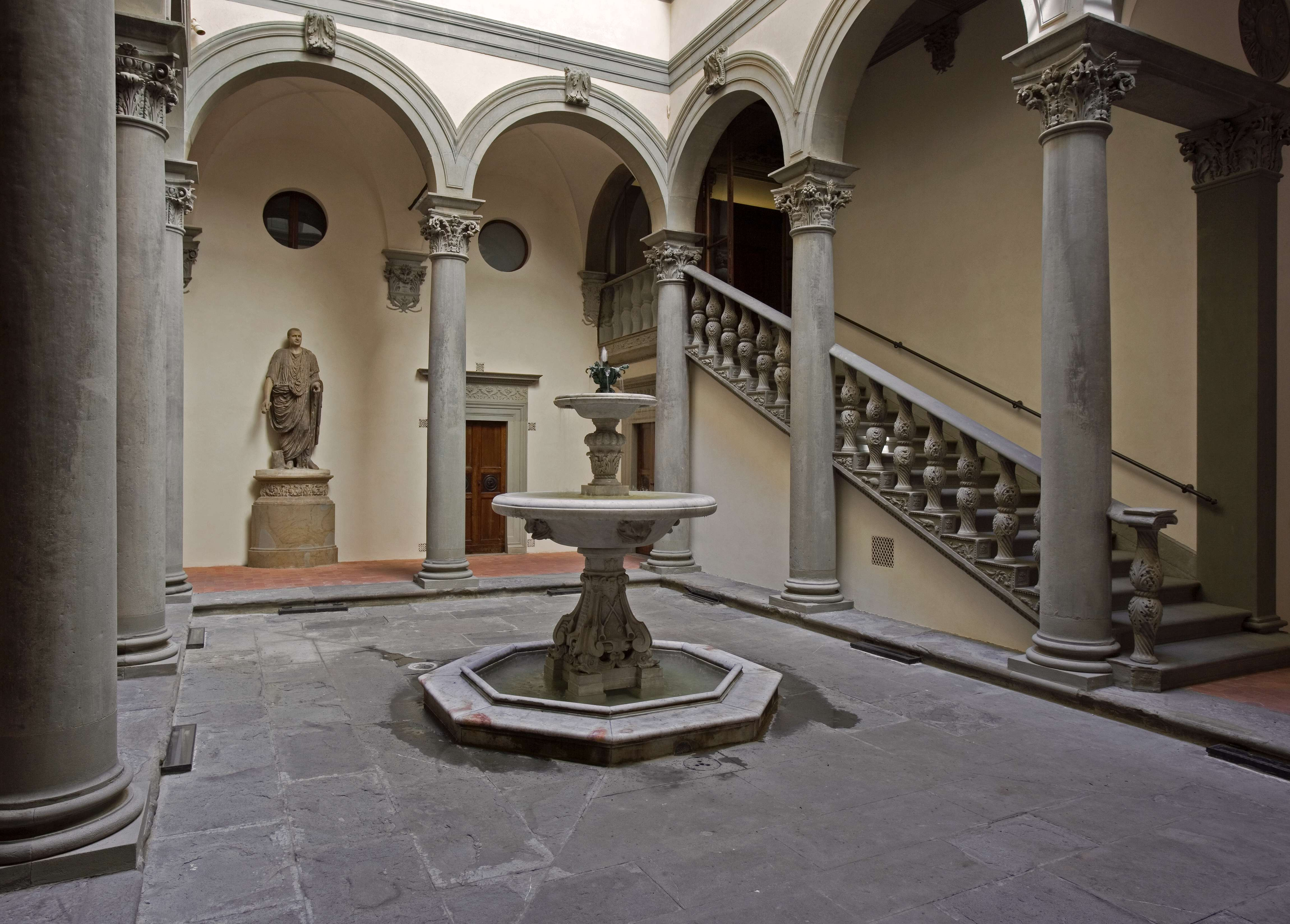
Interior courtyard with fountain, staircase and a 2nd century togatus

Palazzo Gondi is a palace in Florence, Italy, located a block from Piazza della Signoria. It was built in 1490 after a design by Giuliano da Sangallo, who was inspired by other major works of stately buildings in the city, such as Palazzo Medici and Palazzo Strozzi. Among the elements borrowed from these earlier works are the cube-shape set around a central courtyard, the ashlar sloping on each of three floors, and the arched windows. It is still the house of the noble Gondi family.

Compared to his models, however, Sangallo was able to modify the use of these elements, making it one of the most successful Florentine buildings of its time. The most innovative element is in the design of the windows: the profile of stones arranged in a radial pattern, which resemble the facets of a precious stone. The windows on the second floor were designed slightly wider than the others to compensate for the optical foreshortening.

The construction dragged on, and the building remained incomplete for several centuries. At the end of the 17th century Antonio Maria Ferri worked on the architecture and Matteo Bonechi on the paintings. The building was flanked by an old family house belonging to the Asini family, demolished around 1870 to widen the road along Palazzo Vecchio. On that occasion the building was also expanded with the creation of the third door (the left) and the construction of a new "slice" of the building that increased the number of windows on the facade, creating a similar perspective on Via de' Gondi. Accommodation on the south side had been designed by Giuseppe Poggi, the architect of Piazzale Michelangelo, but was demolished in 1874. Leonardo da Vinci had lived in one of the destroyed houses and is said to have painted the Mona Lisa there. Today the building still belongs to descendants of the family, but on the ground floor are a bar and other businesses.

In the central courtyard, a portico with Corinthian columns on four sides, there is a 17th-century fountain, which uses water from the Boboli Gardens which also supplies the Fountain of Neptune on the Piazza della Signoria. From here begins the monumental staircase to the upper floors. Across the entrance stands a statue of a Roman togatus from the 2nd century AD, so-called Macrino, that was found at the Roman theatre in Florence.

Among the decorations inside the palace, there is a fresco and some paintings by Italian and French artists. On the first floor there is also a monumental fireplace which was designed by Sangallo.
