= Giuliano da Sangallo =

Italian sculptor

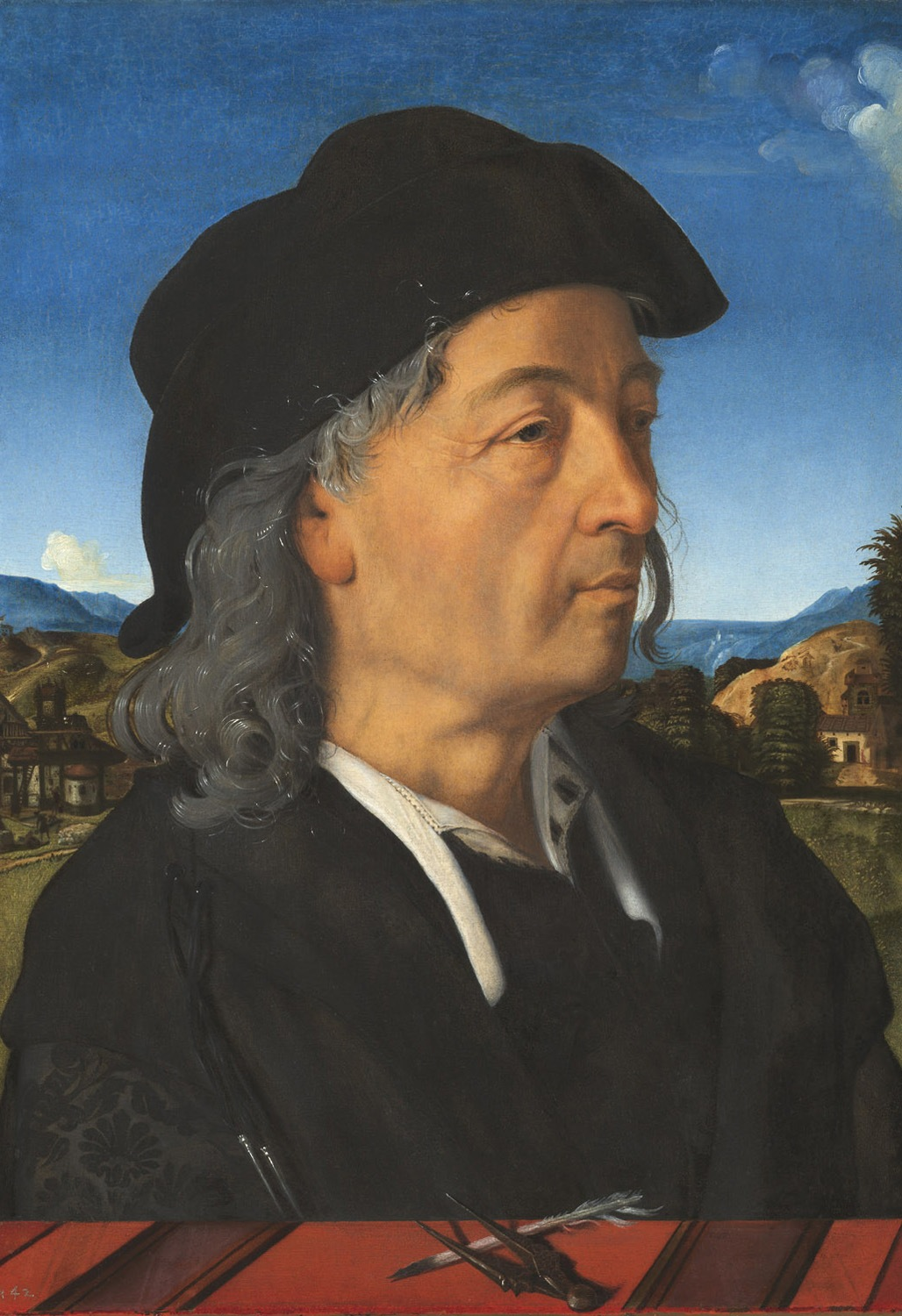
Portrait by Piero di Cosimo, c. 1482-1485 (Rijksmuseum, Amsterdam)

Giuliano da Sangallo (c. 1445 – 1516) was an Italian sculptor, architect and military engineer active during the Italian Renaissance. He is known primarily for being the favoured architect of Lorenzo de' Medici, his patron. In this role, Giuliano designed a villa for Lorenzo as well as a monastery for Augustinians and a church where a miracle was said to have taken place. Additionally, Giuliano was commissioned to build multiple structures for Pope Julius II and Pope Leo X. Leon Battista Alberti and Filippo Brunelleschi heavily influenced Sangallo and in turn, he influenced other important Renaissance figures such as Raphael, Leonardo da Vinci, his brother Antonio da Sangallo the Elder, and his sons, Antonio da Sangallo the Younger and Francesco da Sangallo.

== Early life ==
Giuliano da Sangallo (né Giuliano Giamberti) was born c. 1445 in Florence. His father, Francesco Giamberti, was a woodworker and an architect who worked closely with Cosimo de' Medici. This proved to be helpful to Giuliano and his brother, Antonio, later in life, as it helped them to develop a close working relationship and friendship with Cosimo's grandson, Lorenzo de' Medici. As a child, Giuliano became an apprentice to a joiner. As an apprentice, his woodworking, building and sculpting skills drew the attention of Lorenzo de' Medici. In addition to his work as a joiner's apprentice, Giuliano had the opportunity to study the works of ancient architects as well as his more immediate predecessors such as Leon Battista Alberti and Filippo Brunelleschi. Through this, he was able to develop his creative eye, learn about classical design, and also develop what became a lifelong business relationship with Lorenzo de' Medici. Giuliano's first major, independent commission came from the Medici family, and it showed not only his architectural skill, but also his knowledge of defensive fortifications. Lorenzo the Magnificent called upon Giuliano to build military fortifications and manage the artillery in the town of Castellina against an invasion led by the Duke of Calabria. In this role, Giuliano successfully pushed out the Calabrian forces and showed his natural talent for military building and strategy.

== Major works ==
=== Medici Villa at Poggio a Caiano ===
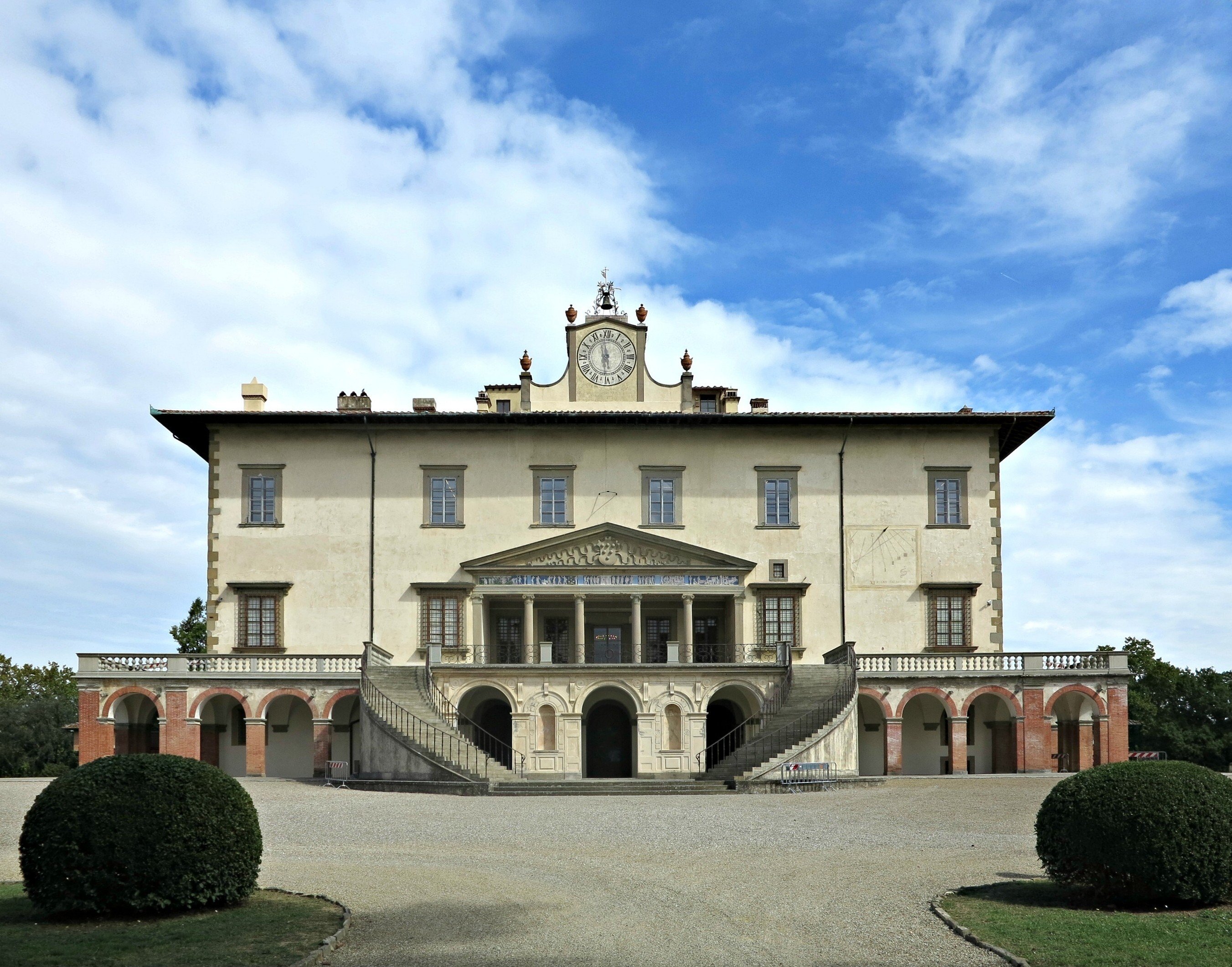
Villa Medici at Poggio a Caiano

The victory at Calabria gave Lorenzo de' Medici confidence to keep working with Giuliano. Consequently, Lorenzo commissioned him to design a villa in Poggio a Caiano after holding a competition to determine the best design. Construction on the villa began in 1485 and remained largely unfinished throughout Lorenzo's life. His son, Giovanni, oversaw its completion after being elected pope as Pope Leo X. Giuliano's design featured classical design elements including Ionic columns and an ancient temple style façade. The Medici Villa in Poggia a Caiano is one of the oldest examples of Renaissance-style country villas and served as an inspiration for many future architects of the era.

=== Santa Maria delle Carceri ===
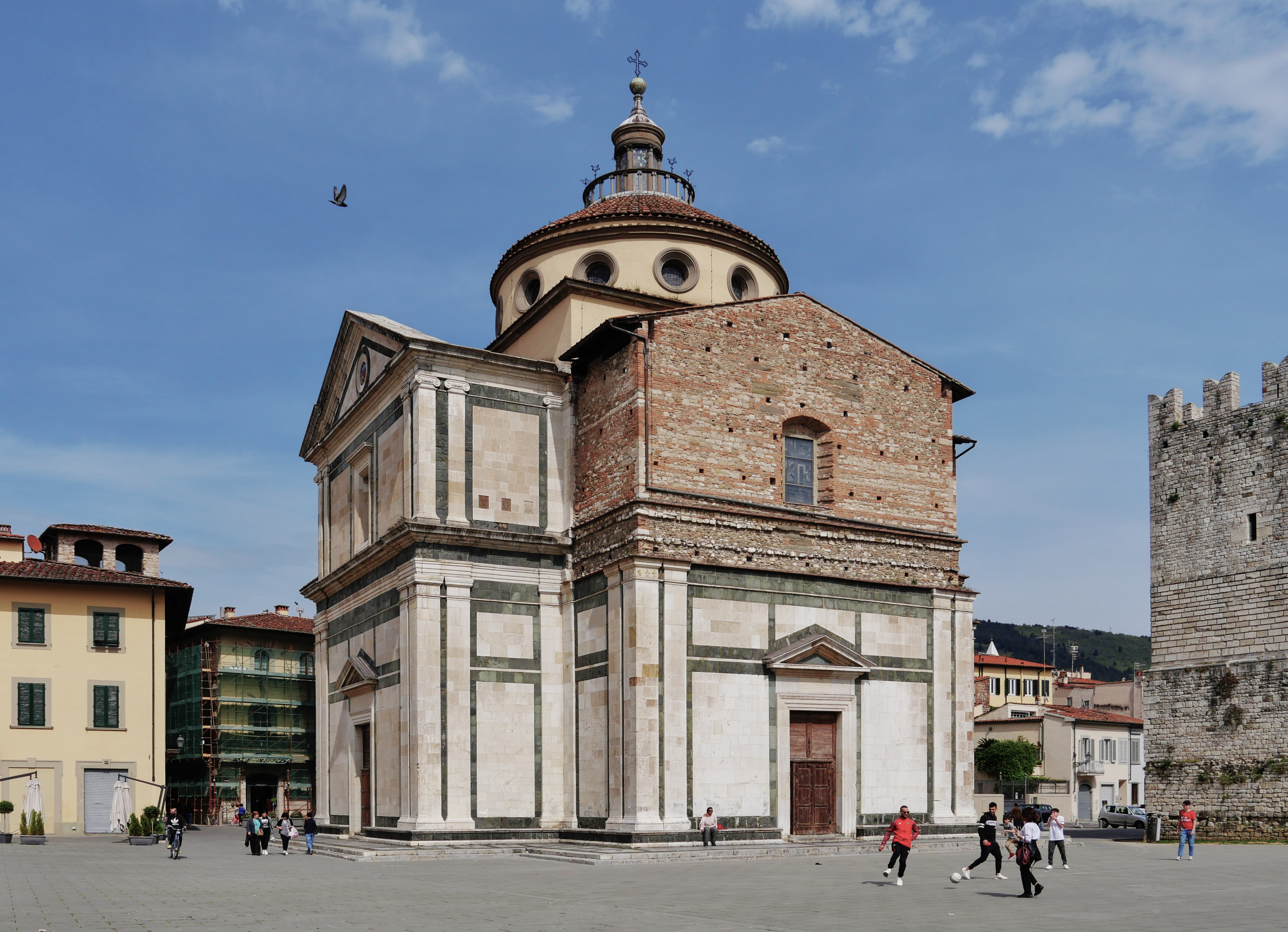
The unfinished façade of Santa Maria delle Carceri

In 1484, a child from the town of Prato claimed to have seen a painting of the Virgin Mary and an infant Jesus come to life on the side of the public jail. Santa Maria delle Carceri was commissioned after the townspeople declared this a miracle and decided that a church should be built at the site of the vision to commemorate it. For this project, Lorenzo de' Medici once again hired his favourite architect, Giuliano. His designs relied heavily on his study of the work of Alberti and Brunelleschi. Specifically, Sangallo used a Greek cross plan. This is a classical layout design that features four arms of equal length extending off of a central nave, and it had not been used extensively in the Renaissance before that point. Construction began on the church in 1486, but the façade remains unfinished to this day.

=== Reggia in Naples ===
In 1488, after the initial plans were set for the villa in Poggia a Caiano, Lorenzo de' Medici commissioned Giuliano to build a castle for Ferrante of Aragon, the King of Naples. The building of the castle was part of a larger political plan that the leaders of the different city-states of Renaissance Italy engaged in. When city-states were not warring with each other, they would send gifts as well as painters, sculptors, and architects to each other as diplomatic displays of good faith. Additionally, by sending Giuliano to Naples, the Medici family was attempting to export Florentine culture and architecture across the Italian Peninsula. Giuliano sought to build the castle near the open land by Castel Nuovo. Unfortunately, the castle was never built, but his sketches of the plan still remain. The palace design featured elements similar to those of Giuliano's first major commission, the Medici Villa. Similar elements between the Medici Villa and the castle in Naples include the raised platform on which the structures were built, two stairways leading to the main entrance, and a portico between the two stairways. Furthermore, both structures were built on a rectangular, symmetrical axis. After Giuliano completed his service for the king, he was sent back to Florence with gifts, including money, paintings, and sculptures. Giuliano gave many of these gifts to Lorenzo de' Medici as a showing of appreciation for being his patron.

While Sangallo was designing the palace for the King of Naples, the King's son, the Duke of Calabria, wrote to Lorenzo de' Medici asking for a palace design as well. In response to this letter, Lorenzo sent another Giuliano, Giuliano da Maiano, to design his palace. Giorgio Vasari, the Renaissance author who wrote biographies of most Renaissance artists in Lives of the Most Excellent Painters, Sculptors, and Architects, falsely attributes the Duke of Calabria's palace to Giuliano da Sangallo. Also according to Vasari, after working in Naples, the Bishop of Ostia, later known as Pope Julius II, hired Giuliano to re-fortify his castle in Ostia. It is true that Sangallo worked on this project, but he did it along with another architect, Baccio Pontelli. Additionally, according to inscriptions in the castle, the renovation was completed in 1484, before Giuliano started working for the King of Naples.

=== Church of San Gallo ===
After Giuliano returned from Naples, Lorenzo commissioned him once again to build a church for a group of Augustinian monks. This commission was meant to be used as an example of Medici family public patronage in Florence. Based on correspondences during that time, historians have inferred that construction began on the church in 1488. Chiesa di San Gallo was dedicated to the seventh-century saint, Saint Gall of Ireland. According to Giorgio Vasari, Lorenzo loved the design so much that he started referring to Giuliano as Giuliano da San Gallo. Eventually, the name caught on and Giuliano jokingly told Lorenzo that his actual surname, Giamberti, would be forgotten. Lorenzo responded by telling him that he was worthy of starting a new family line with the name Sangallo. In addition to this, the gate in the Florence city wall closest to the church became known as Porta San Gallo. During the 1529 Siege of Florence, the Florentine army retreated within the walls of the city. Unfortunately, since the church was built outside of the city walls, it was destroyed.

=== Palazzo Gondi ===
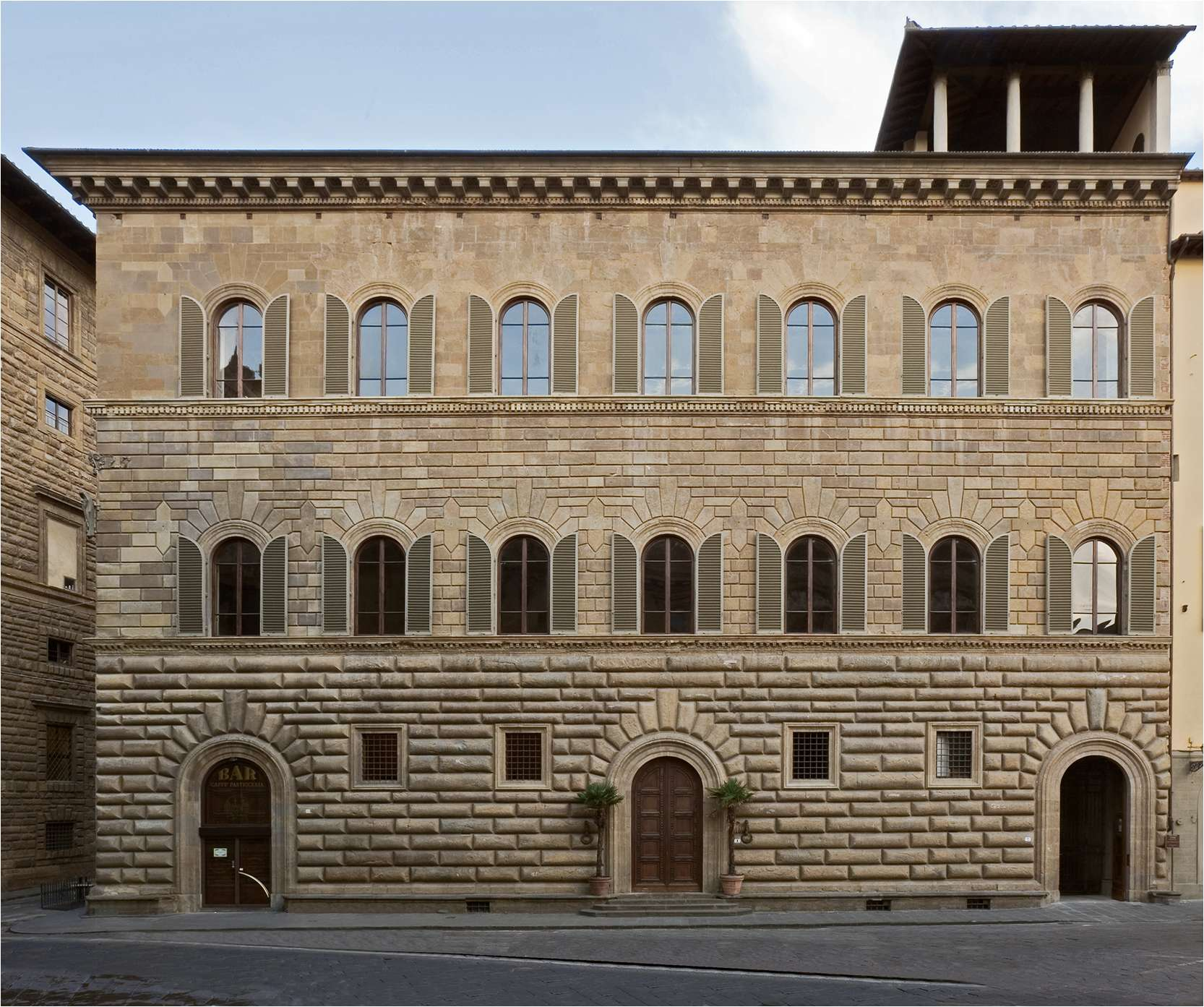
Palazzo Gondi

Around the same time that Giuliano da Sangallo was commissioned to build the Church of San Gallo, he was also commissioned by a wealthy Florentine merchant, Giuliano Gondi, of the old, Florentine banking Gondi family. After hearing of Sangallo's work for the Medici family and the King of Naples, Gondi requested that he build a new Palazzo Gondi in Florence. For this project, Giuliano relied on the design of the other large palaces in the city, such as the Palazzo Medici Riccardi and Palazzo Strozzi. Like both of those palaces, the Palazzo Gondi featured the use of finer levels of stone on each ascending level of the façade. Unfortunately, like many of his commissions, this palace was not finished within Giuliano's lifetime or within the lifetime of his patron, Giuliano Gondi. The palace continued to be renovated and expanded for almost two more centuries. Because of these renovations, historians have been unable to definitively identify Sangallo's original plan.

=== Palazzo della Rovere ===
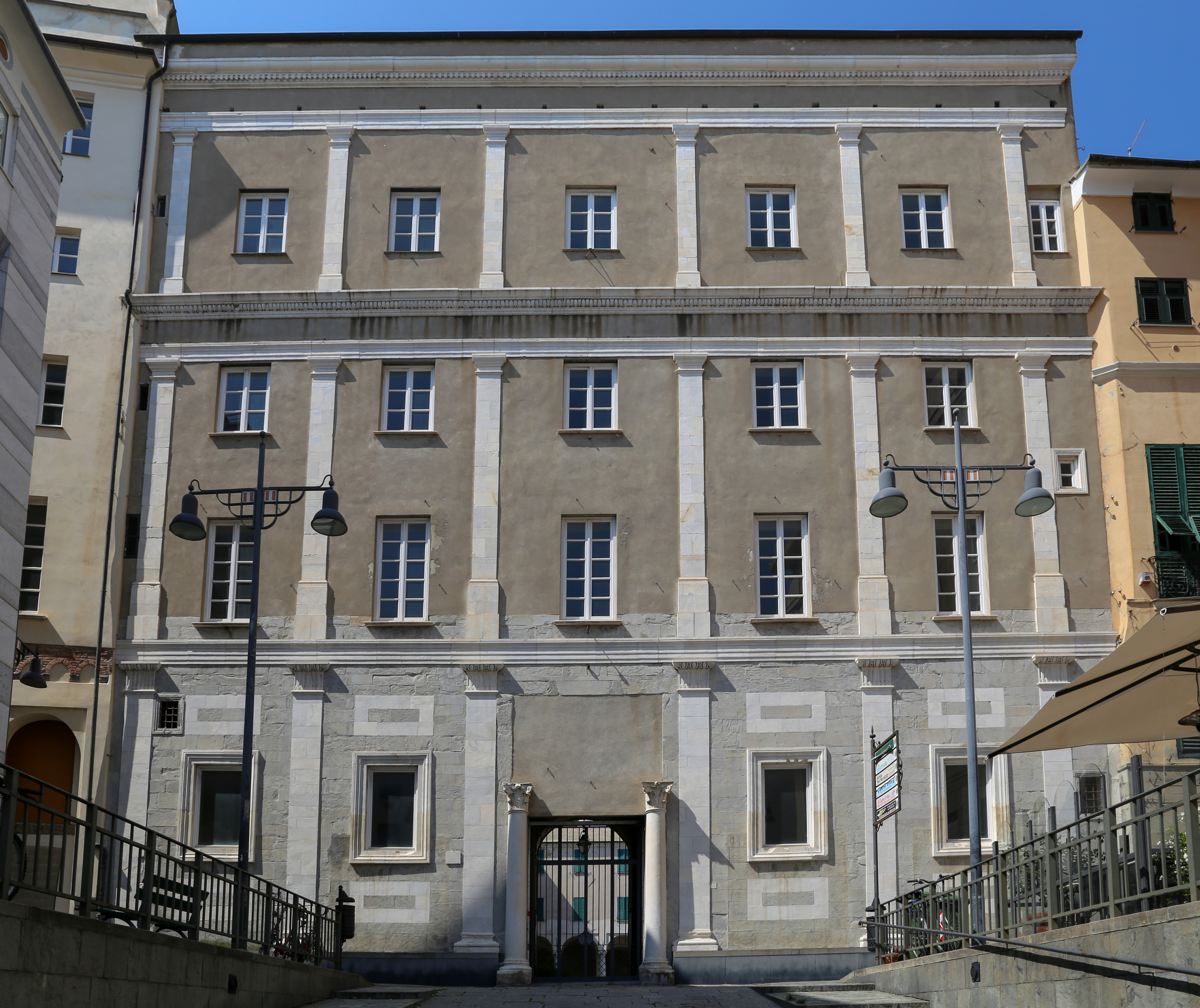
Palazzo della Rovere in Savona

Shortly after Giuliano completed his work on Santa Maria delle Carceri, his patron and longtime friend Lorenzo died in 1492. After the death of Lorenzo the Magnificent, a power vacuum was created that allowed an opportunity for France to invade Florence in 1494. The French invasion forced the Medici family and their followers, including Giuliano, out of Florence and into exile. Two years previously, the Bishop of Ostia, Giuliano della Rovere, had fled Italy after his rival in the church, Rodrigo Borgia, was elected Pope as Alexander VI in 1492. Using the shared exile and his past history as a patron of architecture, he convinced Sangallo to design a palace in Savona for him.

The palace design was greatly influenced by the Bishop's other estates, such as the one in Vincoli and the fortress in Ostia that Sangallo helped renovate. Giuliano della Rovere was fueled by a rivalry with his cousin, Rafaelle della Rovere, to make his palace in Savona the biggest that the city had seen. Della Rovere achieved this by purchasing the properties surrounding the family estate. Like Alberti's design for the Palazzo Rucellai in Florence, Sangallo reconciled the fact that the palazzo was made up of multiple buildings by creating one large, towering façade. Also like the Palazzo Rucellai, Sangallo used the concept of reducing the size of each ascending level of the façade in order to make it appear more imposing from street level.

== Late career and death ==
Giuliano's final work was to assist in the design and construction of the new St. Peter's Basilica. Sangallo was called upon to design the new church. Pope Julius II, however, appointed Donato Bramante instead, and construction began in 1506. Giuliano was called by Julius II to help Michelangelo remove mould from the Sistine Chapel ceiling after the younger artist had applied too wet a plaster. After Giuliano's distinguished career and close working relationship with Julius II, Bramante's promotion left Giuliano devastated and he left Rome for Florence. After the death of Julius II and the subsequent election of Giovanni de' Medici to the papacy in 1513 as Pope Leo X, along with the death of Bramante in 1514, Giuliano was recalled to Rome from Florence to help rebuild the basilica. By this time, however, Giuliano was over 70 years old and not well enough to travel back to Rome and oversee a project of such magnitude. Therefore, Pope Leo X selected another distinguished artist, Raphael, to assume control of the design of the new basilica.

Giuliano died in Florence in 1516.

== Legacy ==
Giuliano's legacy is unlike other architects of the era, because many of his largest works remain either unfinished or are no longer standing at all, such as Santa Maria delle Carceri, Palazzo Gondi, and the Church of San Gallo. Instead, his legacy is largely based on more abstract concepts. Sangallo's legacy remains through his Sienese Sketchbook. This sketchbook provides an intimate look into Sangallo's mind. It includes ideas he had for concepts ranging from new forms of artillery to cathedral domes to sculptures. Many of these designs were accompanied by measurements and technical details. Additionally, the sketchbook features drawings Sangallo did of already existing structures that he saw on his travels throughout Italy and Europe. Based on this, it appears that Sangallo was also interested in the study of medieval architecture as well as classical architecture.

In addition to the sketchbook, the name Sangallo came to be associated with high-quality architecture because of Giuliano's impressive career. After his reputation grew, other architects of the time adopted Sangallo as a name to try to associate themselves with Giuliano's skill and ability.

== Sources ==
- Guagliumi, Silvia (2016). Giuliano da Sangallo architettore, Tau Editrice, ISBN 978-88-6244-479-8.
- Chisholm, Hugh, ed. (1911). "Sangallo s.v. Giuliano di Sangallo" . Encyclopædia Britannica. Vol. 24 (11th ed.). Cambridge University Press. pp. 148–149.
