= Antoinette d'Orléans-Longueville =

French noble lady (1572–1618)

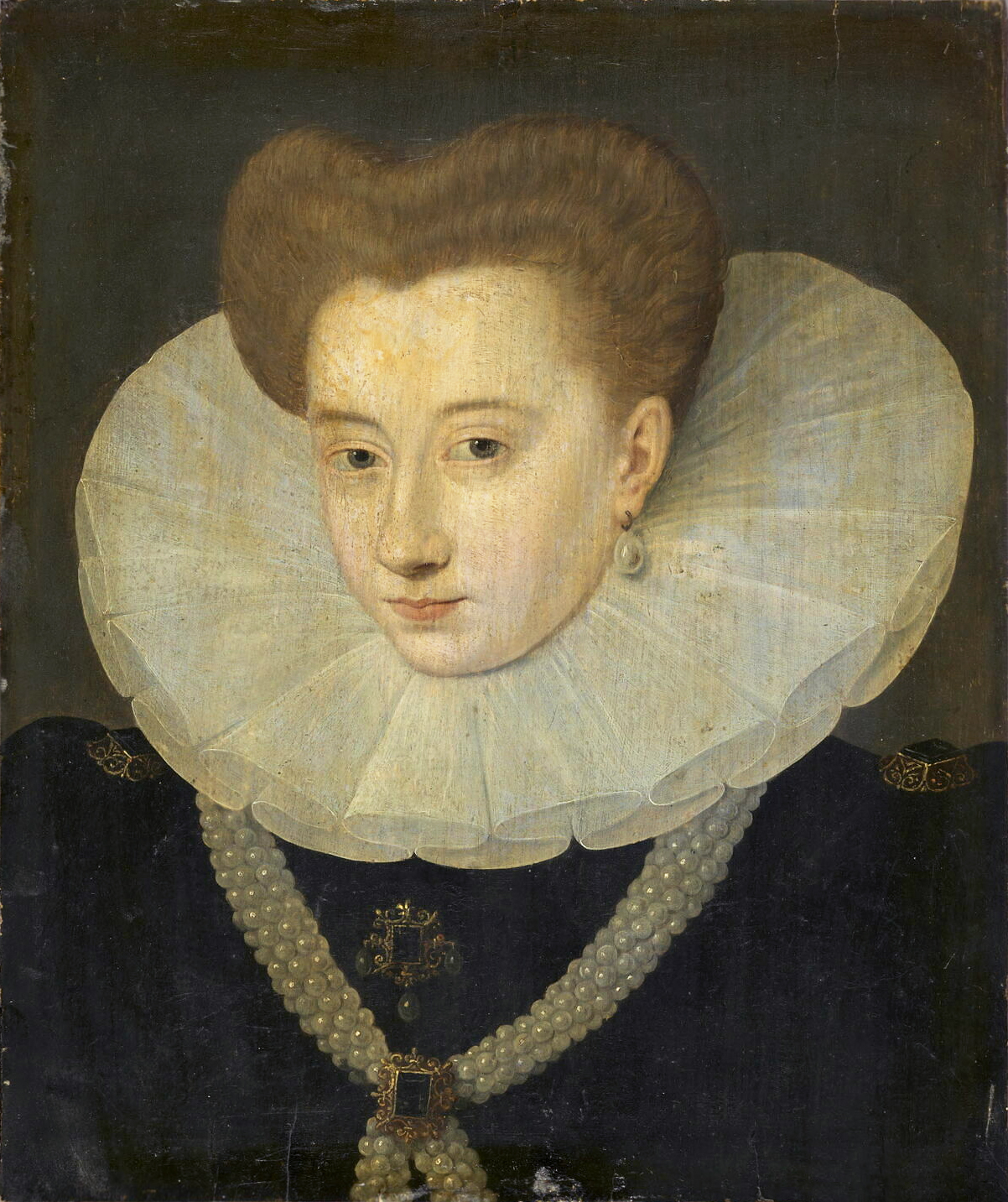
- Portrait in the Louvre Museum
- Born: 1572; Trie-Château (Oise), France
- Died: 24 April 1618 (aged 45–46); Poitiers, France
- Other name: Sister Antoinette of Saint Scholastica
- Occupations: Noble woman, nun
- Spouse: Charles de Gondi
- Children: Two
- Parents: Léonor d'Orléans-Longueville (father); Marie de Bourbon (mother)

Antoinette d'Orléans-Longueville (1572–24 April 1618) was a French noble lady, of Capetian ancestry, member of the house of Orléans-Longueville. She was Lady of Château-Gontier and, through her marriage, became the Marquise of Belle-Île. Widowed as a young woman, the wealthy lady became a nun and eventually founded the Benedictine order of Notre-Dame of Calvary in Paris.

== Biography ==
Antoinette d'Orléans-Longueville was born in 1572 in Trie-Château (Oise) in northern France. Her father was Léonor d'Orléans-Longueville (1540–1573), Duke of Longueville and Estouteville, Count of Neuchatel, de Tancarville and Montgomery, baron de Varenguebec, lord of Trie-Château, peer of France, Grand Chamberlain of France, governor of Picardy, constable and chamberlain of Normandy. Her mother was Marie de Bourbon (1539–1601), Duchess of Estouteville, Countess of Saint-Pol, Countess of Gacé, of Hambye and of Bricquebec. She was also first cousin of the father of King Henri IV. Antoinette's parents had eight other children.

=== Marriage and children ===
At the court of Henry III and the Valois, the young Antoinette d'Orléans-Longueville stood out for her beauty, kindness and piety, which would become very important to her as she grew older. She was a maid of honor to Catherine de Medici, queen of France, who arranged her marriage at the age of 15 to a young marquis aged 18 of Italian origin, Charles de Gondi (son of Albert de Gondi). As the eldest child, Charles was the presumptive heir to the Duchy of Retz.

On 6 September 1587, Antoinette d'Orléans-Longueville married Charles de Gondi (1569–1596) at Mont-Saint-Michel. He was Marquis of Belle-Île, gentleman of the Chamber, General of the galleys of France and governor of Fougères. The couple had two sons: Henri de Gondi (1590 in Machecoul – 08/12/1659 in Chéméré), and Léonor de Gondi (died in 1600).

After the marriage, Antoinette left Paris to settle in Machecoul, a fief of the Duchy of Retz, an estate belonging at the time to the parents of Charles de Gondi, and where her two sons Henri and Léonor were born.

=== The Young Widow ===
In 1595, Charles de Gondi was entrusted with the government of Fougères and was promised that he would take charge of Mont-Saint-Michel, which was then governed by the Marquis de Quéroland. On 22 May 1596, Charles de Gondi attempted to enter Mont-Saint-Michel by surprise to take it, but the 27-year-old officer was killed during an altercation, "the circumstances of which remain mysterious."

Antoinette d'Orléans-Longueville, a grieving widow of 24, had her husband's body repatriated to Machecoul and organized a funeral worthy of his rank. While the ceremonies took place in Nantes, the young man's body was buried temporarily in Machecoul, in the Gondi family vault. Soon, Antoinette d'Orléans-Longueville decided to found a monastery in Machecoul where the body was buried again, so "prayers would be held more specifically for the repose of her husband's soul, which would be laid there."

=== Sister Antoinette of Saint Scholastica ===
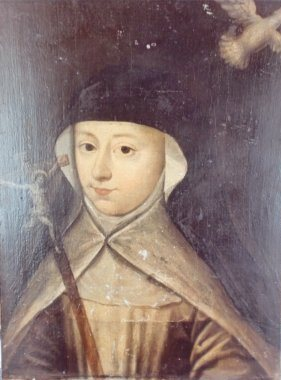
Portrait of Antoinette d'Orléans-Longueville as Sister Antoinette of Saint Scholastica.

Antoinette d'Orléans-Longueville spent another three years in Machecoul to defend the interests of her sons, Henri (now the direct heir to the Duchy of Retz ) and Léonor (who died soon thereafter in 1600), and left their education to governesses, tutors and their grandparents. Then, in 1599, she decided to "rebuild her life" at age 27. She learned of the existence of a new monastery, "a refuge for noble widows and orphans of war, run by the reformed Cistercian monks" and joined the Feuillantines convent near Toulouse as Sister Antoinette of Saint Scholastica.

Her noble birth suggested to authorities that she was a potential abbess, but instead, she wanted to "forget her birth and all greatness." But soon she was ordered by Pope Clement VIII to move from the Feuillantines convent to the Abbey of Notre-Dame de Fontevraud, where she refused to be abbess despite pressure to do so. After difficult assignments in several convents, she founded a religious order in Poitiers in 1617 called the Congregation of the Benedictines of Notre-Dame of Calvary. There, she helped establish seven convents, including the Daughters of Calvary in Paris.

=== Death ===
Antoinette d'Orléans-Longueville died from a form of lead poisoning at age 46 on 24 April 1618 in Poitiers.
