= Gondi family =

Italian noble family

Coat of Arms of the Gondi family

The Gondi family was a prominent Florentine banking family, financial partners of the Medici family. Unlike the Medici, they were of an ancient Florentine nobility, tracing their line traditionally from the legendary Philippi, said to have been ennobled by Charlemagne himself, in 805; from him the Strozzi and the Gualfreducci also claimed their descent. With Orlando Bellicozzo, a member of the Great Council of Florence in 1197, the Gondi emerge into history, receiving their patronymic from Gondo Gondi, sitting on the Great Council in 1251, signatory to a treaty between Florence and Genoa in that year. In the fourteenth century several members of the family sat on the Great Council. Simon de Gondi renounced the Ghibelline party for himself and his house, in 1351; he loaned the Republic 8000 golden florins in a time of extremity. He held extensive lands round Valcava, in the Mugello, where the church bore the Gondi arms inside and out. Of Simon's seven children, his grandson another Simon was the first of the Gondi to hold the position of Grand Prior of the Republic, on three occasions. His daughter Maddalena, who married Giovanni Salviati, by the marriage of her daughter Maria with Giovanni dalle Bande Nere, became the grandmother of Cosimo I de' Medici; thence were descended all the Catholic crowned heads of pre-Napoleonic Europe. Carlo de Gondi was a staunch backer of Piero de' Medici, and when the Medici came to be Grand Dukes, the Gondi received empty but honorary titles of Senators.

The Palazzo Gondi in Piazza San Firenze, Florence, the central seat of the family, was built from 1489 to 1495 to designs of Giuliano da Sangallo for Giuliano Gondi; it later passed to the Orlandini. The cortile is enclosed by colonnaded loggias; the staircase is remarkable for its fine balustrade infilled with animals and foliage. At the head of the interior staircase, leading to the principal apartments, is the statue of the Roman senator, taken from the supposed Temple of Isis. The chimneypiece of the salone is assumed to be the work of Giuliano da San Gallo.

Giuliano, who built the palazzo, had refused a pension offered him by the King of Naples, because he did not consider that the citizen of a free republic could accept money from a foreign prince with honour. His son completed the structure and commissioned the Gondi chapel in Santa Maria Novella. His descendants, nevertheless, were frequently in the pay of France, and were created French generals, admirals, governors of provinces, and even archbishops and Jean François Paul de Gondi, cardinal de Retz. Giovanni Battista Gondi was the Florentine resident in Paris in the 1620s.

== The French Gondi ==
Coat of Arms of the Gondi family, Duke of Retz

The founder of the French Gondi was Alberto (Albert), who settled in Lyon about 1505 as a member of an established Florentine community or nation, of merchants and bankers. In 1516 he married Marie-Catherine de Pierrevive (Pietraviva), daughter of a tax-farmer of a long-established Lyonnais family of Piedmontese origin; she caught the attention of Catherine de' Medici, whom she served as Governess to the Children of France. In turn the young Gondis, Pietro, Carlo, and above all Alberto (Albert de Gondi), a marshal of France and created duc de Retz, were repeatedly employed in state business by Catherine and by her sons, Charles IX of France and Henri III, as well as by the Bourbon king Henri IV.

During the 1570s, the Queen offered Jérôme de Gondi a dwelling at Saint-Cloud, the Hôtel d'Aulnay, which became the nucleus of the Château de Saint-Cloud. Henri III installed himself in this house in order to conduct the siege of Paris during the Wars of Religion, and here he was assassinated by the monk Jacques Clément. After the death of Jérôme de Gondi in 1604, the château was sold in 1618 by his son Jean-Baptiste II de Gondi to Jean de Bueil, comte de Sancerre, who died shortly afterwards. The château was bought back by Jean-François de Gondi, archbishop of Paris. His embellishments notably included gardens by Thomas Francine.

After the death of Jean-François de Gondi in 1654, the château was inherited in turn by Philippe-Emmanuel de Gondi and then his nephew Henri de Gondi, duc de Retz. The duc de Retz sold the property in 1655.

The Hôtel de Gondi, Paris, became in the seventeenth century the Hôtel de Condé.

As a consequence of their prominence, the Gondi archives are of outstanding importance to the historian of economics; they were described by Roberto Ridolfi, Gli archivi delle famiglie fiorentine (Florence: Olschki) 1943. Bound volumes of sixteenth- and seventeenth-century archives are at the University of Pennsylvania. In December 2000, thieves ransacked the archive, stealing many documents.

== Wine holdings ==
In the mid-19th century members of the Gondi family owned a stake in the notable Châteauneuf-du-Pape wine estate Château Fortia.
