= Governess of the Children of France =

Royal governess in the Kingdom of France

The governess of the children of France (French: gouvernante des Enfants de France; sometimes the governess of the royal children, gouvernante des enfants royaux) was an office in the French royal court in pre-Revolutionary France and during the Bourbon Restoration. As the head of the royal nursery, she was charged with the education of the children and grandchildren of the monarch. The holder of the office was taken from the highest-ranking nobility of France and was passed between female family members for much of its history by right of succession (survivance). The governess was supported by various deputies or under-governesses (sous gouvernantes) and oversaw a household consisting of dozens of servants and caregivers.

The Livre qui contient tout ce qui peut interesser Madame la Gouvernante des Enfans de France et surintandante de Leurs Maisons (1704-44) is the primary written source on the office of the royal governess during the Bourbon dynasty. It is housed and digitized by the Bibliothèque nationale de France. The official court document serves as a manual for the governess and her deputies. It includes the etiquette, ceremonial procedures and daily responsibilities of the role in great detail. It also consists of household inventories of the royal nursery.

== Governesses of the Children of France ==
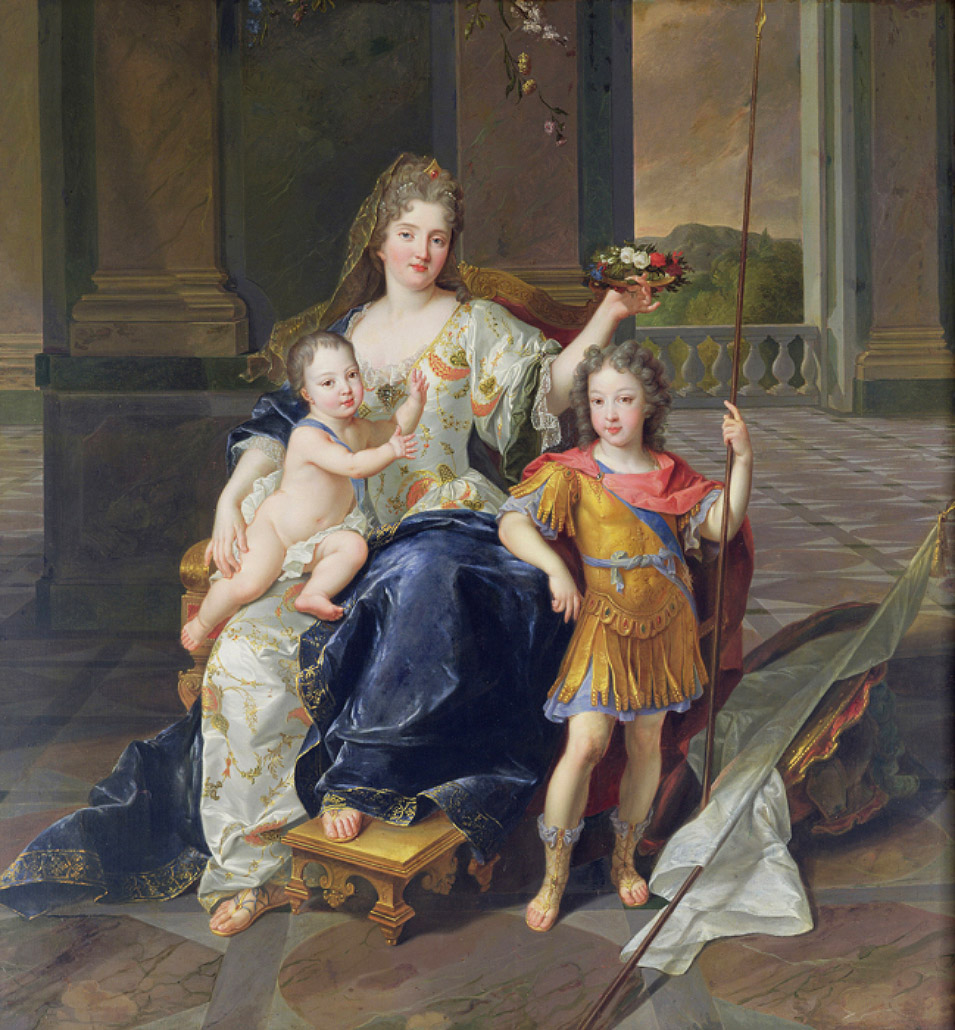
The Duchess of La Ferté-Senneterre with the Duke of Anjou on her lap and the Duke of Brittany, François de Troy

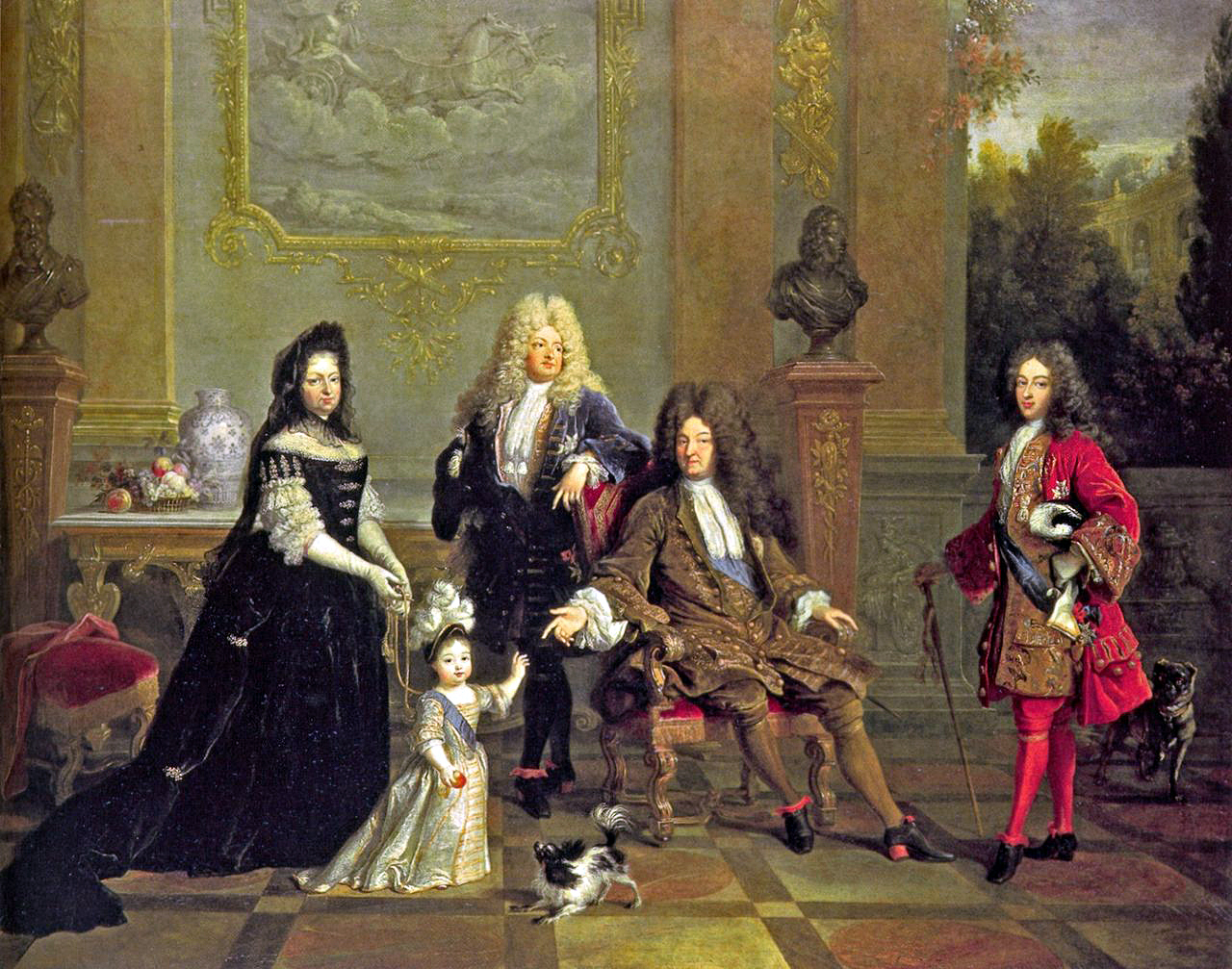
The Duchess of Ventadour with Louis XIV, his young great-grandson (the future Louis XV), Louis the Grand Dauphin, and Louis, Duke of Burgundy

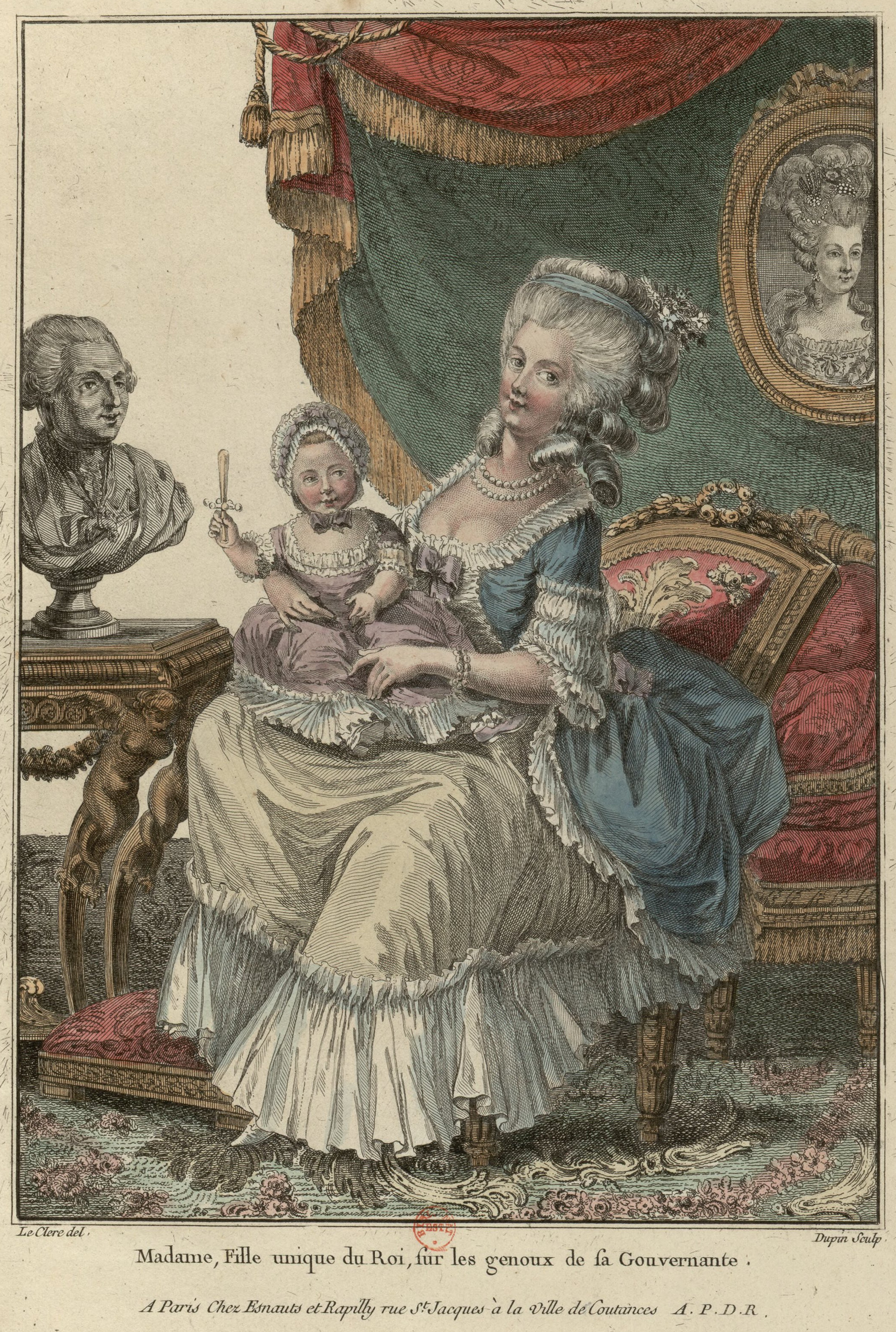
Engraving of Victoire de Rohan with Madame Royale overlooked by a painting of Marie Antoinette, unknown artist

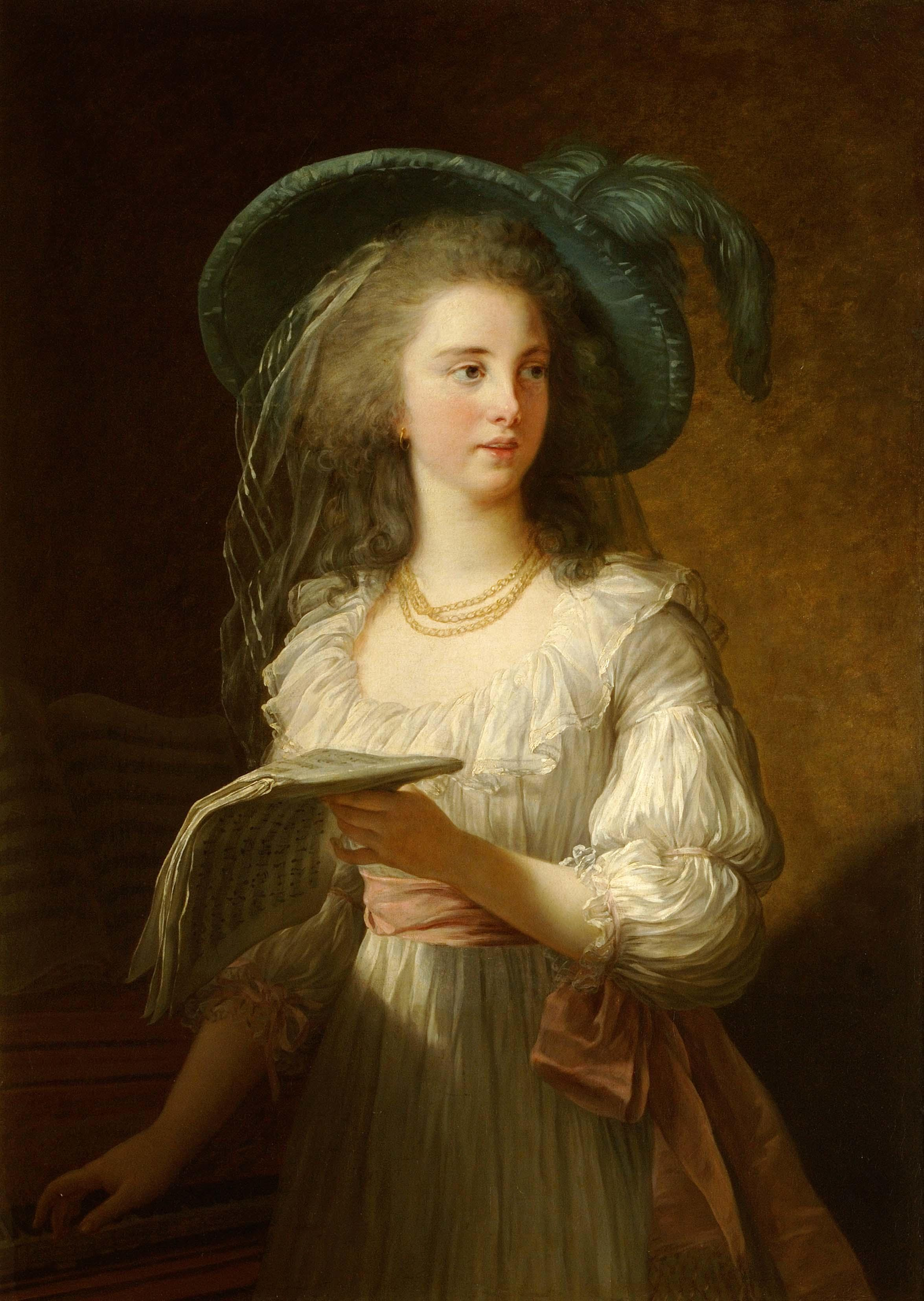
Yolande de Polastron, by Madame Vigée Le Brun

=== Children of Charles VIII ===
- Madame de Boufflers, appointed for Charles-Orland in 1492

=== Children of Louis XII ===
- Madame de Bouchage, appointed 1499
- Dame de Tournon, governess of Claude
- Michelle de Saubonne

=== Children of Francis I ===
- Charlotte Gouffier de Boisy, Madame de Cossé-Brissac
- Guillemette de Sarrebruck, comtesse de Braine

=== Children of Henry II ===
- 1544–1557: Françoise de Contay (d. 1557), Madame d'Humières, Dame de Contay.
  - Marie-Catherine Gondi, 'Madame Duperon' (d. 1570), sous gouvernante (deputy)
  - Charlotte de Curton (d. 1575), sous gouvernante (deputy)
- Louise de Clermont (1504–1596), comtesse de Tonnerre and duchesse d’Uzès.
- Claude Catherine de Clermont (1543–1603), Duchess of Retz.

=== Children of Charles IX ===
- 1572–1578: Isabelle de Crissé.

=== Children of Henry IV ===
- 1601–1625: Françoise de Longuejoue, baronne de Montglat (d. 1633)

=== Children of Louis XIII ===
- 1638–1643: Françoise de Lansac (1583–1657)
- 1643–1646: Marie-Catherine de Senecey (1588–1677)

=== Children of Louis XIV ===
- 1661–1664: Julie d'Angennes, (1607–1671) duchesse de Montausier
- 1661–1672: Louise de Prie, (1624–1709), Marquise of Toucy, Duchess of Cardona

==== Children of Louis, Grand Dauphin ====
- 1682–1691: Louise de Prie, (1624–1709), Marquise of Toucy, Duchess of Cardona

==== Children of Louis, Duke of Burgundy ====
- 1704–1709: Louise de Prie (1624–1709), Marquise of Toucy, Duchess of Cardona
- 1709–1710: Marie Isabelle Angélique de La Mothe-Houdancourt (1654–1726), Duchess of La Ferté-Senneterre
- 1710–1735: Charlotte de La Mothe-Houdancourt, (1651–1744), Duchess of Ventadour
  - Anne Julie de Melun acted as a sous gouvernante to Madame de Ventadour
  - 1704–1717: Madame de La Lande
  - 1710–1717: Marie-Suzanne de Valicourt

=== Children of Louis XV ===
- 1727–1735: Charlotte de La Mothe-Houdancourt, (1654–1744), Duchess of Ventadour.
- 1735–1754: Marie Isabelle de Rohan, (1699–1754), Duchess of Tallard
  - 1727–1746: Madame de La Lande, sous gouvernante (deputy)
  - 1727–1744: Marie-Suzanne de Valicourt, sous gouvernante (deputy)
  - 1729–?: Marguerite d'Armand de Mizon, sous gouvernante (deputy)

==== Children of Louis, Dauphin of France ====
- 1735–1754: Marie Isabelle de Rohan, (1699–1754), Duchess of Tallard
- 1754–1776: Marie Louise de Rohan, (1720–1803), Countess of Marsan
  - 1771–1778: Marie Angélique de Mackau, sous gouvernante (deputy)

=== Children of Louis XVI ===
- 1776–1782: Victoire de Rohan, (1743–1807), Princess of Guéméné
- 1782–1789: Yolande de Polastron, (1749–1793), Duchess of Polignac.
- 1789–1792: Louise Élisabeth de Croÿ, (1749–1832), Marquise of Tourzel.
  - 1776–1792: Marie Angélique de Mackau, sous gouvernante (deputy)
  - 1781–1792: Renée Suzanne de Soucy, sous gouvernante (deputy)
  - 1785–1792: Agathe de Rambaud

=== Children of Charles Ferdinand, Duke of Berry ===
- 1819–1830: Marie Joséphine Louise, duchesse de Gontaut (1773–1857)

== See also ==
- Aya de los Infantes
