= Dampierre-sur-Boutonne =

- Commune
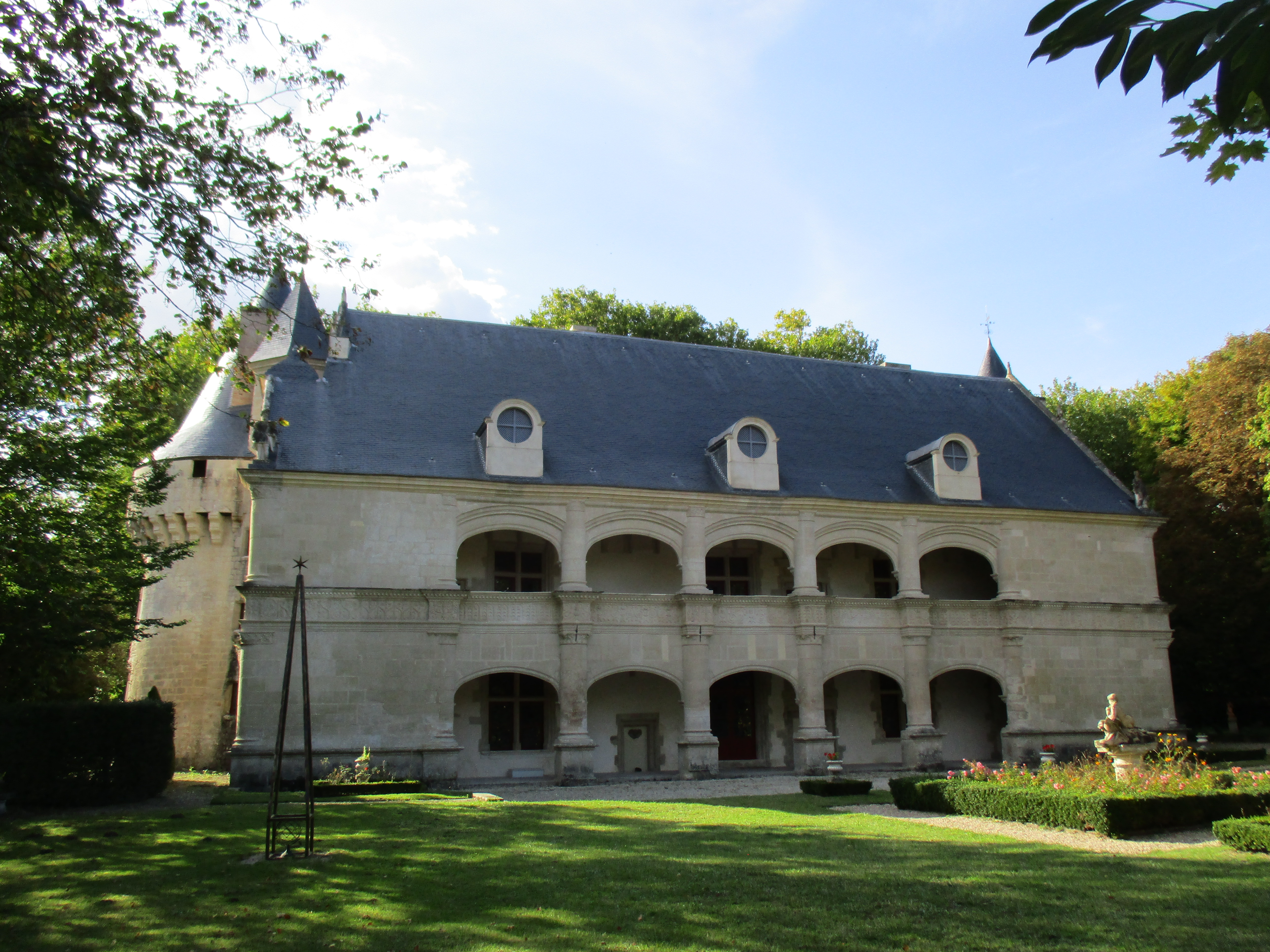
- The chateau in Dampierre-sur-Boutonne
- Location of Dampierre-sur-Boutonne
- Location within France Location within Nouvelle-Aquitaine
- Coordinates: 46°04′02″N 0°24′51″W
- Country: France
- Region: Nouvelle-Aquitaine
- Department: Charente-Maritime
- Arrondissement: Saint-Jean-d'Angély
- Canton: Matha
- Intercommunality: Vals de Saintonge

Government
  - Mayor (2020–2026): Jean-Michel Gautier
- Area^{1}: 14.04 km^{2} (5.42 sq mi)
- Highest elevation: 83 m (272 ft)
- Lowest elevation: 31 m (102 ft)
- Population (2023): 267
  - Density: 19.0/km^{2} (49.3/sq mi)
- Time zone: UTC+01:00 (CET)
  - Summer (DST): UTC+02:00 (CEST)
- INSEE/Postal code: 17138 /17470
- ^{1} French Land Register data, which excludes lakes, ponds, glaciers > 1 km^{2} (0.386 sq mi or 247 acres) and river estuaries.

Dampierre-sur-Boutonne (French pronunciation: [dɑ̃pjɛʁ syʁ butɔn], literally Dampierre on Boutonne) is a commune in the Charente-Maritime department in southwestern France.

== Geography ==
The village lies in the southwestern part of the commune, on the left bank of the Boutonne, which forms most of the commune's western border.

== Population ==
Historical population
Year	Pop.	±% p.a.
1968	416	—
1975	385	−1.10%
1982	348	−1.43%
1990	335	−0.47%
1999	297	−1.33%
2007	299	+0.08%
2012	275	−1.66%
2017	282	+0.50%
2023	267	−0.91%
Source: INSEE

== See also ==
- Communes of the Charente-Maritime department
