= Buzay Abbey =

Former Cistercian monastery in Rouans, Pays de la Loire, formerly in Brittany

- Abbaye de Buzay
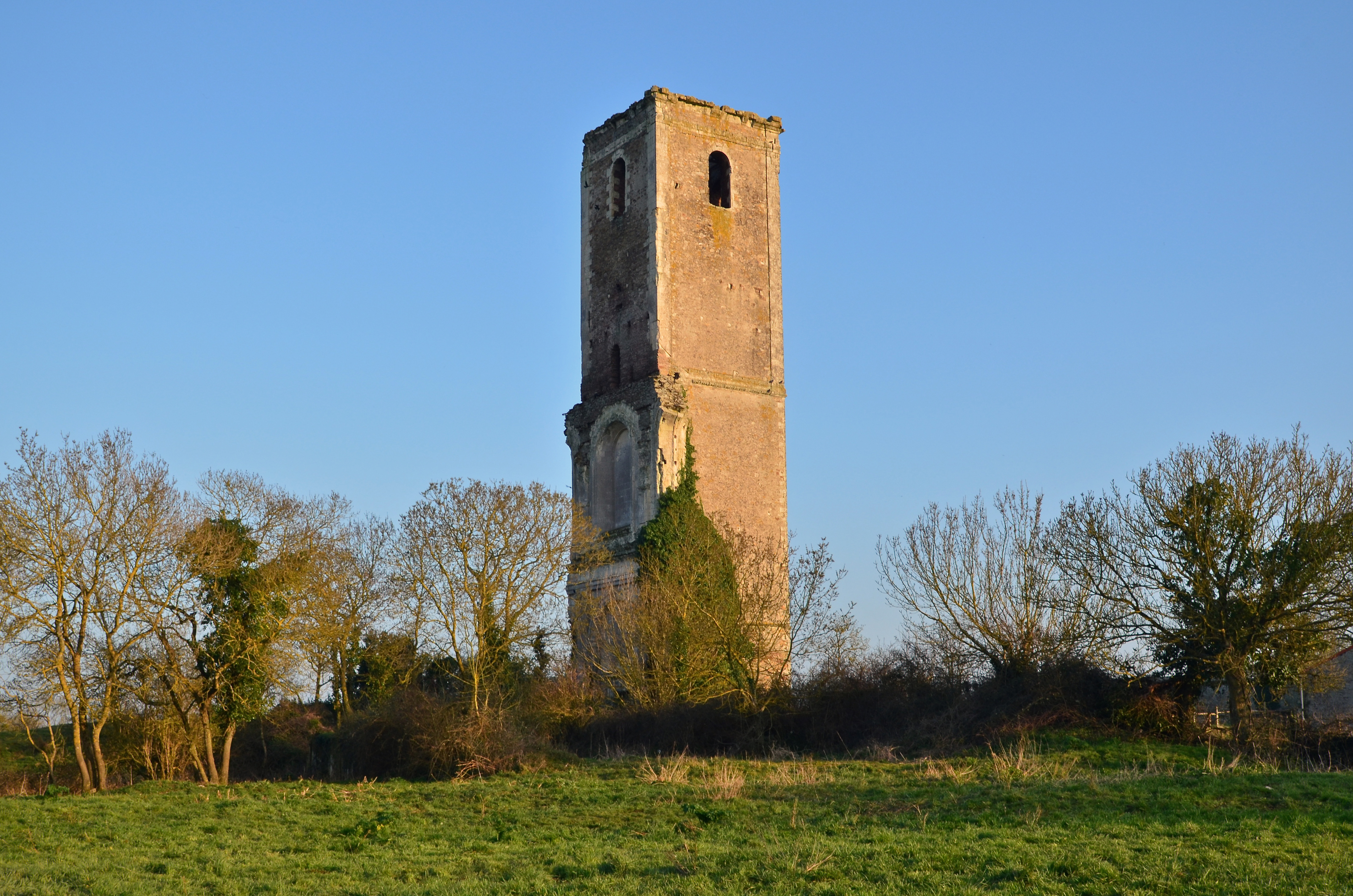
- The surviving tower of the abbey

- Location within Pays de la Loire Location within France
- Interactive map of Buzay Abbey

Monastery information
- Other name: Buzai
- Order: Cistercian
- Established: 1134
- Mother house: Clairvaux Abbey
- Diocese: Nantes

People
- Founder: Bernard of Clairvaux
- Abbot: See list

Site
- Location: Rouans, Pays de la Loire, France
- Coordinates: 47°12′25″N 1°49′32″W

Buzay Abbey, dedicated to Our Lady, was a Cistercian Abbey at Rouans in Pays de la Loire, France, formerly in Brittany, founded in 1135 and dissolved in 1790.

== History ==
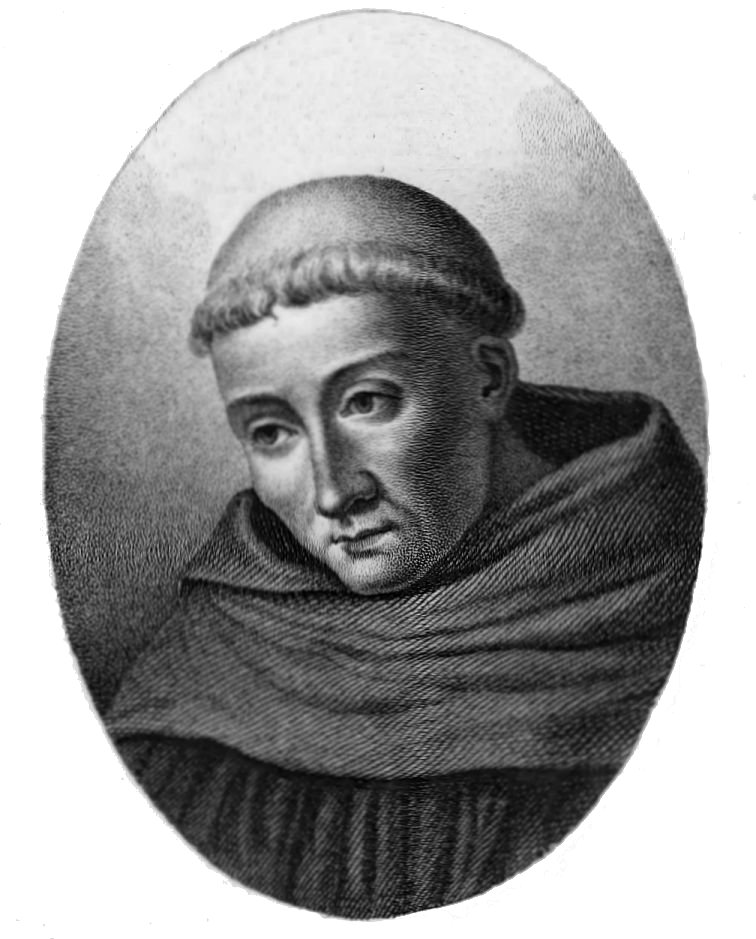
Bernard of Clairvaux, founder

Bernard of Clairvaux founded the abbey at Buzay in 1135, at the request of Ermengarde of Anjou, widow of Alan IV, Duke of Brittany, and mother of Conan III, Duke of Brittany. The next year, in 1136, the first community of a dozen monks settled on the site of the new abbey with Nivard, a younger brother of Bernard de Clairvaux, as their prior. Bernard himself came for the dedication of the new foundation, accompanied by Geoffroy de Lèves, Bishop of Chartres, as they were travelling together on a visit to Parthenay to meet William X, Duke of Aquitaine. Around 1143, Bernard of Clairvaux came from Champagne to visit Buzay, but found its abbey in a state of great poverty and neglect. Conan III had not honoured his promises of support, and Bernard asked the monks to return to Clairvaux, but first he met Conan III, who admitted his fault and gave the monks everything he had denied them. They then decided to stay.

The abbey became rich, thanks to the salt trade, commercial traffic on the river Loire, and many gifts of land and other property. In 1177, Robert II, bishop of Nantes, approved the addition of a convent for nuns. In 1180, Geoffrey Plantagenet, Count of Nantes, a son of Henry II of England, Duke of Normandy, and of Eleanor of Aquitaine, assigned to the abbey in perpetuity twenty livres to be paid by the mills of the surrounding parish.

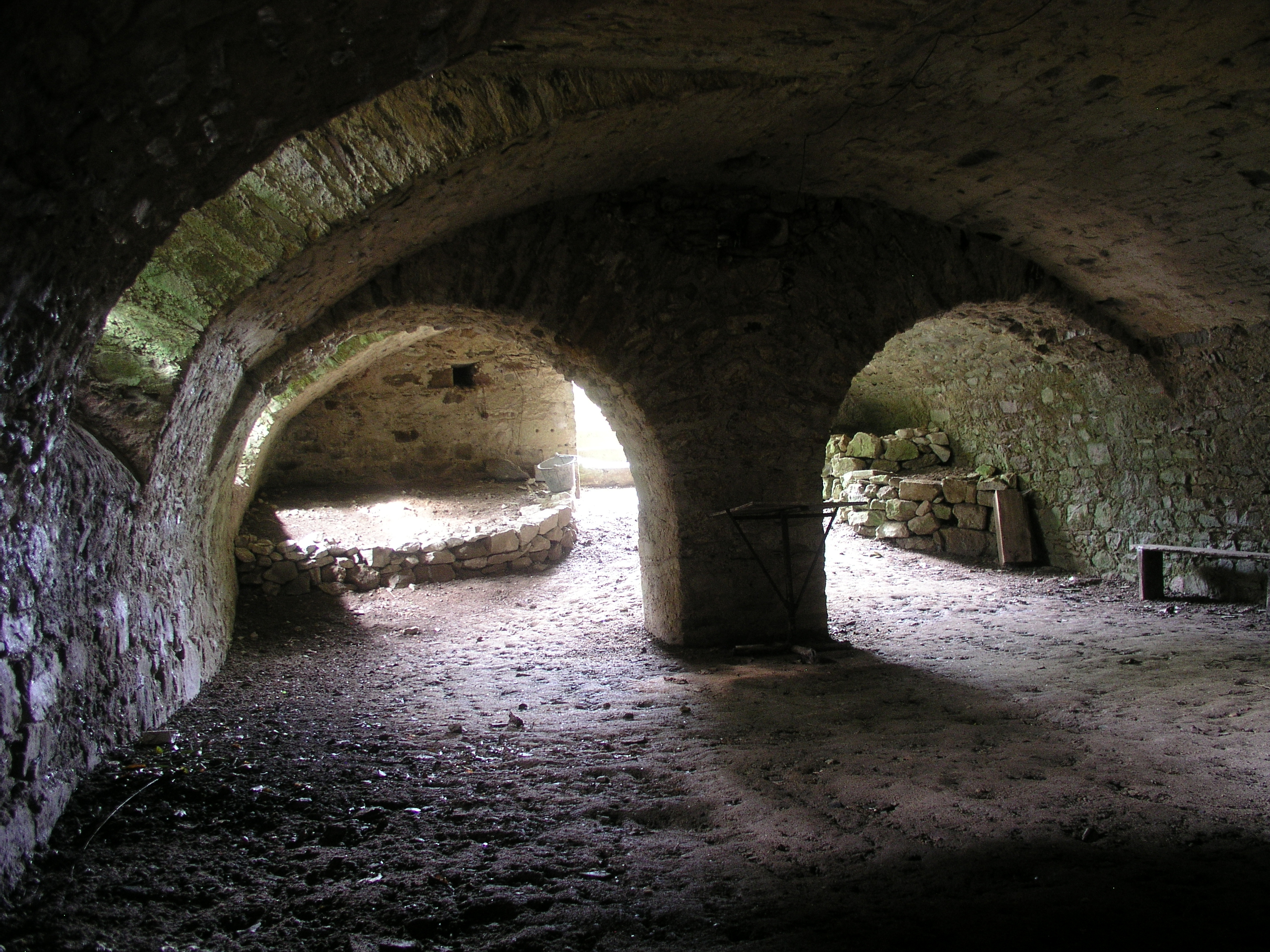
The abbey’s vaulted cellars survive

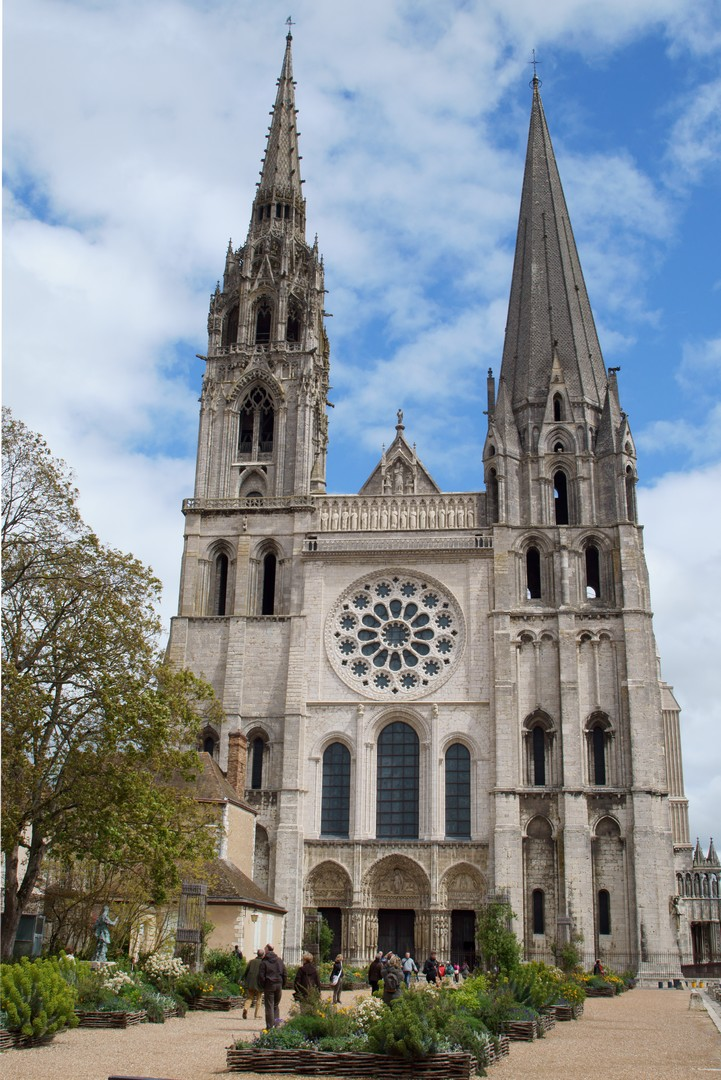
Chartres Cathedral

With effect from 1474, commendatory abbots were appointed by the duke or king, replacing the regular abbots elected locally.

During the War in the Vendée (March – December 1793), following the French Revolution, Buzay Abbey was destroyed by fire. What now remains of the buildings is a tower which had been rebuilt in the 18th century, and some vaulted cellars. Other survivals are the bells, which were transferred to Chartres Cathedral, an Italian marble altar, which was moved to the church of Saint-Louis in Paimbœuf, a pulpit, now in the church of St Peter in Bouguenais, and some other objects, including the oldest crucifix in the Pays de Retz, dating from the fourteenth century, in the chapel of St Anne of Tharon at Saint-Michel-Chef-Chef.

== Daughter houses ==
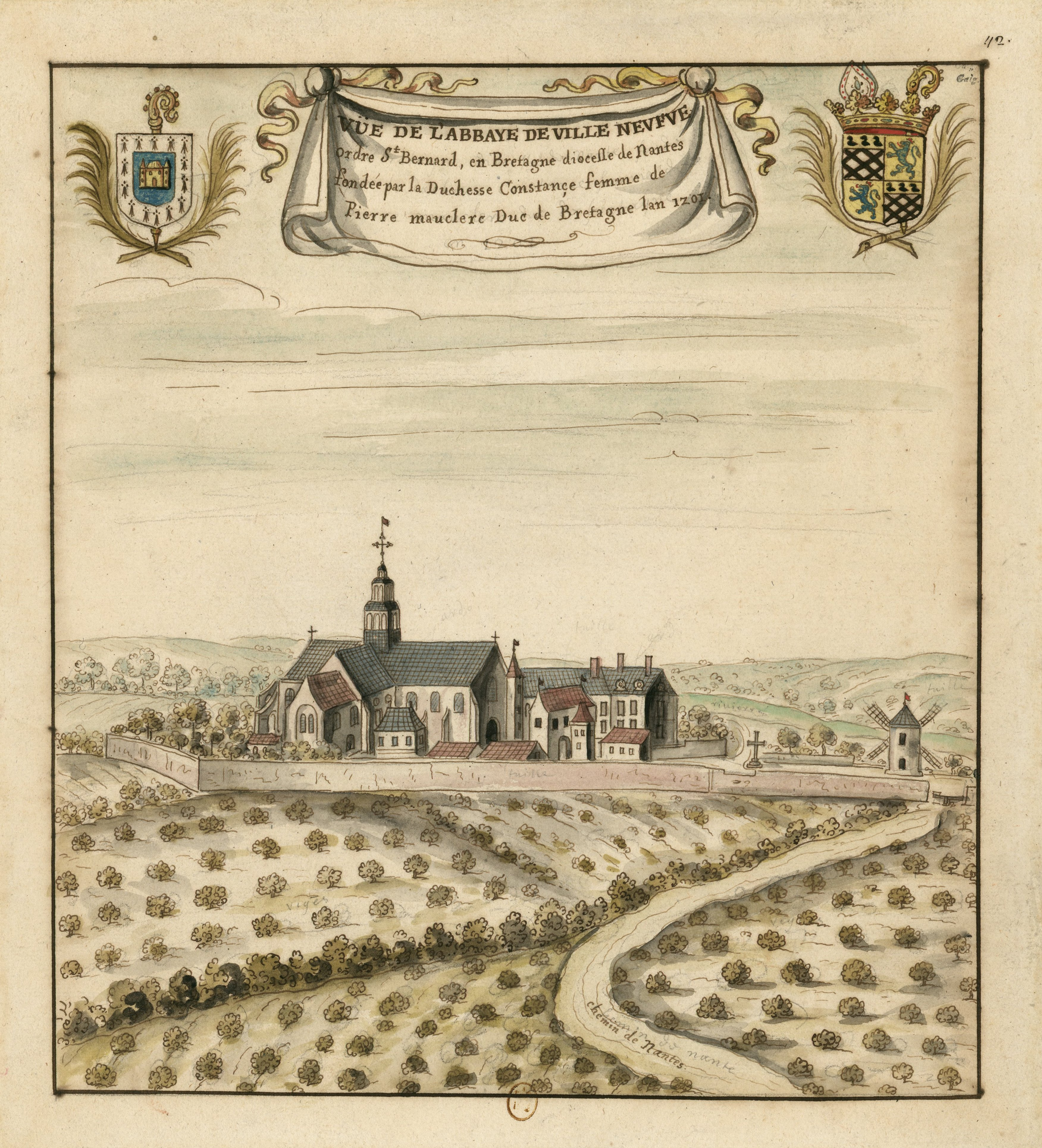
Villeneuve Abbey, in an engraving of 1695

From Buzay, three new Cistercian abbeys were instituted as daughter houses.

On 1 July 1172, Buzay sent a few monks to the small Île du Pilier, north of Noirmoutier. However, the small windswept island posed so many problems for the new community that in 1205 the monks fell back on the island of Noirmoutier and founded the abbey of Our Lady the White.

On 25 March 1200, at the request of Constance, Duchess of Brittany, monks were sent for the founding of her new Villeneuve Abbey, on land belonging to Buzay, located on the Ognon, a river flowing into the lake of Grand-Lieu, near the Châtellenie of Touffou and the village of Bignon. The monks would help to drain the surrounding marshes, with advice from engineers of the Poitevin marshes, and would also help to dig a canal between Messan and the Loire.

In 1259, Buzay was prosperous enough to establish Prières Abbey, at the request of John I, Duke of Brittany, and the Cistercian Order.

== List of Abbots ==
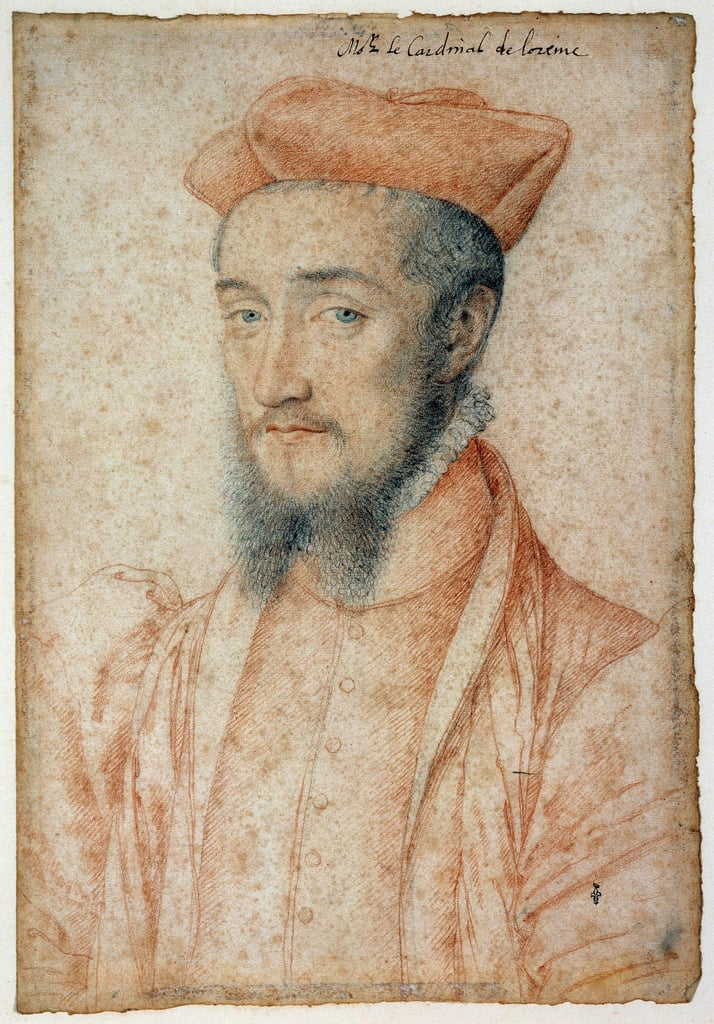
Charles de Lorraine, abbot 1552–1564

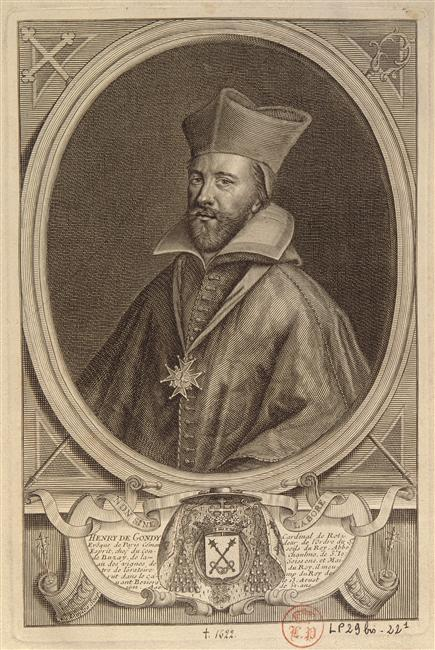
Henri de Gondi, abbot 1598–1622

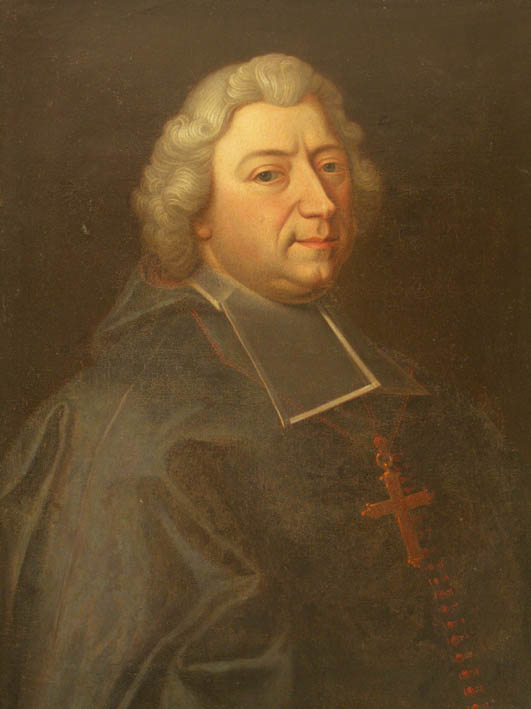
François Lefebvre de Caumartin, abbot 1675–1733

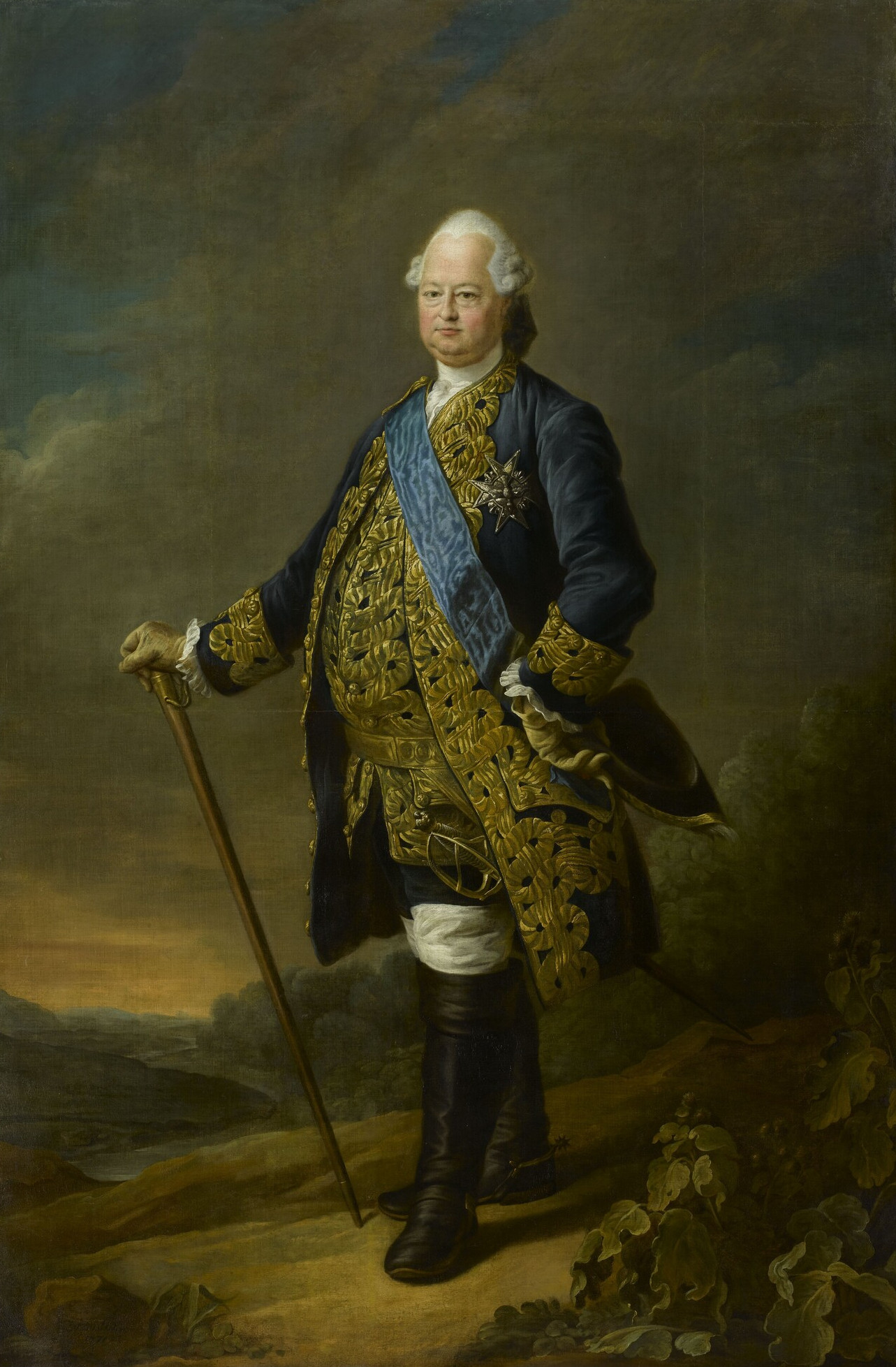
Louis de Bourbon-Condé, abbot 1733–1737

=== Regular ===
- 1144 : Pierre I
- 1150–1153 : Guillaume I
- 1155 : Adam
- 1170 : Pierre II
- 1175 : Geoffroi
- 1177 : Richard
- 1187 : Menno
- 1199 : Guillaume II Robert
- 1203 : Gaultier
- 1206 : Égide I
- 1206 : Raoul
- 1232 : Richard II
- 1236 : Mathieu
- 1237 : Barthélemy
- 1244 : Égide II
- 1268 : Robert
- 1270 : Samson
- 1276 : Daniel
- 1310 : Henri I
- 1317 : Jean I
- 1325 : Jean II de Mez
- 1359 : Henri II
- 1377 : Louis
- 1384 : Guillaume III Maréchal
- 1417 : Jean III Gendron
- 1453 : Pierre Villageys
- 1454–1471 : Humbert Boulay

=== Commendatory ===
- 1474–1492 : Odet de la Rivière
- 1492 : Pierre III Gigan
- 1494–1512 : Jean IV Bohier
- 1519 : Jean V
- 1524–1543 : Louis Tissart
- 1552 : Charles, Cardinal of Lorraine
- 1564 : Henri III Clausse
- 1576 : Pierre IV de Gondi
- 1598–1622 : Henri IV Cardinal de Gondi
- 1622–1654 : Jean VI François de Gondi
- 1654–1675 : Jean François Paul de Gondi, Cardinal de Retz
- 1675–1733 : Jean VII François Paul Lefebvre de Caumartin
- 1733–1737 : Louis de Bourbon-Condé, Count of Clermont
- 1737 : Pierre V Augustin Bernardin de Rosset de Fleury
- 1789–1790 : Jean Georges Lefranc de Pompignan
