= Villeneuve Abbey =

Former Cistercian monastery in Les Sorinières, Pays de la Loire, Brittany

- Abbaye de Villeneuve
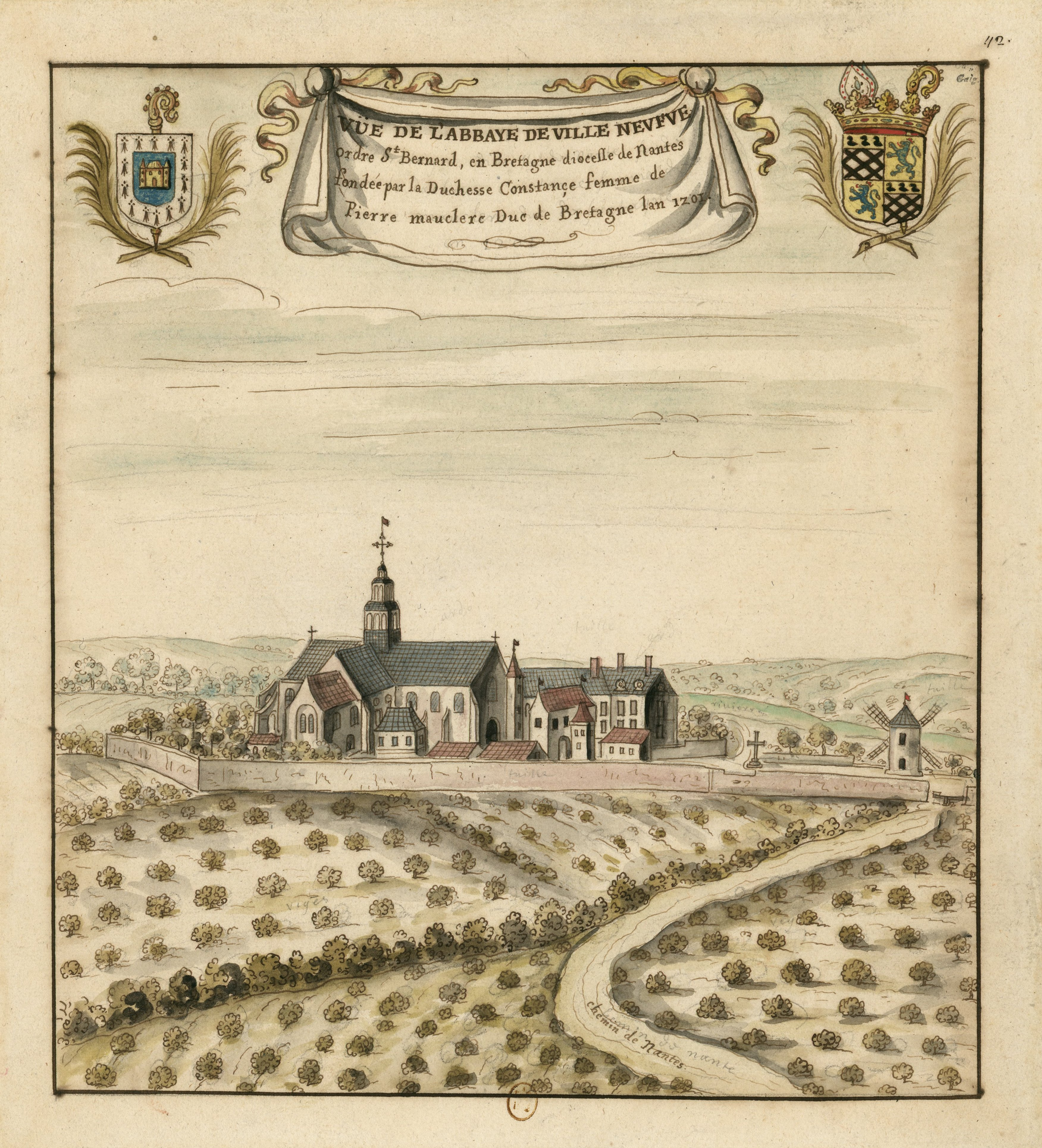
- Villeneuve Abbey, engraving of 1695

- Location within France Location within Pays de la Loire Location within Loire-Atlantique
- Interactive map of Villeneuve Abbey

Monastery information
- Order: Cistercian
- Established: 1200
- Mother house: Buzay Abbey
- Diocese: Nantes

People
- Founder: Constance, Duchess of Brittany
- Abbot: See list

Site
- Location: Le Bignon, Pays de la Loire, France
- Coordinates: 47°07′24″N 01°32′02″W

Villeneuve Abbey, dedicated to Our Lady, was a Cistercian monastery at the present-day Les Sorinières, near Nantes in Pays de la Loire (formerly in Brittany), France, founded in 1201 and dissolved in 1790, during the French Revolution.

For many years after its foundation, the abbey was the principal burial place of the founder's family. The main surviving building, also known as the Château de Villeneuve, is now a hotel.

== Early history ==
Coat of arms of Villeneuve Abbey

On the death of Conan IV, Duke of Brittany, his daughter Constance became ruler of Brittany and Countess of Richmond, at a time when both were parts of the Angevin Empire. She married firstly Geoffrey, a younger son of Henry II of England and Eleanor of Aquitaine, who thus became Duke of Brittany, and secondly after Geoffrey's death Ranulf, Earl of Chester. In 1196, Constance was kidnapped by her estranged husband, but in 1199 she escaped, and the marriage was dissolved on the grounds of desertion. Thirdly, about November 1199, she married Guy of Thouars, and their daughter Alix was born in 1200.

On 25 March 1200, Constance brought monks from Buzay Abbey to establish a new Cistercian monastery to be called Villeneuve, on land belonging to Buzay, located on the Ognon, a river flowing into the lake of Grand-Lieu, near the village of le Bignon. However, the formal founding of the new abbey did not take place until 1201, when on 25 March Constance gave the new abbey a charter. Guillaume Robert, the Abbot of Buzay elected in 1199, was present at the foundation.

Constance died in September 1201, perhaps following the birth of another daughter, and her body was intombed later that month in the oratory of her new abbey, the church of which had not yet been built.

Like Prières, Villeneuve was a daughter house of Buzay, with Clairvaux as its primary abbey. The first abbot, Bertrand, was appointed in 1207.

The early activities of the monks of Villeneuve included helping to drain the surrounding marshes, with advice from engineers of the Poitevin Marshes, and also helping to dig a canal between Messan and the Loire.

The abbey's church was consecrated on 25 October 1223, when the bodies of Constance, her last husband Guy of Thouars (died 1213), and their daughter Alix (died 1221), were transferred into it, with Étienne de La Bruère, Bishop of Nantes, officiating, supported by Guillaume de Beaumont, Bishop of Angers, in the presence of several important noblemen, including Aimery VII of Thouars and Amaury of Craon, Viscount of Beaumont, Seneschal of Angers.

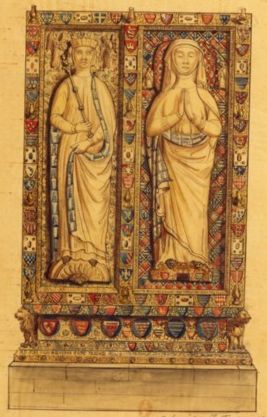
Tomb of Alix, Duchess of Brittany (1201–1221) and Yolande of Brittany (1218–1272)

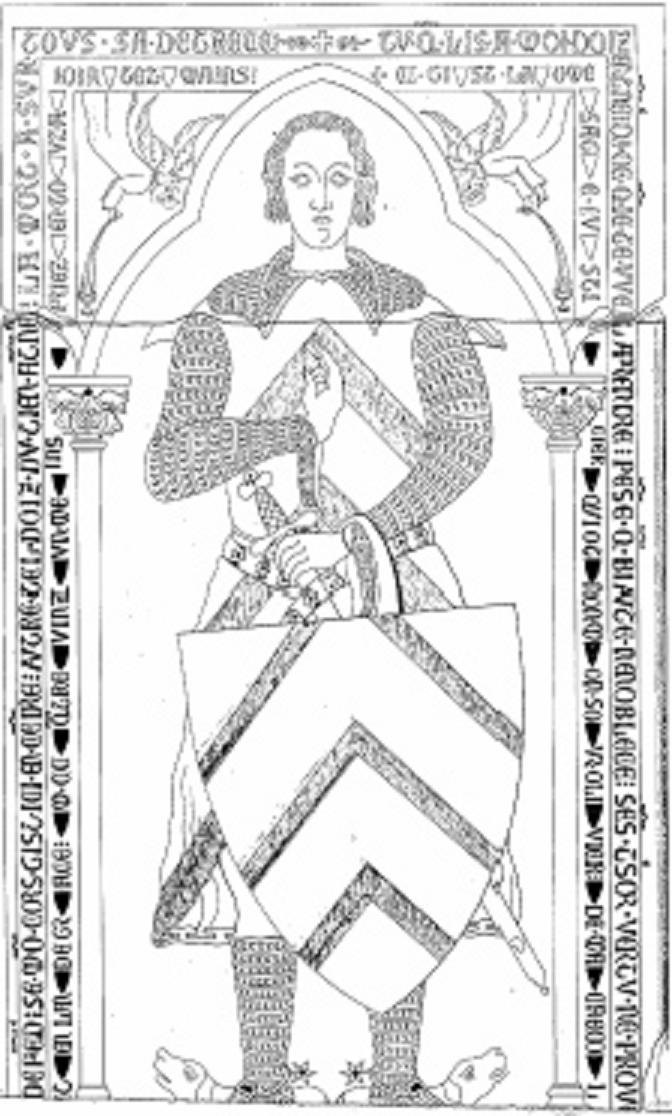
Tomb of Olivier I de Machecoul (1231–1279), engraving of 1859

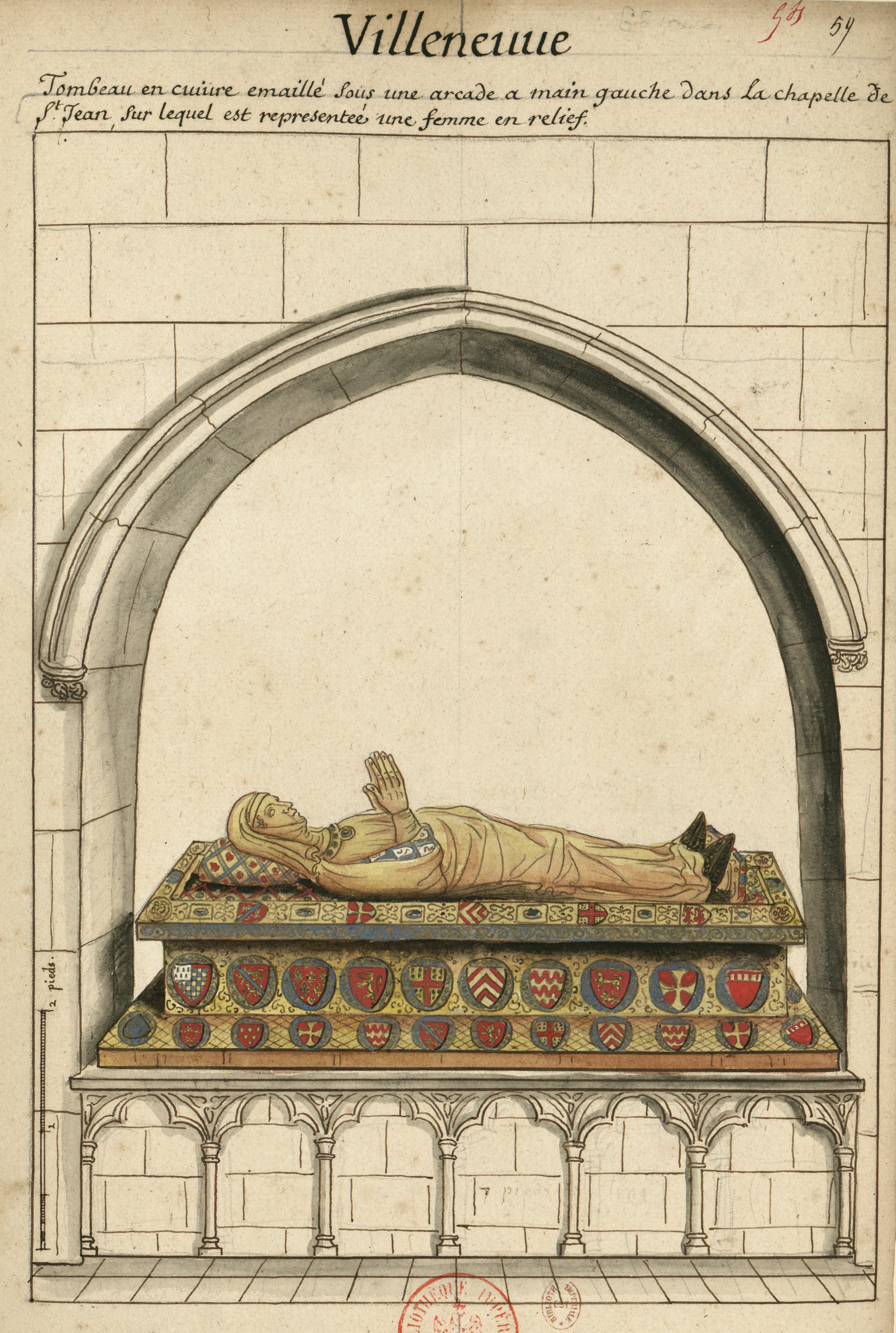
Tomb of a lady, engraving of 1695

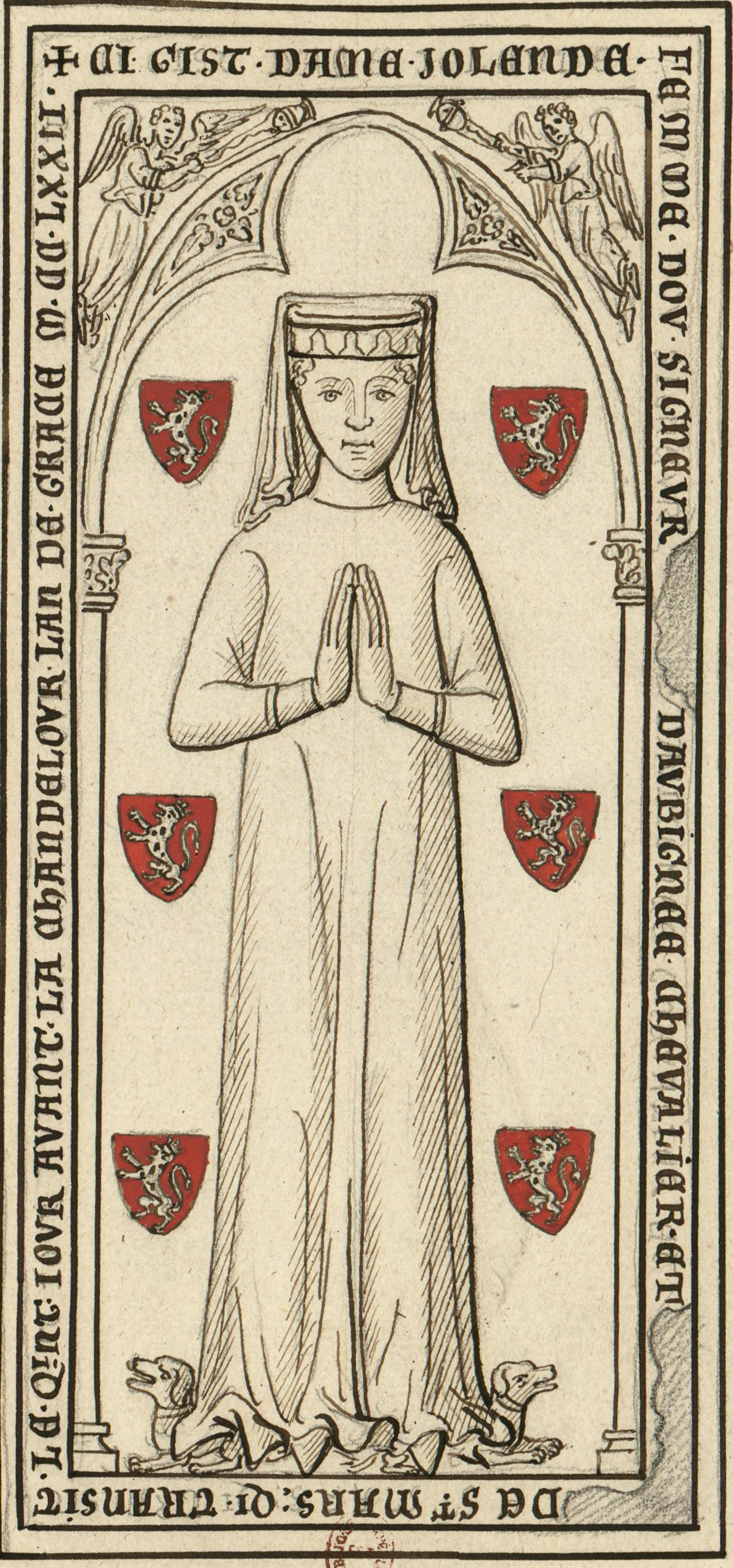
Tomb of Yolande of Aubigné, engraving of 1695

== Later history ==
Villeneuve remained an important monastery until the 15th century, but then began to decline.

In the second half of the 17th century, the resident abbots of Villeneuve were replaced by commendatory abbots, who were not always priests, appointed by the favour of the king. As with other monasteries, this hastened the decline. The new commendatory abbots received about half of the monastery's income, leaving less for the monks, who now had a lower status, and fewer remained. Jean d'Estrées, in office from 1677, was the first abbot of this new kind. In 1726, the Abbot of Villeneuve had an annual income of ten thousand livres, equivalent to 417 Louis d'or.

In 1789, during the French Revolution, with only eight monks remaining, Claude-François Lysarde de Radonvilliers, the last commendatory abbot, died, and the abbey was immediately nationalized and sold. The eight monks, who included a prior and a sub-prior, were all priests and all remained in the parish of le Bignon. The buyer of the abbey's agricultural land and buildings was a M. Blanchard, Clerk of the Presidial court of Nantes. The new owner was only interested in the abbey's land and its former hostelry, which he put into use as a house, and speedily demolished the Abbey church. However, Blanchard was soon disturbed by the War in the Vendée, when Villeneuve was turned into a stronghold of the Whites and was attacked by the Blues, its buildings burned out, and the trees surrounding the property cut down. Many tombs were profaned, and the human remains in them scattered.

Blanchard returned after the war and restored the hostelry, dating from the early 18th century, renaming it "château de Villeneuve". This is still the present main house, but is much altered since the time of the monks. Abandoned since the Second World War, it was restored in 1977 and is now a luxury hotel and restaurant. The Dalai Lama stayed here when visiting Nantes in August 2008.

== List of abbots ==
=== Regular ===
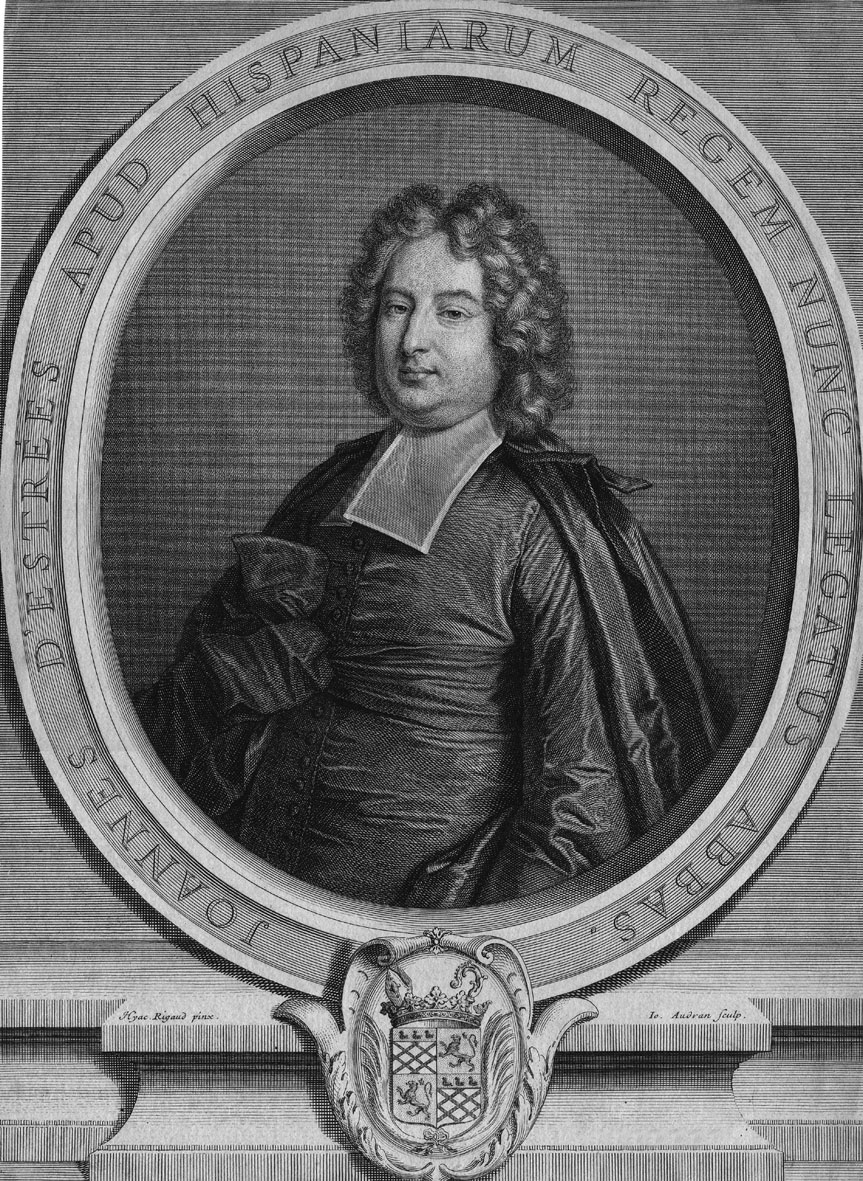
Jean d'Estrées, abbot 1677–1718

- 1207–1215: Bertrand I
- 1215–1225: Jean I
- 1225–unknown: Pierre I
- unknown–1250: Raoul
- 1250–1281: Thomas
- 1281–1294: Alain
- 1294–1328: Jean II of Caen, or of Kent
- 1328–unknown: Pierre II
- unknown–1348: Jean III Goué
- 1348–1366: Jean IV of Rézai
- 1366–1384: Alain Berrai or Louvenan
- 1384–1397: Jean V Raineau
- 1397–1407: Jean VI Durand
- 1407–1417: Jean VII Rondeau
- 1417–1424: Pierre III Maignen
- 1424–1441: Nicolas Brandai
- 1441–1456: Jean VIII de Carné
- 1456–1481: Jean IX d’Avaugour
- 1481–1509: Jean X de Loyon
- 1509–unknown: Yves I
- unknown–1540: Bertrand de Loyon
- 1540–1543: Yves II de Kerbevet
- 1543–1550: Philippe de la Chambre, cardinal, held letters of safeguard
- 1551–1558: François Le Petit
- 1558–1571: Martin Roger
- 1571–1591: Guillaume Paineau, translated from Abbot of Montdieu
- 1591–1614: Antoine Bouguier
- 1614–1623: Blaise Bouguier, nephew of Antoine
- 1623–1656: Bernard L’Argentier
- 1656–1677: Nicolas Paget

=== Commendatory ===
- 1677–1718: Jean d'Estrées
- 1719–1746: Nicolas-Hubert Mongault
- 1746–1770: N. Lefèbre de Laubrière
- 1770–1789: Claude-François Lysarde de Radonvilliers

== Notable burials ==
Apart from Constance, Duchess of Brittany (died 1201), her husband Guy of Thouars (died 1213), and their daughter Alix, others buried at the abbey include:

- Yolande of Brittany (1218–1272), daughter of Alix, Duchess of Brittany, and of Peter I, Duke of Brittany
- Nicole (died 1232), second wife (or mistress) of Peter I
- Olivier I de Machecoul (c. 1231–1279), son of Peter I and Nicole
- Amicie de Coché, marquise de Souché (1235–1268), a daughter of Olivier de Coché and Pétronille de Clisson, the first wife of Olivier I de Machecoul
- Louise de Machecoul (1276–1307), daughter of Olivier I
- Jean I de Machecoul (c. 1255–1308), son of Olivier I and Amicie de Coché.
