= Jean François Paul de Gondi =

French Catholic cardinal (1613–1679)

His Eminence Jean François Paul de Gondi
- Cardinal, Archbishop of Paris
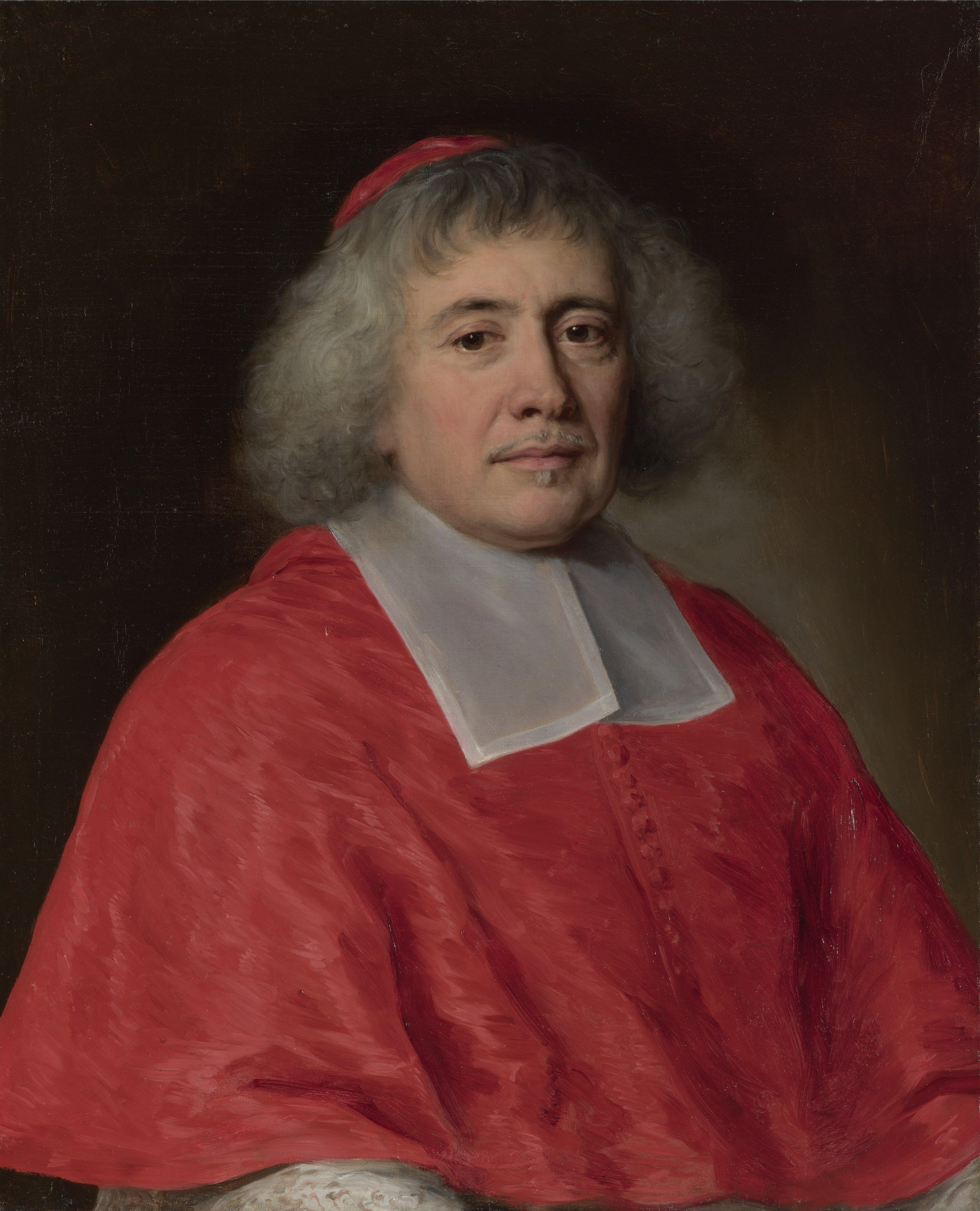
- Portrait by Jacob Ferdinand Voet
- Church: Catholic Church
- Archdiocese: Paris
- Installed: 21 May 1654
- Term ended: 15 February 1662
- Predecessor: Jean-François de Gondi
- Successor: Pierre de Marca
- Other posts: Abbot of Saint-Denis (1661–1679); Cardinal-Priest of Santa Maria Sopra Minerva (1655–1679)

Orders
- Ordination: November 1643
- Consecration: 31 January 1644 by Jean-François de Gondi
- Created cardinal: 19 February 1652 by Innocent X
- Rank: Cardinal-Priest

Personal details
- Born: 20 September 1613 Montmirail, France
- Died: 24 August 1679 (aged 65) Paris, France

Jean François Paul de Gondi, Cardinal de Retz (20 September 1613 – 24 August 1679) was a French churchman, writer of memoirs, and agitator in the Fronde.

The Florentine banking and noble Gondi family had been introduced into France by Catherine de' Medici; Catherine offered Jérome (Girolamo) de Gondi in 1573 the château that he made the nucleus of the Château de Saint-Cloud; his hôtel in the Faubourg Saint-Germain of Paris became the Hôtel de Condé in the following generation. The Gondi acquired great estates in Brittany and became connected with the noblest houses of the kingdom.

== Early life ==
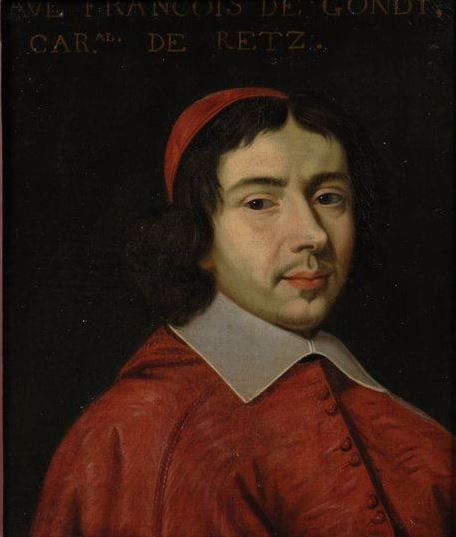
Jean-François Paul de Gondi as a young cardinal of the church.

Jean-François de Gondi was born in Montmirail, in the Brie region of northern France. He was the third son in his family, and according to Tallemant des Réaux was made a knight of Malta on the very day of his birth. The death of his second brother, however, destined him for a closer connection with the Church. The Retz side of his family had much church influence, and though young Jean-François was not much attracted to the clergy, his family insisted that he join it. They said he lacked the appearance of a soldier, being short, near-sighted, ugly and awkward.

He was tutored by St. Vincent de Paul and educated at the Sorbonne. When he was eighteen, he wrote Conjuration de Fiesque, a little historical essay, influenced by the Italian of Agostino Mascardi, and audaciously insinuating revolutionary principles.

== Family background ==
The district of Retz or Rais is in southern Brittany, and has been under the control of several different families. Retz always spelled the word "Rais." The barony of Retz first belonged to the House of Retz, then to the Chabot family and the Laval family. Gilles de Rais, a Laval and comrade in arms of Joan of Arc, was executed without an heir, so the barony passed successively to the families of Tournemine, Annebaut and Gondi.

In 1581, it became a duchy, with Albert de Gondi its first duke. His brother Pierre de Gondi became bishop of Paris in 1570 and cardinal in 1587. Pierre was succeeded by his nephews Henri de Gondi (d. 1622) and Jean-François de Gondi (d. 1654), for whom the episcopal see of Paris was erected into an archbishopric in 1622. Finally, Jean François was then succeeded by Pierre's great-nephew Jean François Paul de Gondi.

== Archbishop of Paris ==
Retz received no preferment of importance during Cardinal Richelieu's life. Even after the minister's death, though he was presented to Louis XIII and well received, he found difficulty in attaining the co-adjutorship with reversion of the archbishopric of Paris. But almost immediately after the king's death, Anne of Austria appointed him to the coveted post on All Saints Eve, 1643. Retz, who had, according to some accounts, already plotted against Richelieu, set himself to work to make the utmost political capital out of his position. His uncle had lived in great seclusion; Retz, on the contrary, gradually acquired a very great influence with the populace of the city. This influence he gradually turned against Cardinal Mazarin, which helped lead to the outbreak of the Fronde in October 1648.

Of the two parties who joined the Fronde, Retz could only depend on the bourgeoisie of Paris. He had some speculative tendencies in favour of popular liberties, and even perhaps of republicanism, but represented no real political principle, which inevitably weakened his position. When the breakup of the Fronde came he was left in the lurch, having more than once been in no small danger from his own party. However, because of a misapprehension on the part of Pope Innocent X, he had been made cardinal.

In 1652, he was arrested and imprisoned, first for 15 months at Vincennes, then at Nantes; he escaped after two years, and traveled through Europe, hiding in Holland, Germany and Flanders. He went to Rome more than once, and helped elect Pope Alexander VII. In 1662, Louis XIV received him back into favor, and asked him to formally serve as envoy to Rome several times. For this reconciliation to occur, he resigned his claims to the archbishopric of Paris. He was appointed abbot of St-Denis, and restored to his other benefices with the payment of arrears.

== Later life ==
The last seventeen years of Retz's life were passed partly in his diplomatic duties (he was again in Rome at the papal conclaves of 1667 and 1669), partly in Paris, partly at his estate of Cornmercy, but mostly at Saint-Mihiel in Lorraine. His debts were enormous, and in 1675 he made over to his creditors all his income except twenty thousand livres. He died at Paris on 24 August 1679. During these last years he corresponded with Madame de Sévigné, a relative by marriage.

== Writings ==
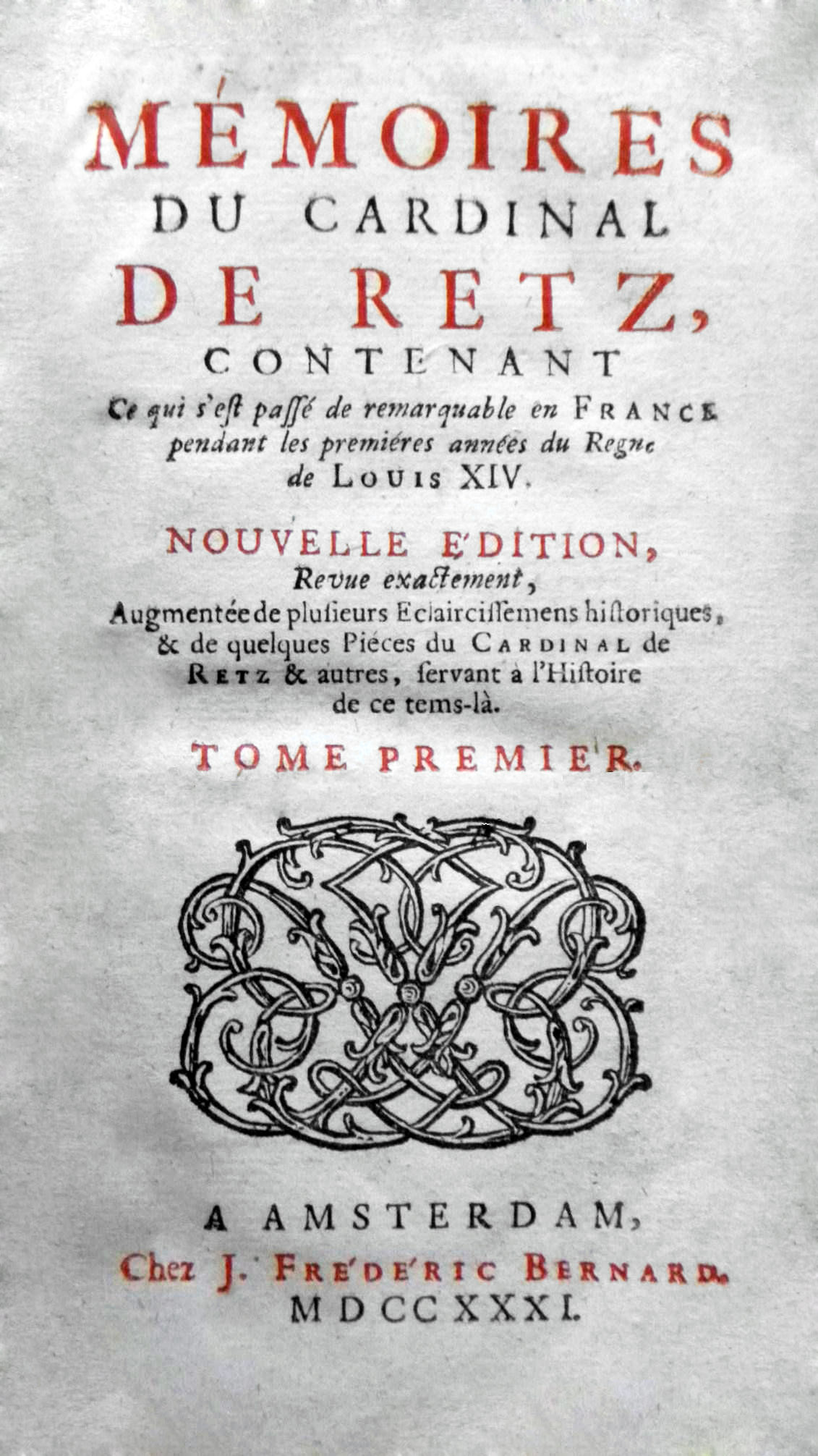
1731 Edition (by Bernard, Amsterdam)

During the last ten years of his life, Retz wrote his Memoirs, which go up to the year 1655.

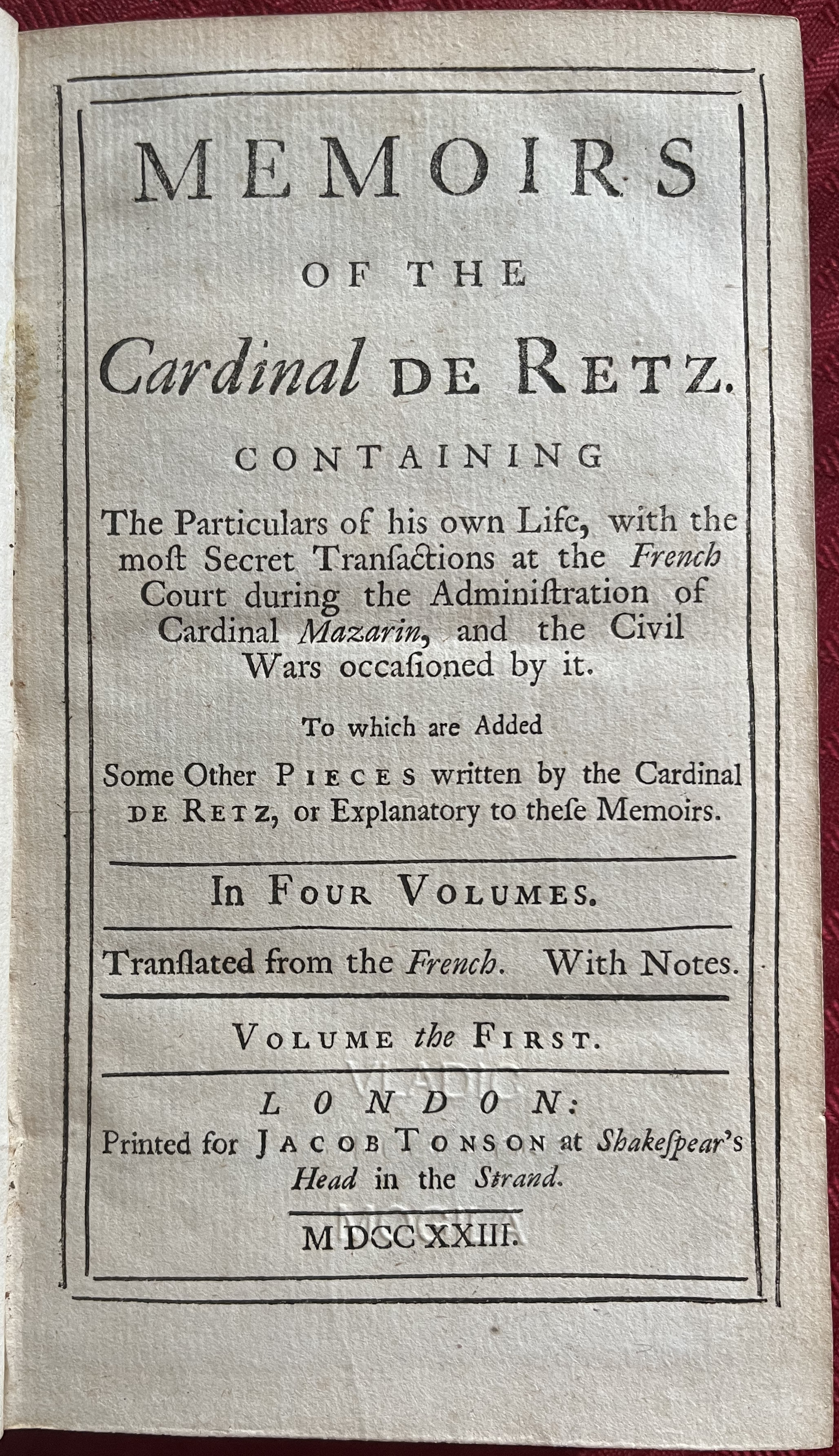
Memoirs of the Cardinal de Retz. Translated from the French. With Notes. London: Printed for Jacob Tonson at Shakespear's Head in the Strand. M DCC XXIII.

They are addressed in the form of narrative to a lady who is not known, though guesses have been made at her identity, some even suggesting Madame de Sévigné herself. In the beginning there are some gaps. They are known for their narrative skill and the verbal portraits of their characters. Alexandre Dumas, père drew heavily on the Memoirs for Vingt ans après. Besides these memoirs and the youthful essay of the Conjuration de Fiesque, Retz has left diplomatic papers, sermons, Mazarinades and correspondence.

Retz and François de La Rochefoucauld, the greatest of the Frondeurs in literary genius, were personal and political enemies, and each left a portrait of the other. De la Rochefoucauld wrote of Retz: "Il a suscité les plus grands désordres dans l'état sans avoir un dessein formé de s'en prévaloir." (He stirred up the greatest disorder in the State, without having a clear plan of how to gain from it).

The Memoirs of the cardinal de Retz were first published in a very imperfect condition in 1717. The first satisfactory edition appeared in the twenty-fourth volume of the collection of Joseph François Michaud and Jean Joseph François Poujoulat (Paris, 1836). In 1870 a complete edition of the works of Retz was begun by Alphonse Feillet in the collection of Grands Ecrivains.

Perhaps his most famous quotation with respect to modern culture was from Vol 2. of his Memoirs, discussing the unrest in the day, with a philosophical reflection,"Il n’y a rien dans ce monde qui n’ait un moment decisif..." (There is nothing in the world that does not have its decisive moment...)

The full translated passage goes on: "It seemed that everyone was surprised and intoxicated by the smoke of the grape harvest; and you will see scenes at the cost of which the past has been nothing but greenery and pastures. There is nothing in the world that does not have its decisive moment, and the masterpiece of good conduct is know and take this moment. If we miss it in the revolution of States, we run the risk of not finding it, or of not noticing it."

Henri Cartier-Bresson used this passage as the keynote to his classic work "Images à la Sauvette" which was renamed in English "The Decisive Moment."

Catholic Church titles
Preceded by Jean-François de Gondi	Archbishop of Paris; 1654–1662	Succeeded by Pierre de Marca
