= Olivier Delourme =

French architect

Olivier Delourme (1660–1729), nicknamed "the architect of Brittany", was a French architect of the "Grand Siècle" renowned for his many achievements still existing, mainly in Morbihan.

== Biography ==
Delourme was born in 1660 in the village of Kerpiton (commune of Loyat) to Jean Delourme and Françoise Launay, a family of literate master masons living in a tenant farm. Many family members were court officers, priests or clerics.

Olivier and his brothers (Jean and Mathurin), people with education, decided to be builders and began as masons, then master masons.

Louis XIV having had the Parlement of Rennes transferred to Vannes in 1675, the councillors had private mansions built there, villas then attracting many building workers. Olivier Delourme moved there when he was not yet 25 years old.

He became a materials trader, but also a shipowner and writer of construction treaties.

At the same time, he trained as an architect, then master architect and was gradually recognized for his work.

He was involved in public works, city architecture, religious monuments, and prestigious private residences.

He married Jeanne Caillot, the daughter of one of his companions with whom he settled at the Manoir du Grador and had many children.

He died prematurely in 1729, not seeing the completion of all his projects.

== Realisations ==
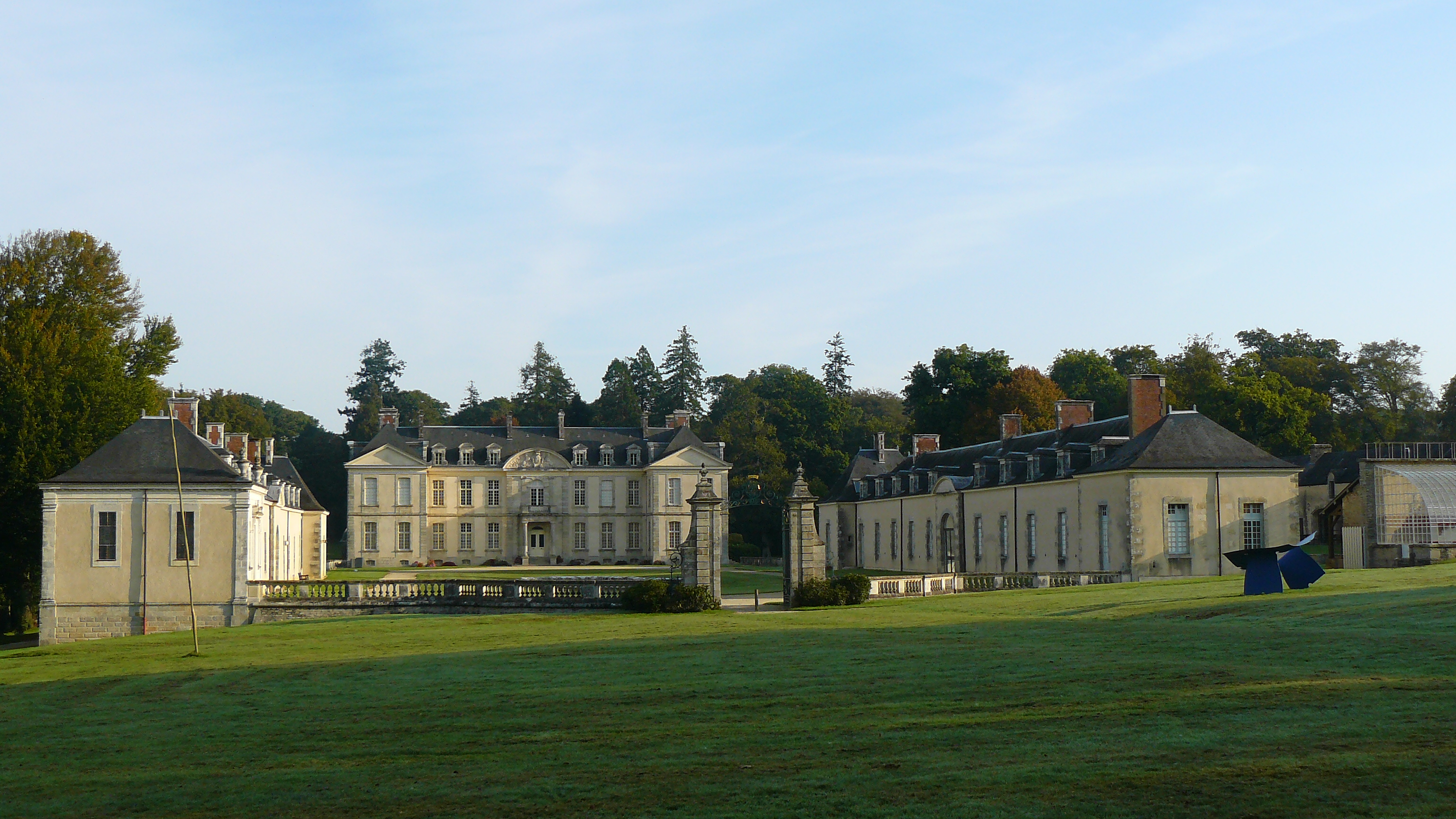
Château de Kerguéhennec

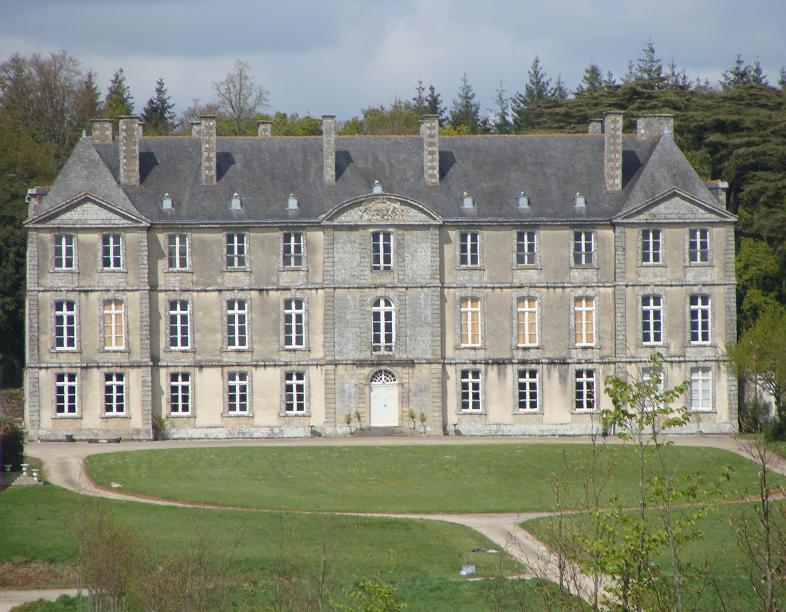
Château de Loyat

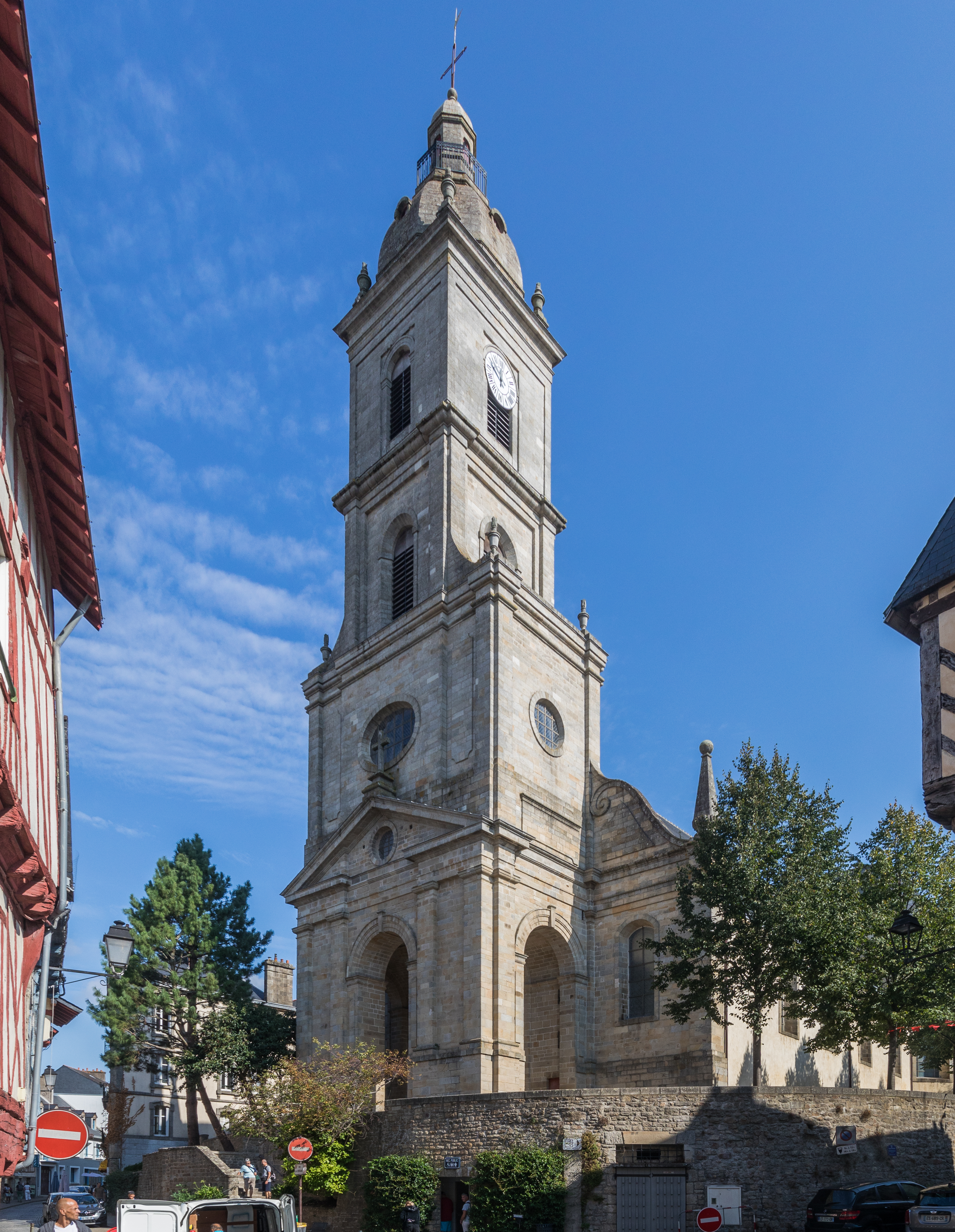
Église Saint-Patern de Vannes

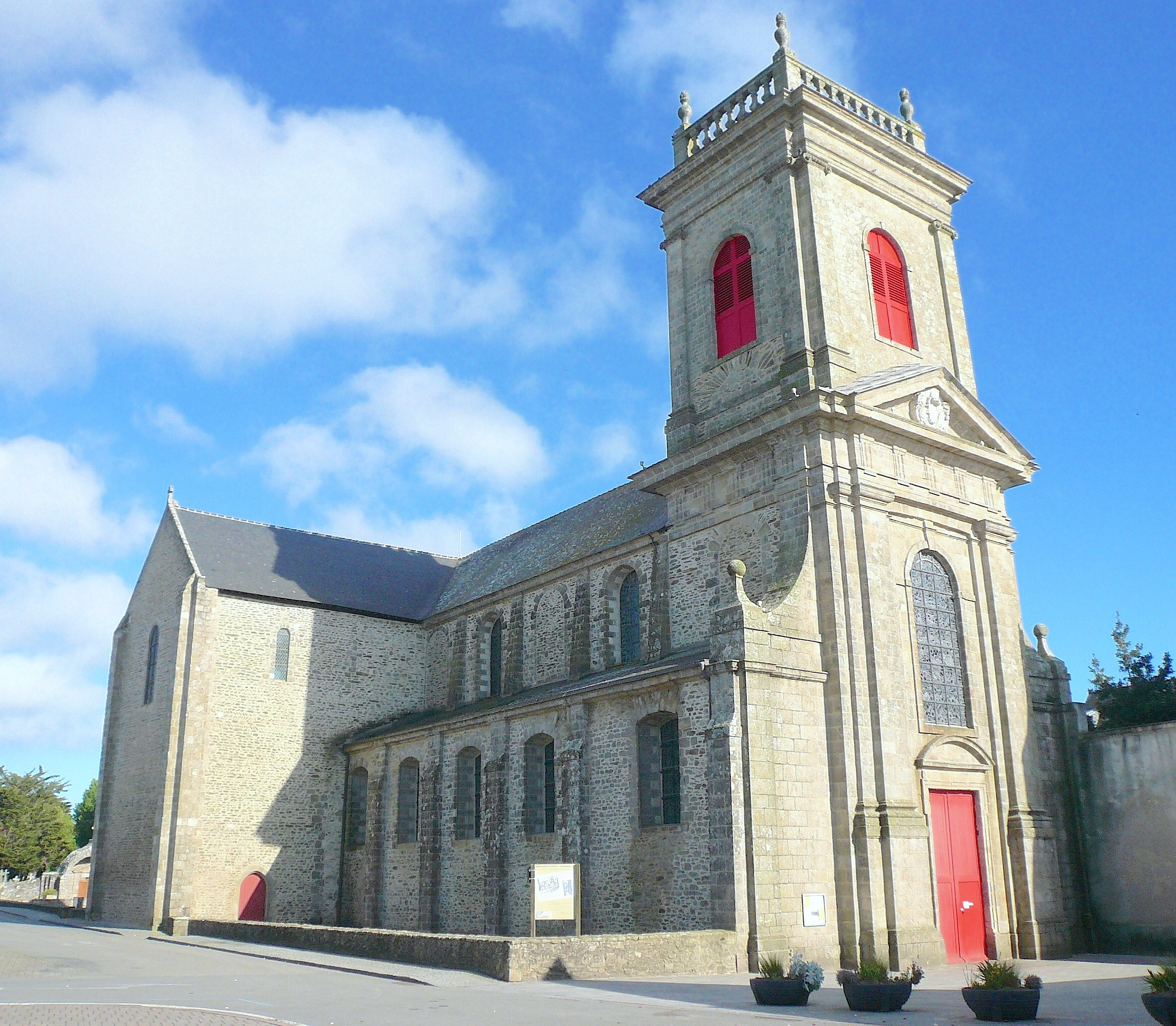
Abbaye Saint-Gildas de Rhuys

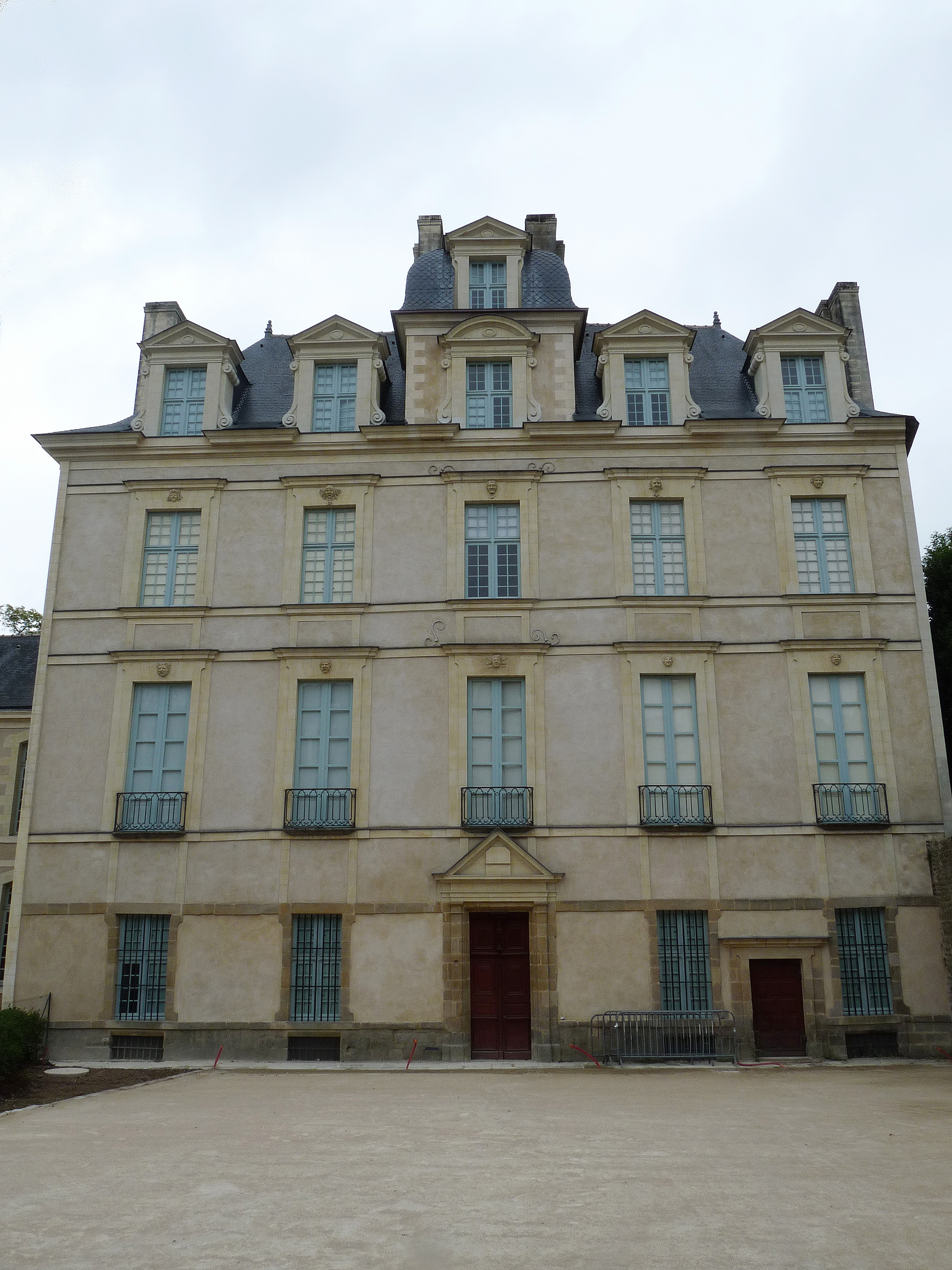
Hôtel de Limur in Vannes

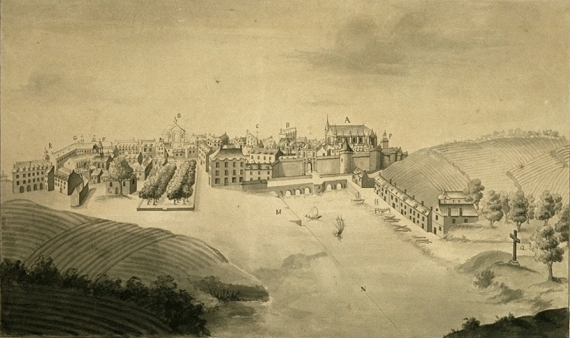
Canal of the Port de Vannes

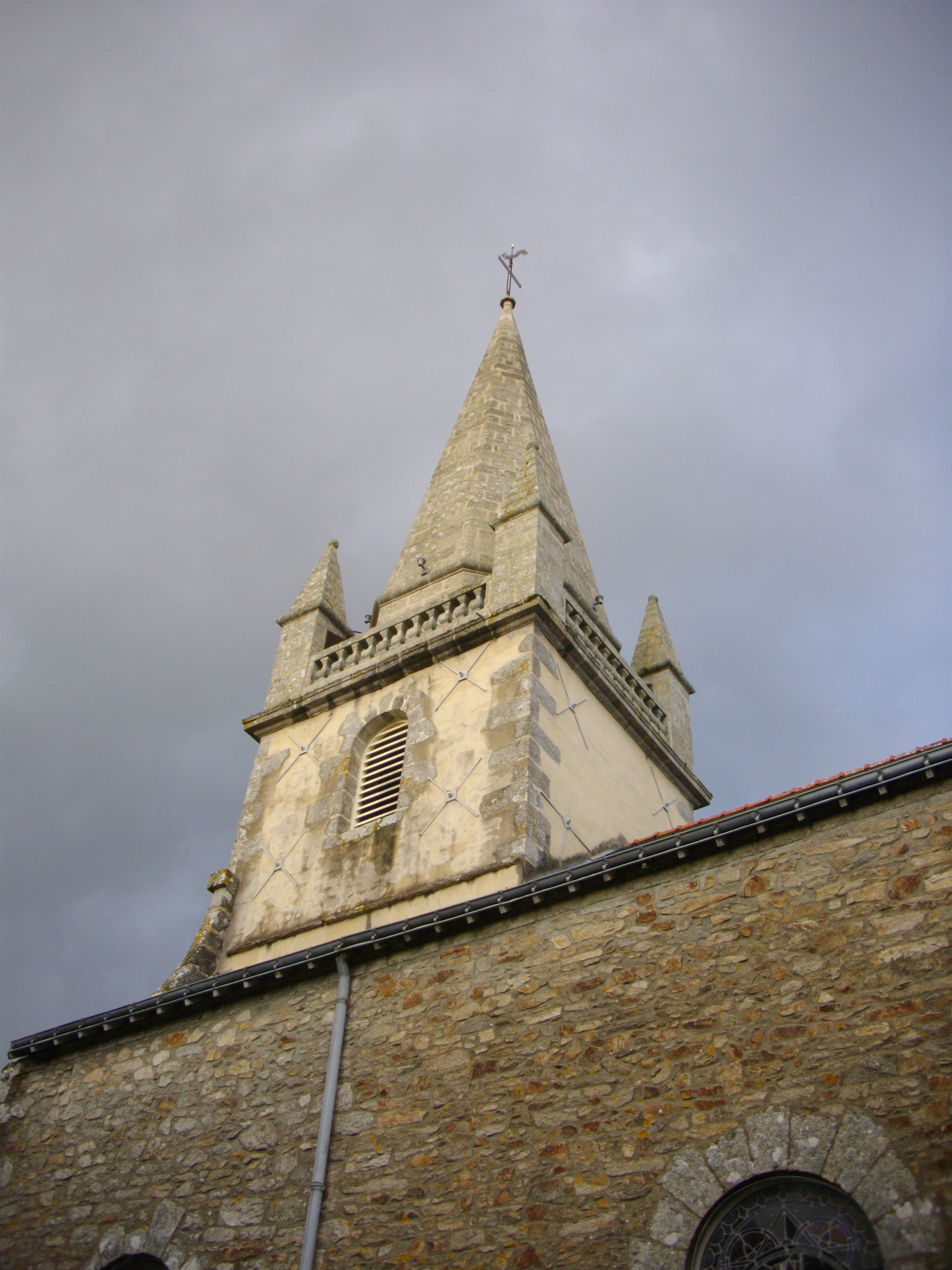
Bell tower of the parish church of St Avé.

== Urban works ==
In Vannes, his achievements are numerous, both as master architect designer and master builder of works. He also helped to reduce the gap between these two tasks.

In particular, he was ordered plans for the steps of the old town hall (currently the staircase at the Hôtel de Limur), as well as the redevelopment of the canal towards the port.

== Religious works ==
He rebuilt churches like the belltower of the parish church of Saint Gervais - Saint Protais of Saint-Avé, the church of Saint-Gildas-de-Rhuys, and those of Prières Abbey in Billiers, and of Le Mené (now destroyed).

He participated in the work of the Sainte-Croix de Quimperlé abbey. He was also an architect for the abbeys of the Benedictines Saint-Gildas abbey housing the Congregation of Saint Maur, then the Sisters of Charity of St. Louis.

In 1727, he provided plans for the present church of Église Saint-Patern de Vannes.

=== Chateaux ===
The de Coëtlogon family, which included illustrious military, judicial and religious officers, bought the Château de Loyat in 1676.

René-Charles de Coëtlogon, attorney general-syndic, decided to build a new castle and called on Olivier Delourme as architect, designer and director. The work spread out between 1718 and 1734.

The other main work by Delourme is the Château of Kerguéhennec in Bignan (nicknamed the Breton Versailles). The Hogguer family of St. Gallen, in Switzerland, traders in paintings and finances, investing in Lorient in the French East India Company, called on Olivier Delourme to rebuild Kerguéhennec. But their ephemeral fortune forced them to sell the property to Duke Rohan-Chabot in 1732.
