= Jean-François de Gondi =

French archbishop (1584–1654)

- Archbishop of Paris
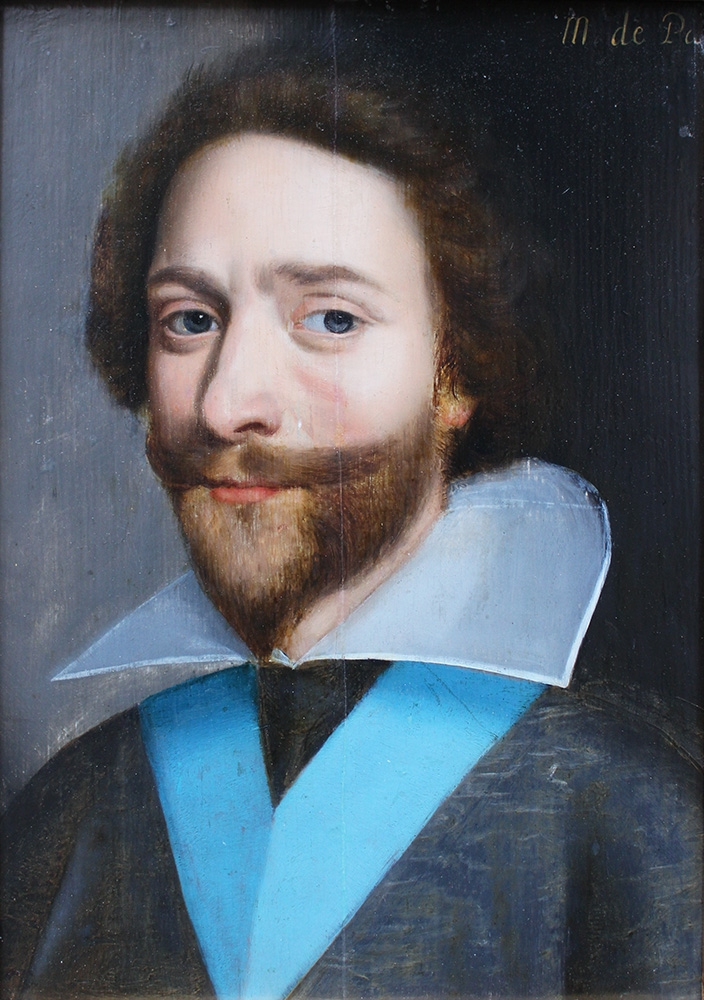
- Church: Catholic Church
- Archdiocese: Archdiocese of Paris
- In office: 14 November 1622 – 21 March 1654
- Predecessor: Henri de Gondi
- Successor: Jean François Paul de Gondi

Orders
- Consecration: 19 February 1623 by François d'Escoubleau de Sourdis

Personal details
- Born: 1584 Paris, Kingdom of France
- Died: 21 March 1654 (aged 69–70) Paris, Kingdom of France

Jean-François de Gondi (1584 – 21 March 1654) was the first archbishop of Paris, from 1622 to 1654.

== Life ==
Gondi was born in Paris. He was the son of Albert de Gondi and Claude Catherine de Clermont. He was a member of the Gondi family, which had held the bishopric of Paris for nearly a century, and would continue to do so after him. Jean-François succeeded his brother Henri de Gondi. Henri had himself succeeded his uncle Pierre de Gondi (1533–1616), cardinal and commendatory abbot of the abbeys of Saint-Aubin-d'Angers, La Chaume, Sainte-Croix de Quimperlé and Buzay.

He refused his blessing to the Company of the Blessed Sacrament, even though Louis XIII wrote him a personal letter in 1631 requesting him to do so.

Following his death in Paris, he was succeeded by his nephew Jean-François Paul de Gondi, cardinal of Retz.

== Notes and references ==
Catholic Church titles
Preceded by Henri de Gondi	Archbishop of Paris; 1622–1654	Succeeded by Jean François Paul de Gondi
