= Église Saint-Patern de Vannes =

Church in Vannes, France

Coordinates: 47.6594°N 2.7540°W

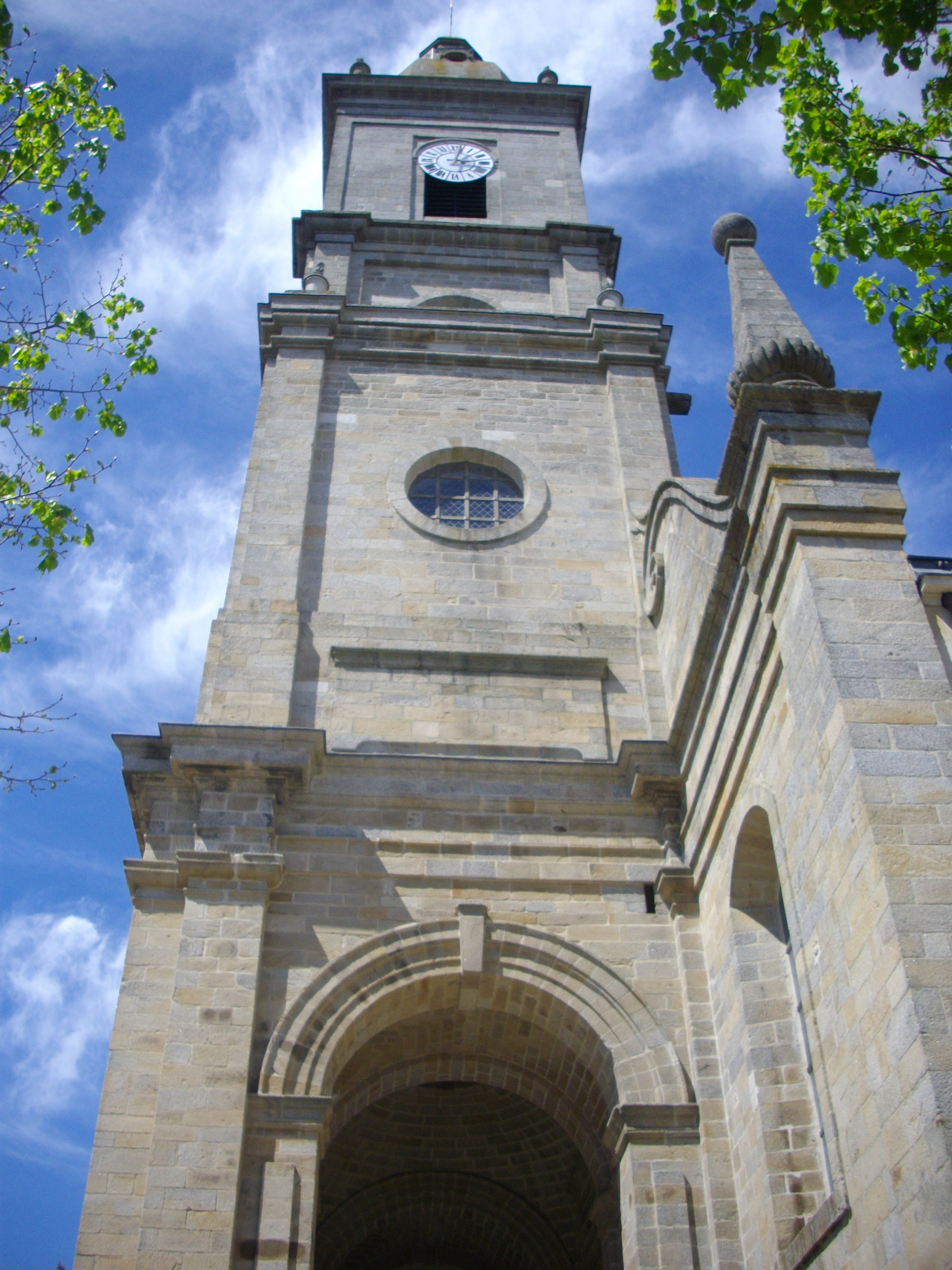
- Tower and tower porch of the Église Saint-Patern de Vannes

Religion
- Affiliation: Roman Catholic Church
- Province: Bishopric of Vannes
- Region: Morbihan
- Ecclesiastical or organisational status: Cathedral
- Status: Active

Location
- Location: Vannes, France
- Interactive map of Église Saint-Patern de Vannes

Architecture
- Type: church
- Groundbreaking: 11th century
- Completed: 19th century

Église Saint-Patern de Vannes (Saint Patern of Vannes Church) is a Roman Catholic Church in Vannes, France.

== Saint Patern ==
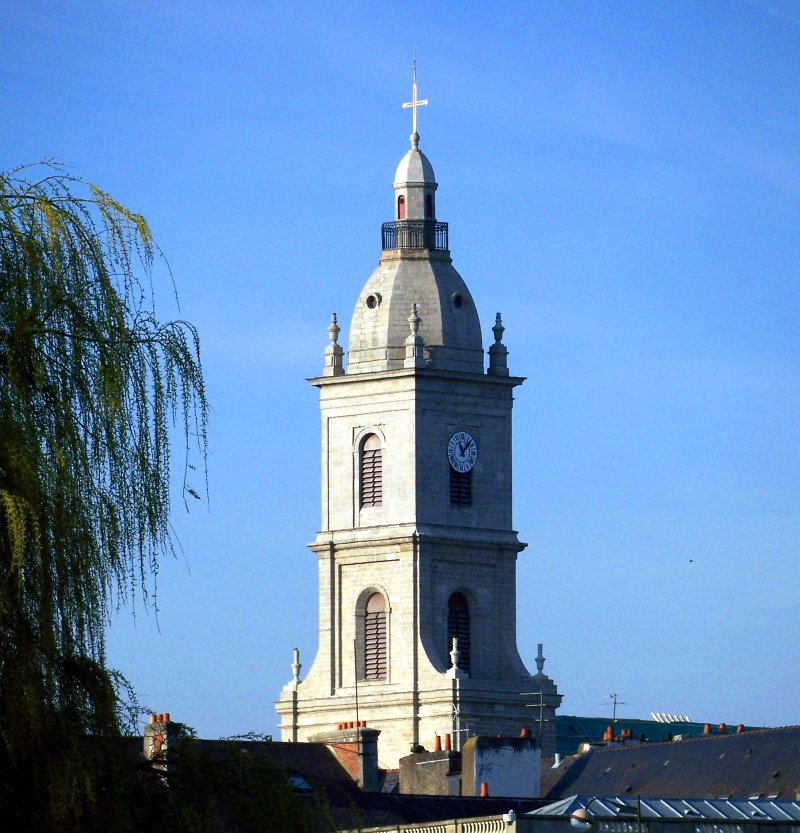
The church's tower

The church stands in Vannes's rue de la Fontaine and rue Saint-Patern. The church was built on the existing foundations of a much older church, which held the relics of Saint Patern (the first bishop of Vannes). The original church had been built in the 11th century and had replaced the other church which had suffered damage at the hands of Norman invaders at the turn of the 9th and 10th-centuries.

It was in 1721 when a furious storm badly damaged the tower of the church. On 9 May 1726 another storm hit the town and sent the rest of the tower tumbling, crushing half of the nave and part of the choir. The building, therefore, required a major reconstruction and this reconstruction was started in 1727 under the direction of the architect Olivier Delourme (or de Lourme) and the mason Guillo. Good progress was made with the first stone being laid on the 18 September 1727 and ten years later inauguration of the major part of the cathedral was possible. By 1769, the nave foundations were completed, although the spire of the tower was not completed until 1826 following a successful appeal for funds organised by the rector Guénanten.

== The building ==
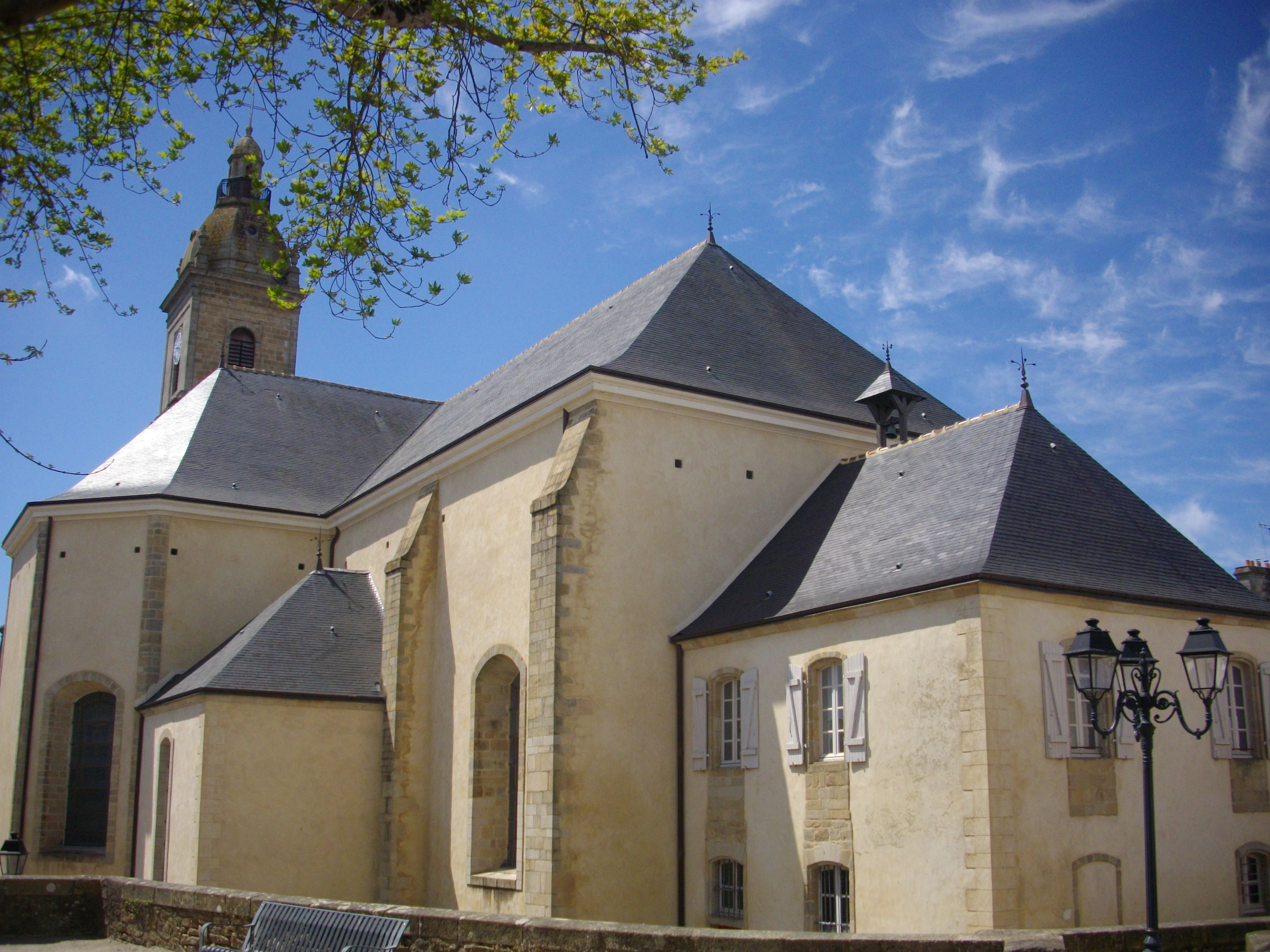
The apse or chevet

The building comprises a nave with two narrow aisles giving access to three side chapels, these furnished with six altarpieces. On the north side chapels the altarpieces are dedicated to the Immaculate Conception, sainte-Thérèse d'Avila and the "Vraie-Croix" whilst on the south side the dedications are to saint Roch, saint Fiacre and Notre-Dame de Délivrance.

The north transept has an altarpiece dedicated to Sainte-Parenté and the South transept has an altarpiece dedicated to saint Isidore. The transept also holds a further two altarpieces in white marble, each with four columns. The painting which is part of the altarpiece in the south transept depicts "Christ aux outrages", whilst that in the north transept depicts the "Presentation in the temple".

The altarpiece entitled the "Résurrection du Christ" in the choir area dates to 1744, the sides of this altarpiece holding statues of saint Patern and the Virgin Mary. The choir area comprises three crossings, a painting, columns of black marble supporting a curvilinear corniche above which is another niche. The main altar shaped like a tomb in white marble and dating to the 19th century is surmounted on each side by adoring angels. In this area, wooden niches hold statues of saint Peter and Saint Paul.

== The pulpit ==
This dates to 1813 and on it are carved the name of the rector Noël Pasco and several of the church officials involved in its erection.

== The chapel of Notre-Dame de Délivrance ==
In this chapel is a reliquary in the form of a cross and made in cast iron, as well as a stone statue dating to the 18th-century of "Notre-Dame de Délivrance".

== Painting of Saint Roch ==
The church has an oil painting by Lhermitais of Saint Roch which dates to 1747.

== Stained glass windows ==
The stained-glass windows in the choir area date to 1737 and were replaced in 1882 and again in 1918. The window by the church's north door dates to 1923 and depicts "Le Christ entouré de huit enfants" (Christ surrounded by eight children). It was a gift to the church from the Mitier family of Léhélec.

== Stalls ==
During the church's restoration of 2006/2007 some 17th-century stalls were brought into the church as well as the statue "l'Enfant Jésus de Prague".

== Tro Breizh ==
Given the presence in the church of some bone fragments of Saint Patern, a visit to the church was one of the seven stages of this pilgrimage so popular in the Middle Ages, the task for the pilgrim was to visit the tombs of the seven founding saints of Brittany, the ancient bishops Brieuc, Malo, Samson, Corentin, Pol, Tugwal and Patern in Vannes. Discontinued at the end of the Middle Ages, the "Tro Breiz" has recently regained some popularity and pilgrims, hikers and enthusiasts of Breton history are again seeking out the old pilgrim pathways.

== The transept ==
The transept walls are decorated with various paintings, including one entitled "L'Assomption de la Vierge" by Alexandre Evariste Fragonard, son of the famous Jean-Honoré Fragonard. The painting dates to 1837.
