= Claude-François Lysarde de Radonvilliers =

Claude-François Lizarde de Radonvilliers (1709, Decize, Nièvre – 20 April 1789) was a French churchman and teacher.

In 1763, Lizarde de Radonvilliers was elected to the Académie française. From 1770 until his death, he was commendatory abbot of Villeneuve Abbey near Nantes, then in Brittany.

| Preceded by Pierre Carlet de Chamblain de Marivaux | Seat 24 of the Académie française 1763–1789 | Succeeded by Constantin-François Chassebœuf |
