= Rouans =

- Commune
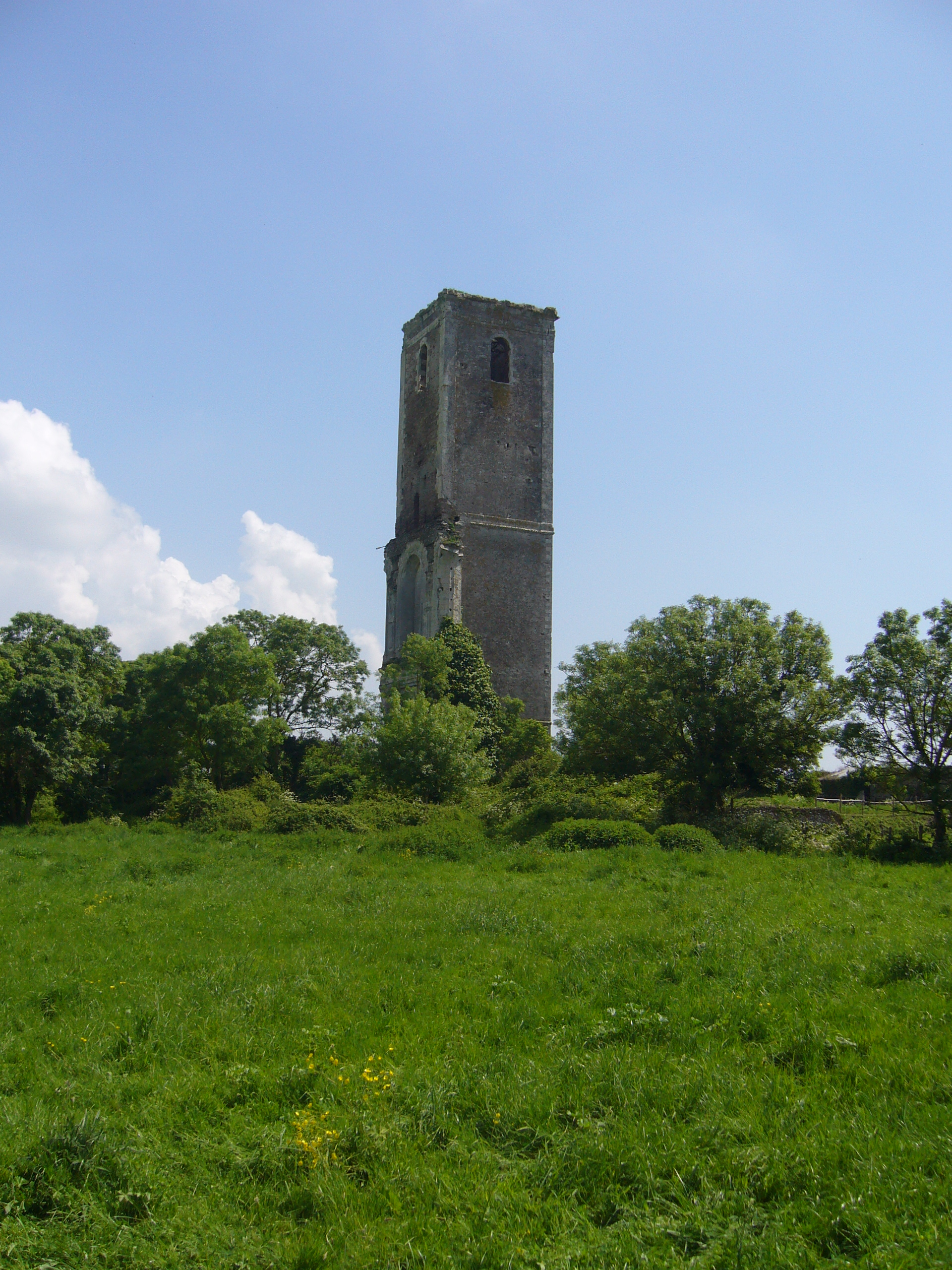
- Tower of Buzay Abbey

- Coat of arms
- Location of Rouans
- Location within France Location within Pays de la Loire
- Coordinates: 47°11′00″N 1°52′00″W
- Country: France
- Region: Pays de la Loire
- Department: Loire-Atlantique
- Arrondissement: Nantes
- Canton: Machecoul-Saint-Même
- Intercommunality: CA Pornic Agglo Pays de Retz

Government
  - Mayor (2020–2026): Jacques Ripoche
- Area^{1}: 37.73 km^{2} (14.57 sq mi)
- Highest elevation: 60 m (200 ft)
- Lowest elevation: 0 m (0 ft)
- Population (2023): 3,301
  - Density: 87.49/km^{2} (226.6/sq mi)
- Time zone: UTC+01:00 (CET)
  - Summer (DST): UTC+02:00 (CEST)
- INSEE/Postal code: 44145 /44640
- ^{1} French Land Register data, which excludes lakes, ponds, glaciers > 1 km^{2} (0.386 sq mi or 247 acres) and river estuaries.

Rouans (French pronunciation: [ʁwɑ̃s]; Breton: Rodent) is a commune in the Loire-Atlantique department in western France.

== Population ==
Historical population

Year	Pop.	±% p.a.
1793	2,114	—
1821	2,164	+0.08%
1846	2,245	+0.15%
1872	2,258	+0.02%
1901	2,191	−0.10%
1926	1,642	−1.15%
1946	1,514	−0.40%
1962	1,520	+0.02%
1968	1,443	−0.86%

Year	Pop.	±% p.a.
1975	1,447	+0.04%
1982	1,710	+2.41%
1990	1,891	+1.27%
1999	2,131	+1.34%
2007	2,506	+2.05%
2012	2,734	+1.76%
2017	2,956	+1.57%
2023	3,301	+1.86%

Source: EHESS and INSEE (1968-2023)

== See also ==
- Communes of the Loire-Atlantique department
- Buzay Abbey
