= Loyat =

Commune in Brittany, France

Loyat Louad
- Commune
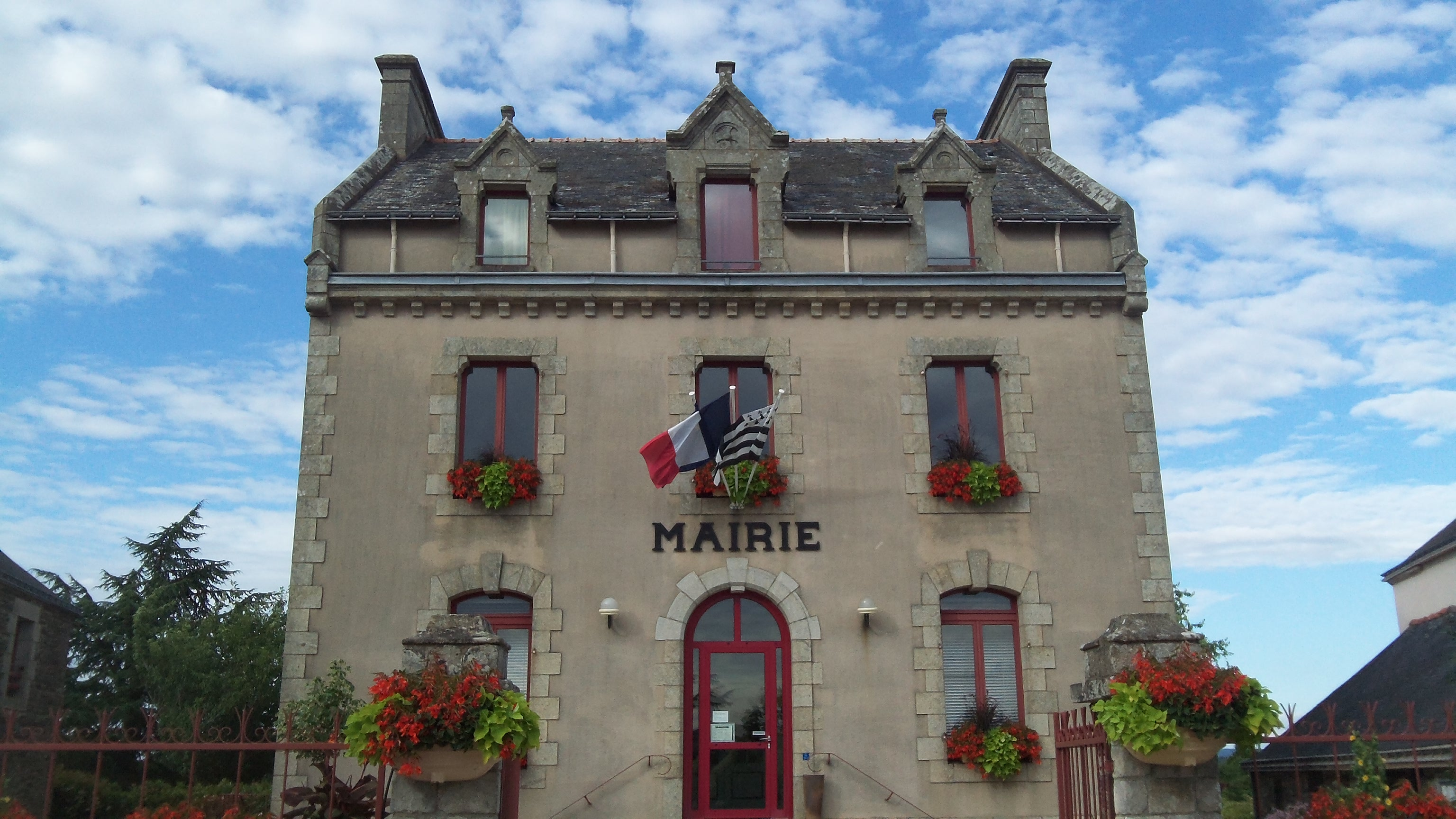
- The town hall in Loyat

- Coat of arms
- Location of Loyat
- Location within France Location within Brittany
- Coordinates: 47°59′27″N 2°22′56″W
- Country: France
- Region: Brittany
- Department: Morbihan
- Arrondissement: Pontivy
- Canton: Ploërmel
- Intercommunality: Ploërmel

Government
  - Mayor (2026–32): Didier Bourne
- Area^{1}: 41.52 km^{2} (16.03 sq mi)
- Highest elevation: 130 m (430 ft)
- Lowest elevation: 32 m (105 ft)
- Population (2023): 1,750
  - Density: 42.1/km^{2} (109/sq mi)
- Time zone: UTC+01:00 (CET)
  - Summer (DST): UTC+02:00 (CEST)
- INSEE/Postal code: 56122 /56800
- ^{1} French Land Register data, which excludes lakes, ponds, glaciers > 1 km^{2} (0.386 sq mi or 247 acres) and river estuaries.

Loyat (French pronunciation: [lɔja]; Breton: Louad) is a commune in the Morbihan department of Brittany in north-western France.

== Geography ==
The village is located in the northeast of Morbihan, 6.5 km (4.0 mi) north of Ploërmel. Historically it belongs to Upper Brittany. Before French Revolution, the parish belonged to Diocese of Saint-Malo.

== Map ==
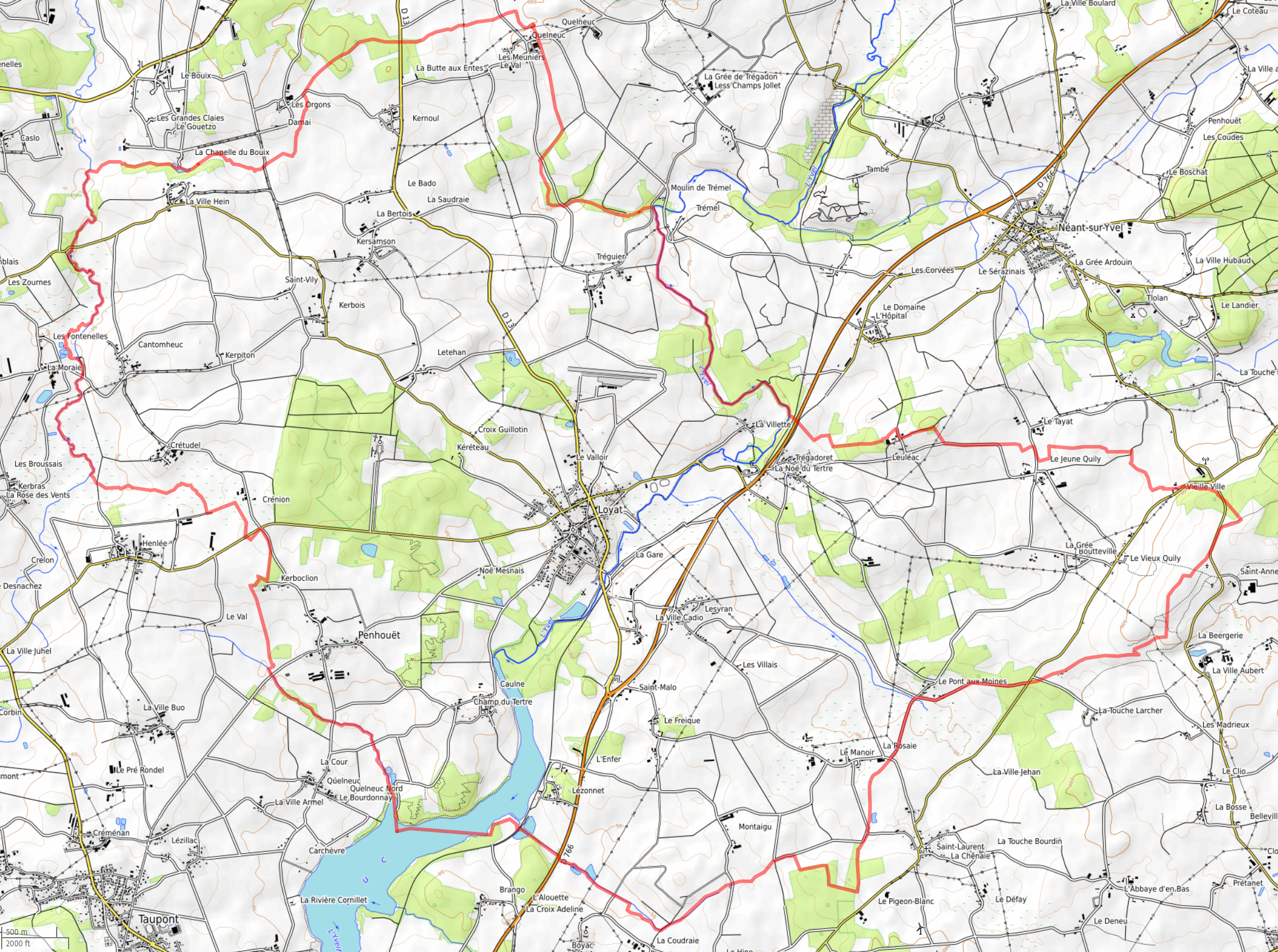
Carte topographique de la commune de Loyat.

== See also ==
- Communes of the Morbihan department
- Olivier Delourme
