= Prières Abbey =

Abbey in Morbihan, France

Coordinates: 47°31′27″N 02°29′00″W

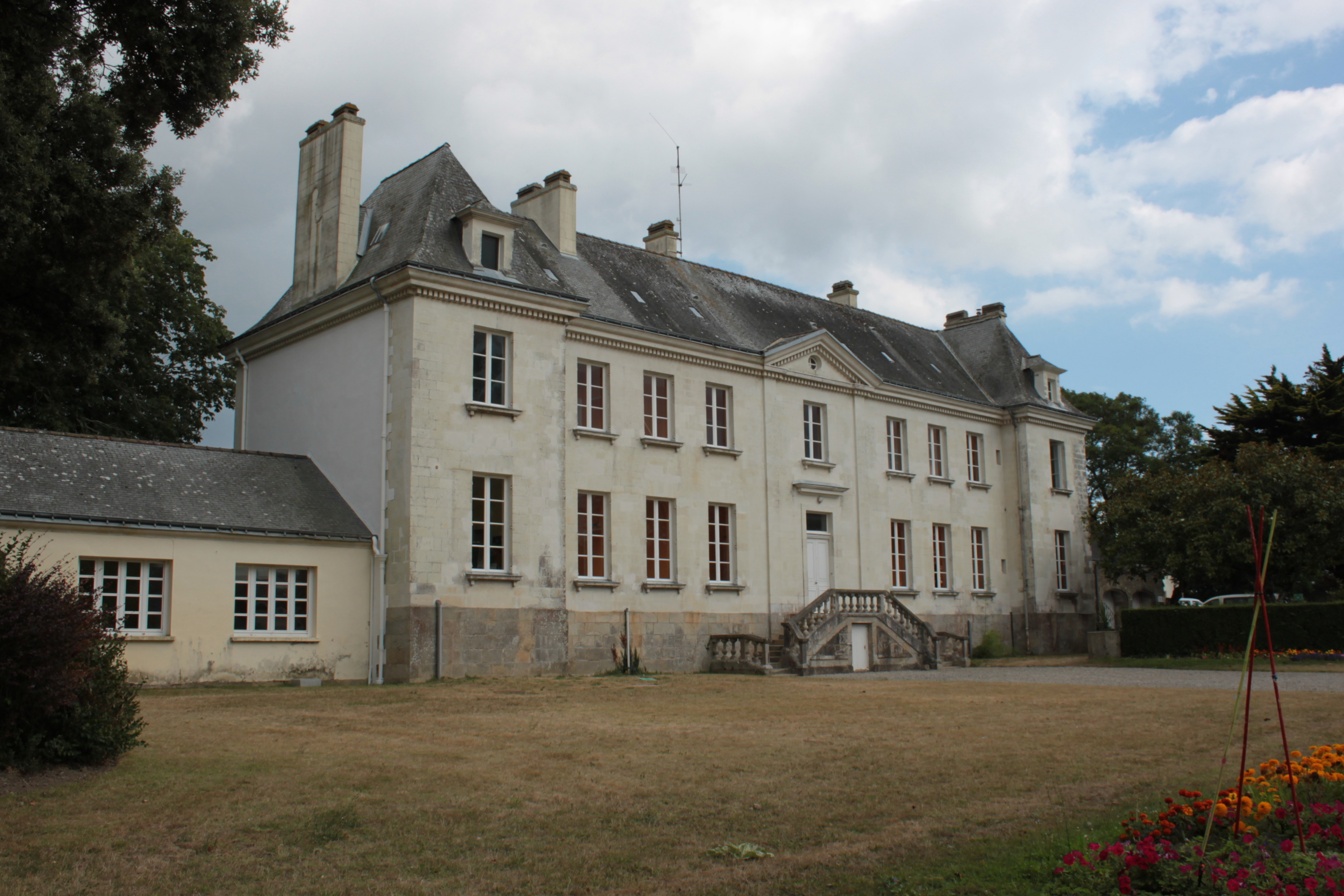
Remaining building of the abbey

Prières Abbey (French: Abbaye de Prières or Notre-Dame de Prières; Latin: Abbatia de Precibus) is a former Cistercian monastery in the commune of Billiers in the department of Morbihan, Brittany, France, about 28 kilometres southeast of Vannes near the coast and the mouth of the River Vilaine.

== History ==
The abbey was founded in 1251 and richly endowed by Duke John I of Brittany, as penance for his earlier destruction of the Priory of Saint-Pabu and annexation of its lands during the construction of the Château de Suscinio. The new abbey was a daughter house of Buzay Abbey (of the filiation of Clairvaux), from where the first monks came. Among its temporal endowments were the saltpans of the Guérande peninsula.

The abbey was rebuilt in the 17th century. In 1791, in the French Revolution, it was dissolved. The premises were subsequently used as a barracks. The site passed into private hands in 1801, after which most of the buildings were demolished. The remaining parts are now used by a rehabilitation centre.

== Description ==
Of the church, rebuilt in the early 18th century by the architect Olivier Delourme, there remain only the tower and part of the former transept converted into a chapel that contains the remains of the tombs of Duke John I (d. 1286) and of Isabella of Castile (d. 1328), the second wife of Duke John III of Brittany. Also extant are the 18th-century guest lodgings, some service buildings and the precinct wall of 1699.

== Sources ==
- Mollat, G. (1907). "Le mausolée d'Isabelle de Castille, duchesse de Bretagne, à l'abbaye de Prières". Annales de Bretagne et des Pays de l'Ouest (in French). 23 (3): 394–396.
- Bernard Peugniez, 2001: Routier cistercien. Abbayes et sites. France, Belgique, Luxembourg, Suisse. (new expanded edition, p. 90). Éditions Gaud, Moisenay ISBN 2-84080-044-6
- Jh.-M. Le Mené: Abbaye de Prières in Bulletin et Mémoires de la société polymathique du Morbihan, 1903, pp. 8–80
