= Henri de Gondi (cardinal) =

French Catholic cardinal (1572–1622)

His Eminence Henri de Gondi
- Cardinal de Retz, Bishop of Paris
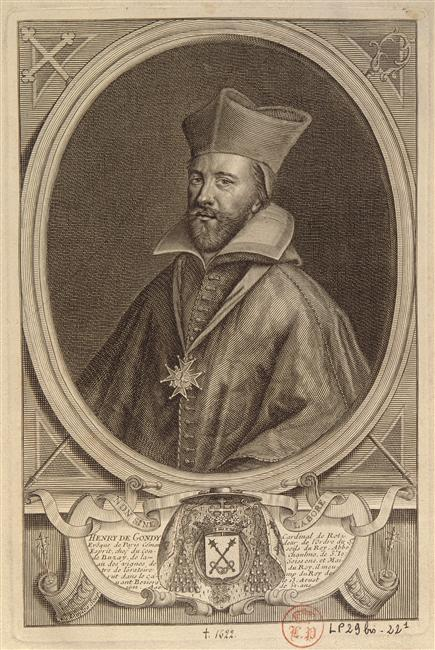
- Henri de Gondi
- Church: Roman Catholic Church
- Appointed: 2 November 1596
- Term ended: 13 August 1622

Orders
- Consecration: 1 March 1598 by Pierre de Gondi
- Created cardinal: 26 March 1618 by Paul V

Personal details
- Born: 1572 Paris, Kingdom of France
- Died: 13 August 1622 (aged 49-50) Paris, Kingdom of France
- Coat of arms

Henri de Gondi (1572 – 13 August 1622) was a French bishop and cardinal of the Gondi family. He was the son of Albert de Gondi, duc de Retz and Claude Catherine de Clermont-Tonnerre. He succeeded his uncle Pierre de Gondi as bishop of Paris in 1598 and was succeeded on his death by his younger brother Jean-François de Gondi. He was made a cardinal in 1618.

Catholic Church titles
| Preceded by Pierre de Gondi | Bishop of Paris; 1598–1622 | Succeeded by Jean-François de Gondi (as Archbishop of Paris) |
