= Pierre de Gondi =

French bishop and cardinal (1533–1616)

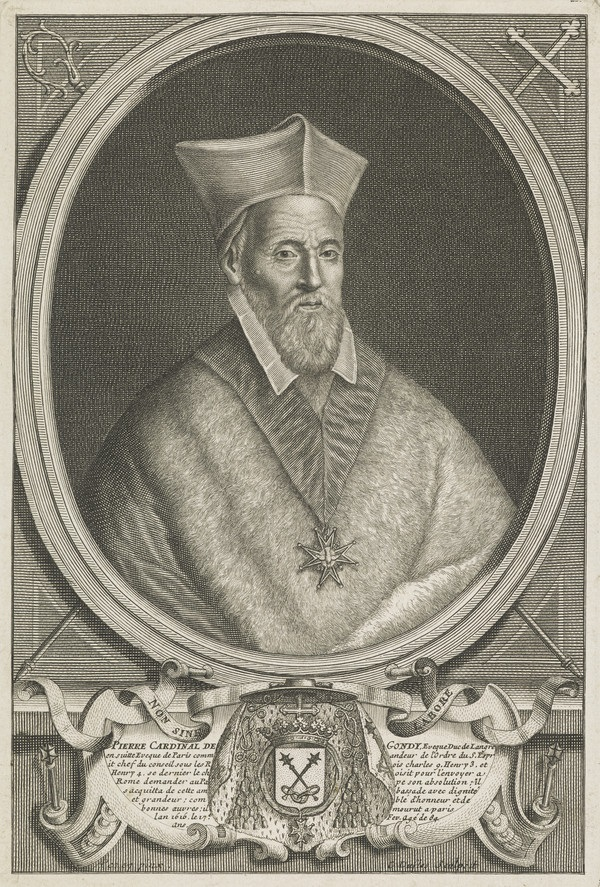
Pierre de Gondi by Claude Duflos

Pierre de Gondi, cardinal de Retz (1533–1616) was a French bishop and cardinal of the Gondi family.

== Life ==
Born in Lyon, he was a brother of Albert de Gondi (two of whose sons, Henri and Jean-François, succeeded Pierre as bishop of Paris) and a protégé of Catherine de Médicis. In turn, he became bishop of Langres (1565), bishop of Paris (1570), chancellor and grand almoner to Elisabeth of Austria, wife of Charles IX of France.

He was created cardinal in 1587.

Gondi undertook several missions to Rome under Henry III of France and Henry IV of France and attended the 1592 papal conclave.

== Sources ==
- House of Gondi on web.genealogie

Catholic Church titles
Preceded by Guillaume Viole	Bishop of Paris; 1573–1598	Succeeded by Henri de Gondi
Records
Preceded by Francesco Mantica	Oldest living Member of the Sacred College; 30 January 1614 - 17 February 1616	Succeeded by Domenico Toschi
