= 1572 =

1572 in various calendars
- Gregorian calendar: 1572; MDLXXII
- Ab urbe condita: 2325
- Armenian calendar: 1021; ԹՎ ՌԻԱ
- Assyrian calendar: 6322
- Balinese saka calendar: 1493–1494
- Bengali calendar: 978–979
- Berber calendar: 2522
- English Regnal year: 14 Eliz. 1 – 15 Eliz. 1
- Buddhist calendar: 2116
- Burmese calendar: 934
- Byzantine calendar: 7080–7081
- Chinese calendar: 辛未年 (Metal Goat); 4269 or 4062 — to — 壬申年 (Water Monkey); 4270 or 4063
- Coptic calendar: 1288–1289
- Discordian calendar: 2738
- Ethiopian calendar: 1564–1565
- Hebrew calendar: 5332–5333
- Hindu calendars
- Vikram Samvat: 1628–1629
- Shaka Samvat: 1493–1494
- Kali Yuga: 4672–4673
- Holocene calendar: 11572
- Igbo calendar: 572–573
- Iranian calendar: 950–951
- Islamic calendar: 979–980
- Japanese calendar: Genki 3 (元亀３年)
- Javanese calendar: 1491–1492
- Julian calendar: 1572; MDLXXII
- Korean calendar: 3905
- Minguo calendar: 340 before ROC 民前340年
- Nanakshahi calendar: 104
- Thai solar calendar: 2114–2115
- Tibetan calendar: ལྕགས་མོ་ལུག་ལོ་ (female Iron-Sheep); 1698 or 1317 or 545 — to — ཆུ་ཕོ་སྤྲེ་ལོ་ (male Water-Monkey); 1699 or 1318 or 546

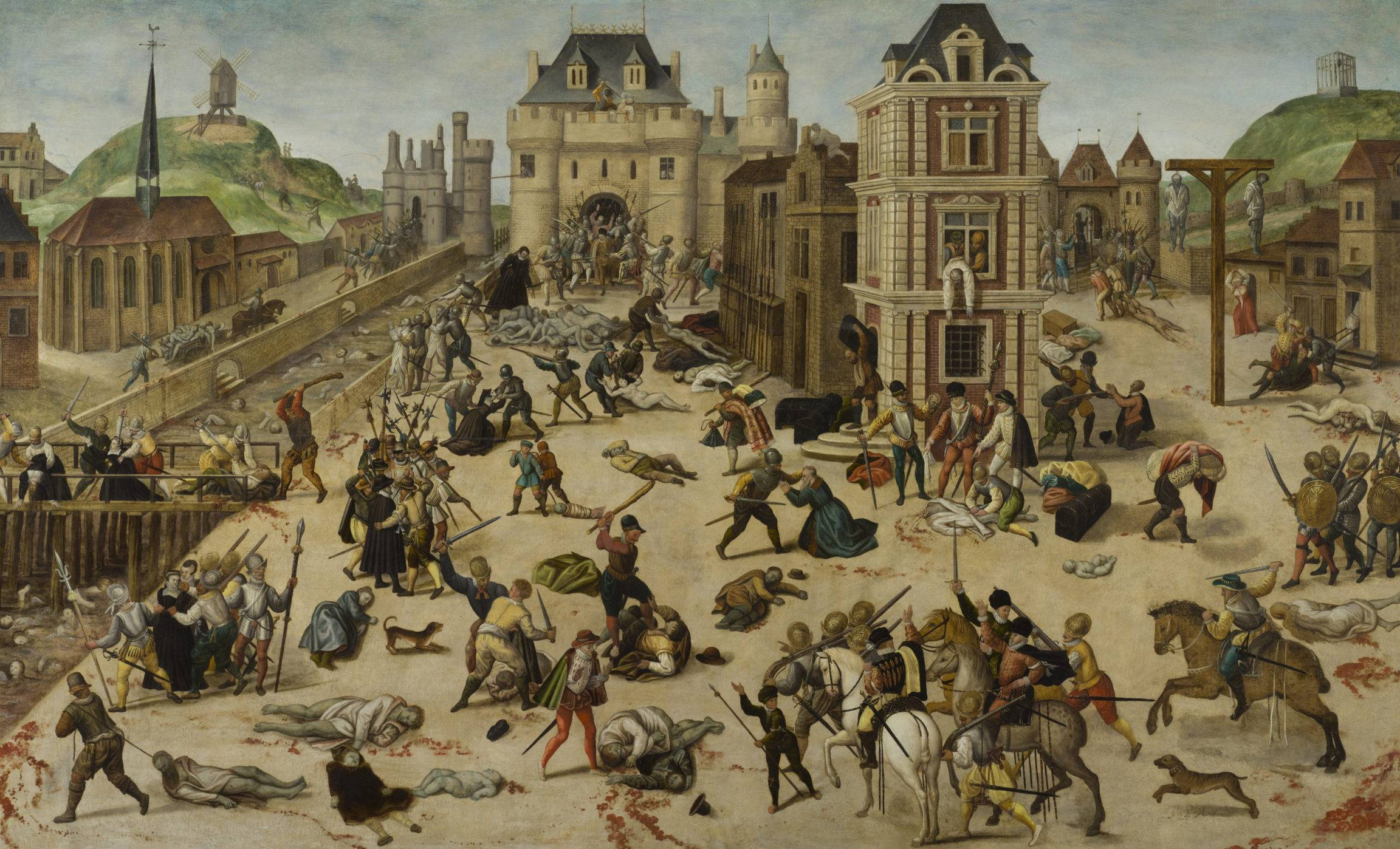
August 24: St. Bartholomew's Day massacre

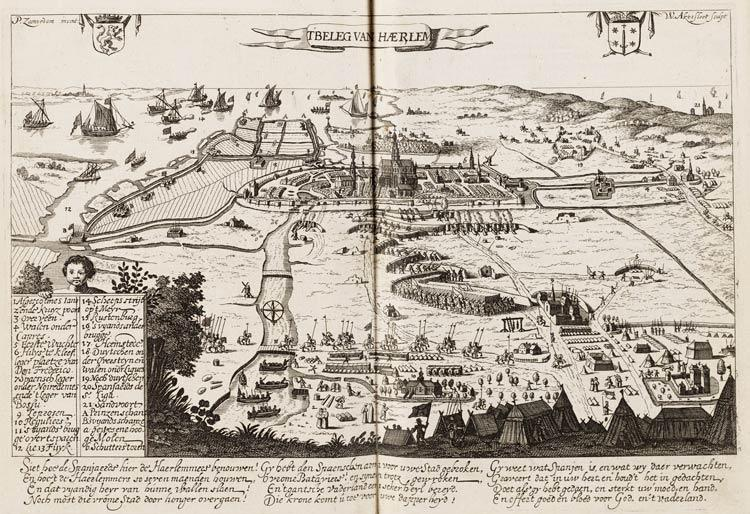
December 11: start of the Siege of Haarlem

Year 1572 (MDLXXII) was a leap year starting on Tuesday of the Julian calendar.

== Events ==
=== January–March ===
- January 16 – Thomas Howard, 4th Duke of Norfolk, is tried for treason, for his part in the Ridolfi plot to restore Catholicism in England. He is executed on June 2.
- February 13 – Elizabeth I of England issues a proclamation which revokes all commissions, on account of the frauds which they had fostered.
- February 19 – Harrow School is founded, with a royal charter from Queen Elizabeth I of England.
- February 28 – In what is now the Rajasthan state in India, Maharana Pratap is crowned as the new Rana of Mewar at the Kingdom's capital at Udaipur after the death of his father, Udai Singh II.
- March 2 – Mem de Sá, the Portuguese Governor-General of Brazil, dies after 14 years in office. He is succeeded by Lourenço da Veiga.
- March 11 – Pope Pius V issues the papal bull Supremi omnipotentis Dei, granting an indulgence reducing 50 days of punishment in the afterlife for Roman Catholics who recited the penitential psalms.
- March 28 – Queen Elizabeth I of England summons a new Parliament, which assembles on May 4.

=== April–June ===
- April 1 – Capture of Brielle: The Sea Beggars, Netherlandish Calvinist rebels, capture the port city of Brielle. This leads to a wave of uprisings in Holland and Zeeland against Spanish Habsburg rule, leaving most of those provinces (with the exception of Amsterdam) under rebel control.
- May 13 – Pope Gregory XIII succeeds Pope Pius V, as the 226th pope.
- June 14 (4th day of 5th month, Genki 3) – At the Battle of Kizaki, Shimazu Yoshihiro leads an army of just 300 men to defeat the 3,000 strong Ito clan of Itō Yoshisuke.
- June 25 – The Sea Beggars capture the city of Gorkum; several Roman Catholic priests are imprisoned.

=== July–September ===
- July 4 – The city council of Haarlem, one of the largest cities of the Netherlands, votes to join the Dutch Revolt against King Philip II of Spain. King Philip orders sent an army north under command of Don Fadrique, son of the Duke of Alva, to lead an army to conquer the rebelling cities.
- July 9 – The Sea Beggars hang 19 previously imprisoned Roman Catholic priests (the Martyrs of Gorkum) at Brielle.
- July 11 – Humphrey Gilbert leads 1,500 volunteers from England, on an expedition to assist the Sea Beggars.
- July 19 – Wanli Emperor of China ascends the throne at the age of nine; he will rule for 48 years.
- July 29–August 2 – Battle of Molodi: A large Crimean–Ottoman army which invaded Russia is routed.
- August 18 – Huguenot King Henry III of Navarre marries Margaret of Valois, sister of King Charles and daughter of Catherine de' Medici, in a supposed attempt to reconcile Protestants and Catholics in France.
- August 24 – St. Bartholomew's Day massacre: Catholics in Paris murder thousands of Protestants, including Gaspard de Coligny and Petrus Ramus, at the order of King Charles IX, with Catherine de Medici's connivance. Henry of Navarre and the Prince of Condé barely escape the same fate. This brings about the Fourth War of Religion in France.
- September 19 – The Siege of Mons, which started on June 23, ends with the recapture of Valenciennes by the Spanish Army from the Dutch Huguenots in what is now Belgium. Louis of Nassau, the Dutch rebel commander, surrenders to the Duke of Alba.
- September 24 –
  - Tupac Amaru and other Inca Empire nobles are executed in Peru at Cuzco on orders of the Spanish colonial Viceroy, Francisco de Toledo, who then carries out the destruction of the relics of the Incan civilization.
  - The Ottoman Empire begins the deportation of 10 percent of families of the provinces of Anatolia, Rum (Sivas), Karaman and Zülkadriye, mostly craftsmen or peasants, to the newly-conquered island of Cyprus. In exchange for relocating, the transferees are made exempt from taxes for two years.
- September 25 – The coronation of Rudolf as King of Hungary takes place at St. Martin's Cathedral in Pozsony (now Bratislava, Slovakia).

=== October–December ===
- October 2 – Spanish Fury at Mechelen: The mostly Catholic population of the Netherlands city of Mechelen (now in Belgium) surrenders to the Spanish Army and signifies its intention to offer no resistance, singing Catholic psalms of penitence to welcome the Catholic Spaniards. Nevertheless, the Duke of Alba authorizes his troops to conduct three days of slaughter, rape and pillaging.
- October 20 – Eighty Years' War – Relief of Goes: Soldiers of the Spanish Tercios wade across the estuary of the Scheldt, to relieve the siege of Goes in the Spanish Netherlands.
- November 9
  - Siege of Sancerre: Catholic forces of the king lay siege to Sancerre, a Huguenot stronghold in central France. The fortified city holds out for nearly eight months, without bombard artillery. This is one of the last times that slings are used in European warfare.
  - Supernova SN 1572 is first observed in the constellation Cassiopeia, by Cornelius Gemma.
- November 11 – Tycho Brahe also notices Supernova SN 1572. He will use it to challenge the prevailing view that stars do not change. The supernova remnant remains visible through 1574.
- November 14 – Residents of the Belgian city of Zutphen are massacred by the Spanish Army.
- November 22 – All but 60 of the 3,000 residents are massacred by the Spanish Army in the Belgian city of Naarden.
- December 10 – For administrative purposes, the Kingdom of Portugal divides its colony in Brazil into two colonies, with one Governor-General at Rio de Janeiro and another at Bahia. The two colonies will be reunified on April 12, 1578.
- December 11 – The Siege of Haarlem is begun by the Duke of Alva, Spanish Army commander in the Netherlands, and lasts until July 13, 1573.

=== Date unknown ===
- The Neo-Inca State in Vilcabamba, Peru, the last independent remnant of the Inca Empire, is conquered by Spain.
- Girolamo Mercuriale from Forlì (Italy) writes the work De morbis cutaneis ("On the diseases of the skin"), the first scientific tract on dermatology.
- Imaginary numbers are defined by Rafael Bombelli.
- Portugal's national epic Os Lusíadas by Luís de Camões is first published.
- Georg Braun begins publication of his urban atlas, Civitates orbis terrarum, in Cologne.

== Births ==
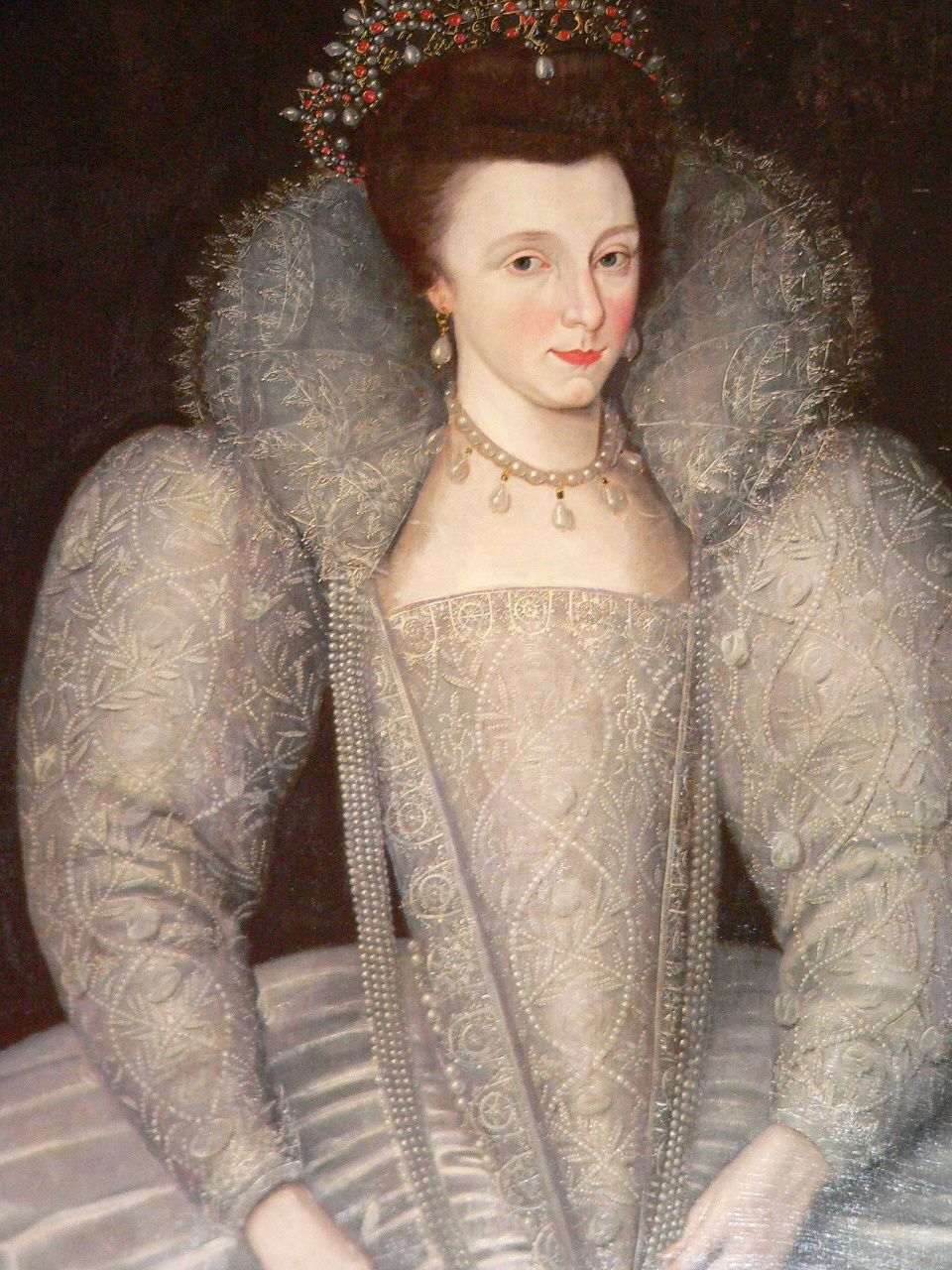
Elizabeth Wriothesley, Countess of Southampton

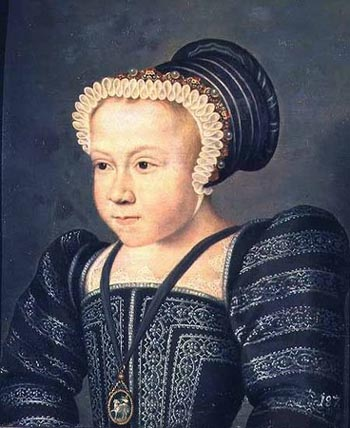
Marie Elisabeth of France

- January 7 – Antoine de Gaudier, French Jesuit writer (d. 1622)
- January 11 – Elizabeth Wriothesley, Countess of Southampton, English countess (d. 1655)
- January 22 – John Donne, English poet and soldier (d. 1631),
- February 1 – Ellen Marsvin, Danish noble, landowner and county administrator (d. 1649)
- February 14 – William Cooke, English politician (d. 1619)
- February 27 – Francis II, Duke of Lorraine (d. 1632)
- February 29 – Edward Cecil, 1st Viscount Wimbledon, English viscount (d. 1638)
- March 4 – István Esterházy, Hungarian noble (d. 1596)
- March 10 – Tommaso Caracciolo, Field Marshal of Spanish forces in the Thirty Years' War (d. 1631)
- March 20 – Otto III, Duke of Brunswick-Harburg (d. 1641)
- April 4 – William Strachey, English writer (d. 1621)
- April 14 – Adam Tanner, Austrian Jesuit professor of mathematics and philosophy (d. 1632)
- May 20 – John Davenant, English Anglican bishop (d. 1641)
- May 25 – Maurice, Landgrave of Hesse-Kassel, German musician (d. 1632)
- June 8 – Honorat de Porchères Laugier, French writer (d. 1653)
- June 10 – Henry II, Count of Reuss-Gera, Lord of Gera, Lobenstein and Oberkranichfeld (1572–1635) (d. 1635)
- June 11 – Ben Jonson, English dramatist (d. 1637)
- July 25 – Theodorus Schrevelius, Dutch Golden Age writer and poet (d. 1649)
- August 6 – Fakhr-al-Din II, Ottoman Emir of Chouf (d. 1635)
- September 11 – Daniyal, Imperial Prince of the Royal House of Timur, Viceroy of Deccan (d. 1604)
- September 27 – Francis van Aarssens, Dutch diplomat (d. 1641)
- September 30 – Denis-Simon de Marquemont, French cardinal and archbishop (d. 1626)
- October 27 – Marie Elisabeth of France, French princess (d. 1578)
- November 4 – William Whitmore, English politician (d. 1648)
- November 7 – Johannes Saeckma, Dutch Golden Age magistrate and judge of Leeuwarden (d. 1636)
- November 8 – John Sigismund, Elector of Brandenburg (d. 1619)
- November 23 – Albret Skeel, State Admiral of Denmark (d. 1639)
- November 25 – Daniel Sennert, German physician, chemist (d. 1637)
- December 1 – Vilem Slavata of Chlum, Czech nobleman (d. 1652)
- December 20 – Edward Russell, 3rd Earl of Bedford, son of Sir Francis Russell (d. 1627)
- December 22 – Juan López de Agurto de la Mata, Spanish Catholic prelate who served as Bishop of Coro (later Bishop of Caracas) (1634–1637) and Bishop of Puerto Rico (1630–1634) (d. 1637)
- December 27 – Johannes Vodnianus Campanus, Czech humanist, composer, pedagogue, poet and dramatist (d. 1622)
- date unknown
  - Johann Bayer, German astronomer (d. 1625)
  - Alfonso de la Cueva, 1st Marquis of Bedmar, Spanish diplomat (d. 1655)
  - Arend Dickmann, Dutch admiral in the Polish Navy (d. 1627)
  - John Floyd, English Jesuit (d. 1649)
  - Regina Basilier, German-Swedish merchant banker (d. 1631)
  - Bartholomew Gosnold, English lawyer and explorer (d. 1607)
  - Nef'i, Turkish poet and satirist (d. 1635)
  - Cyril Lucaris, Greek prelate and theologian (d. 1637)
  - James Mabbe, English scholar and poet (d. 1642)
  - Thomas Tomkins, Welsh composer (d. 1656)
- probable – Giovanni Bernardino Azzolini or Mazzolini or Asoleni, Italian painter (d. c.1645)

== Deaths ==
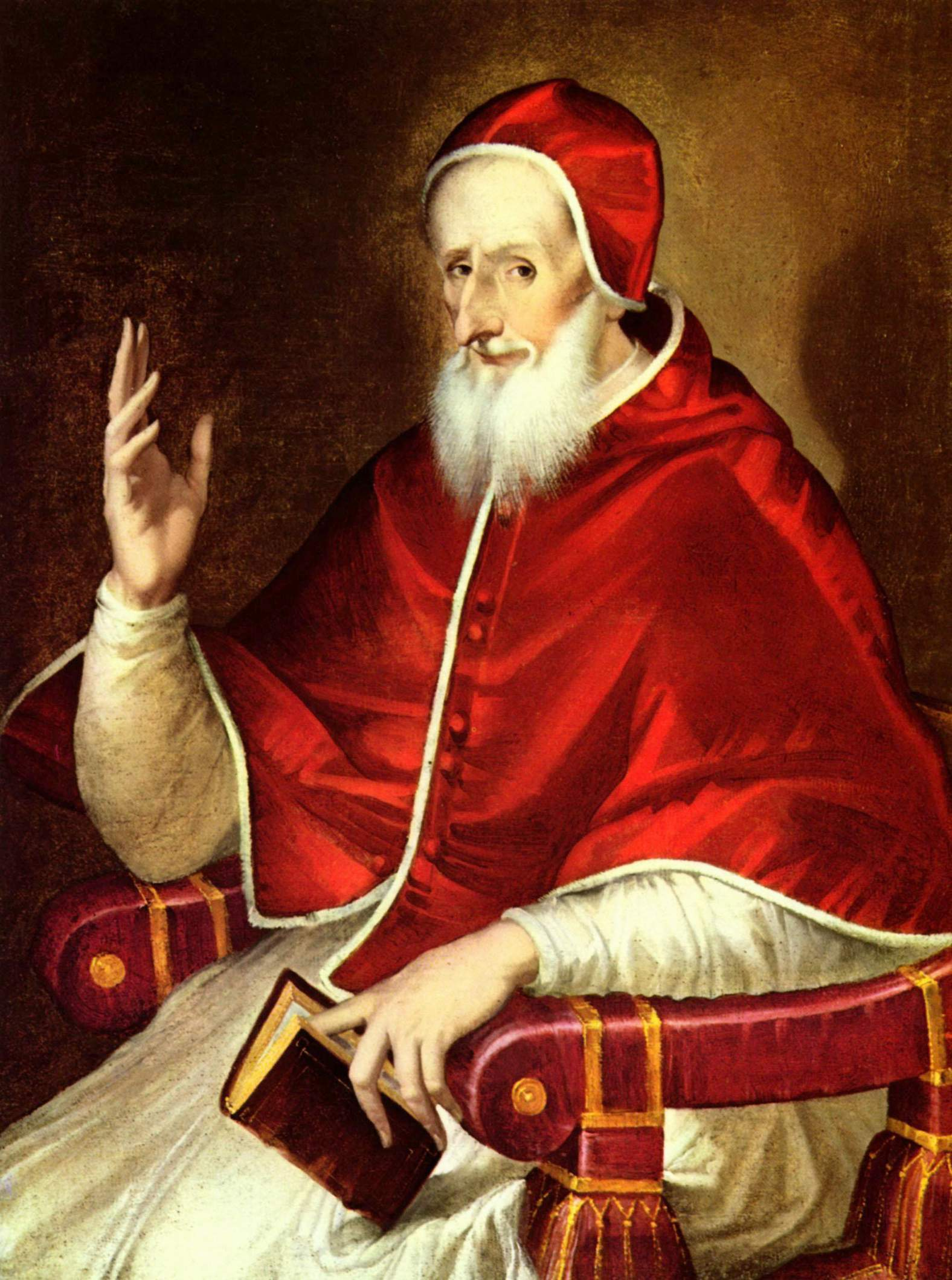
Pope Pius V

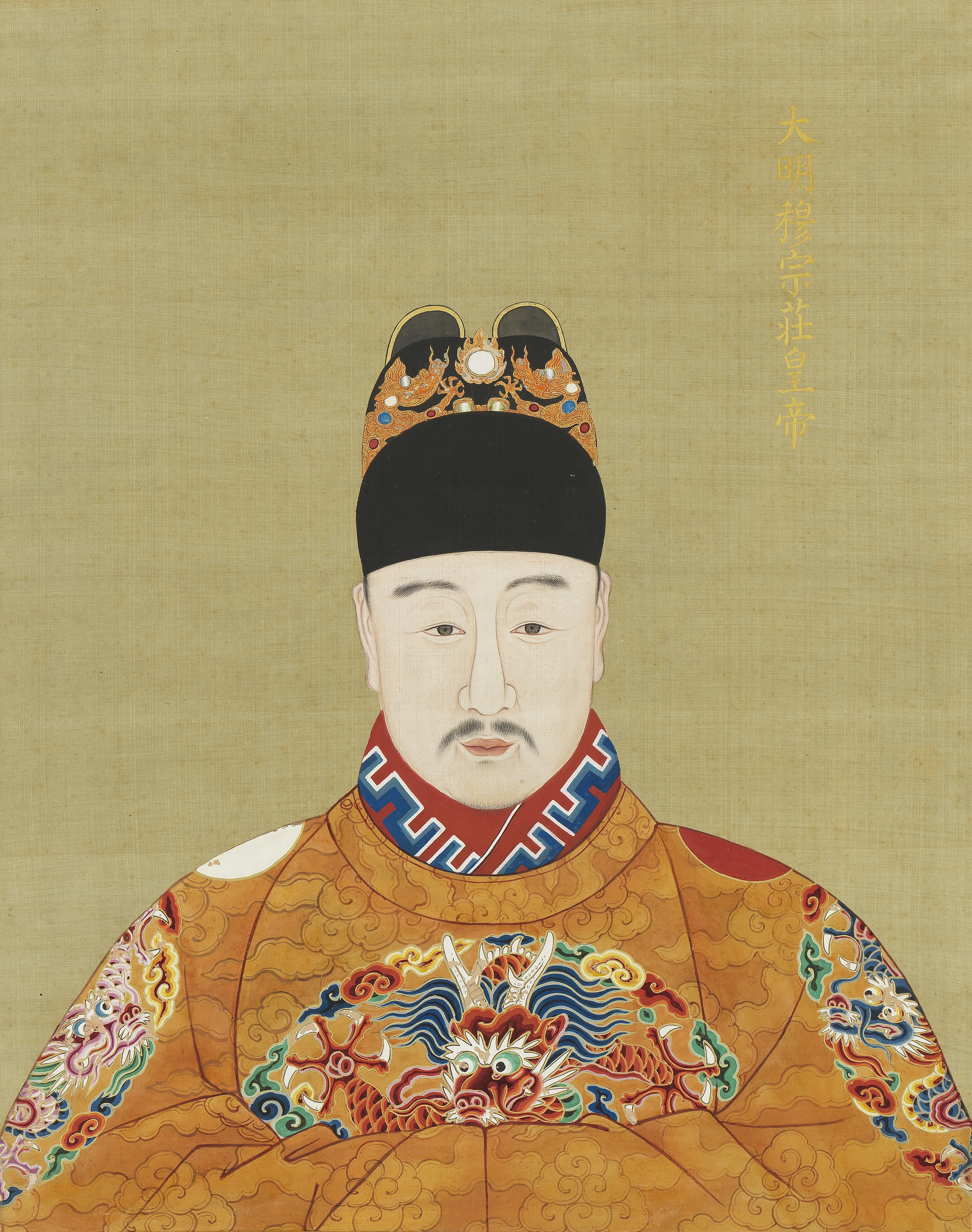
Longqing Emperor of China

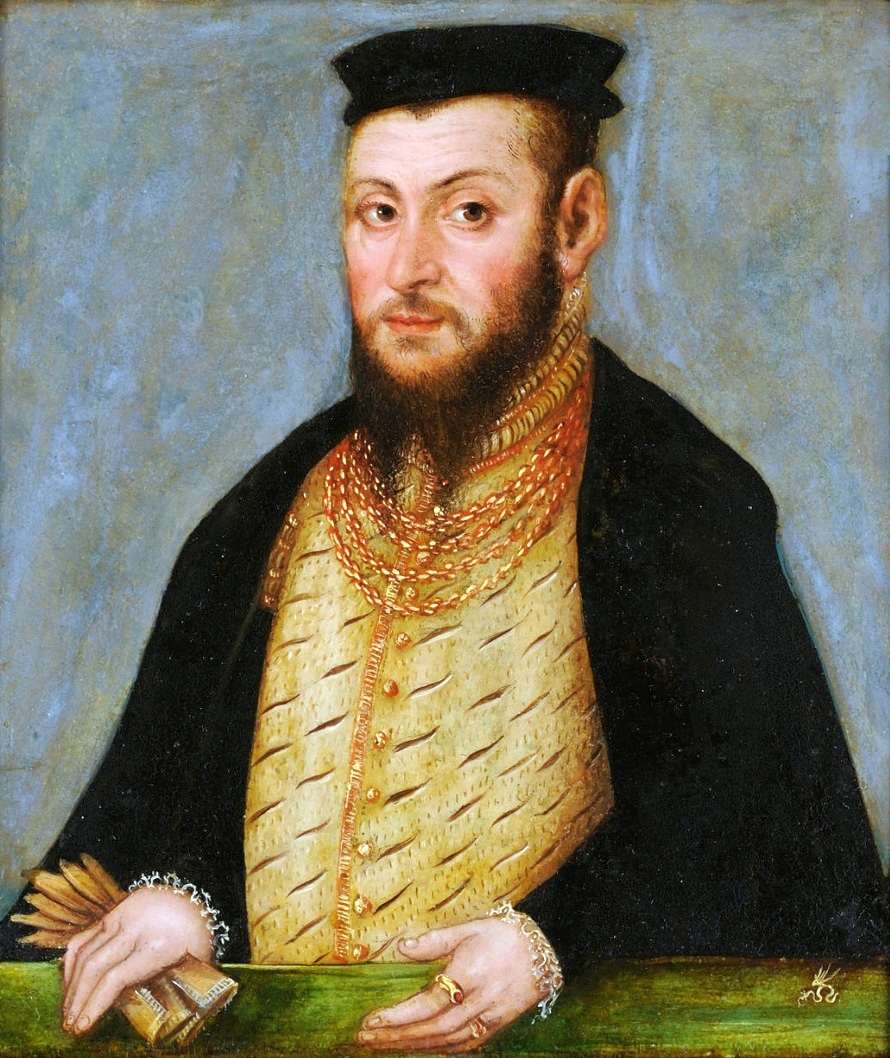
King Sigismund II Augustus of Poland

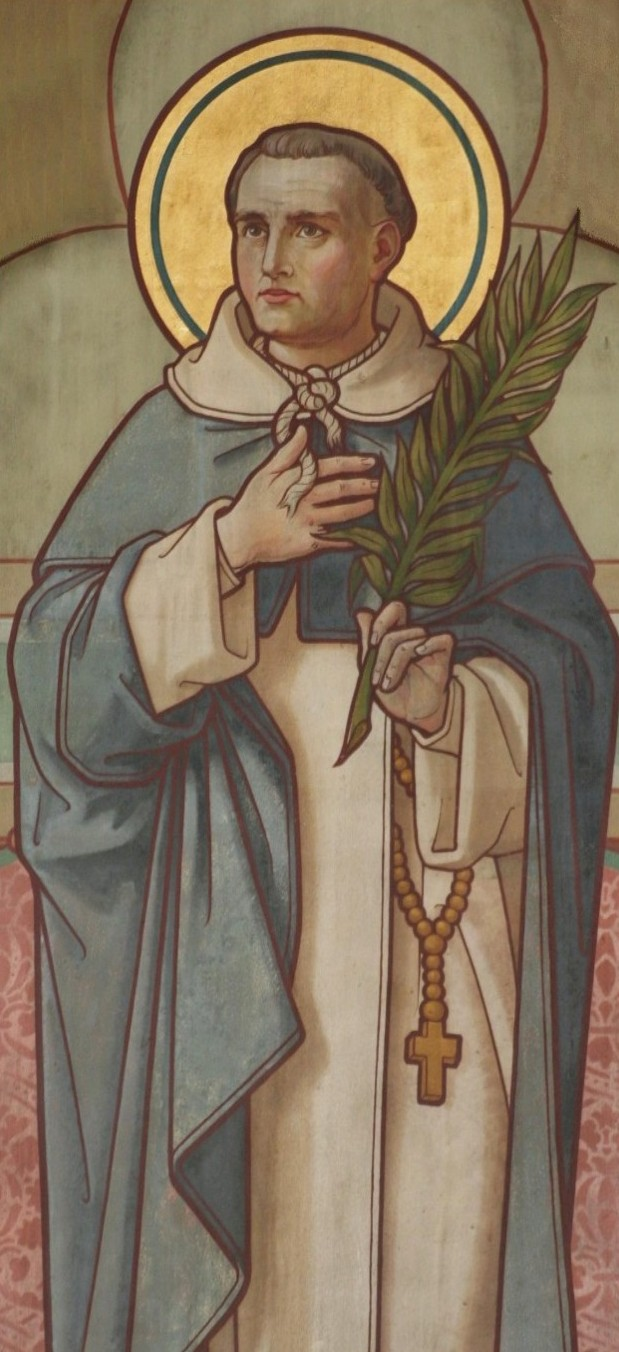
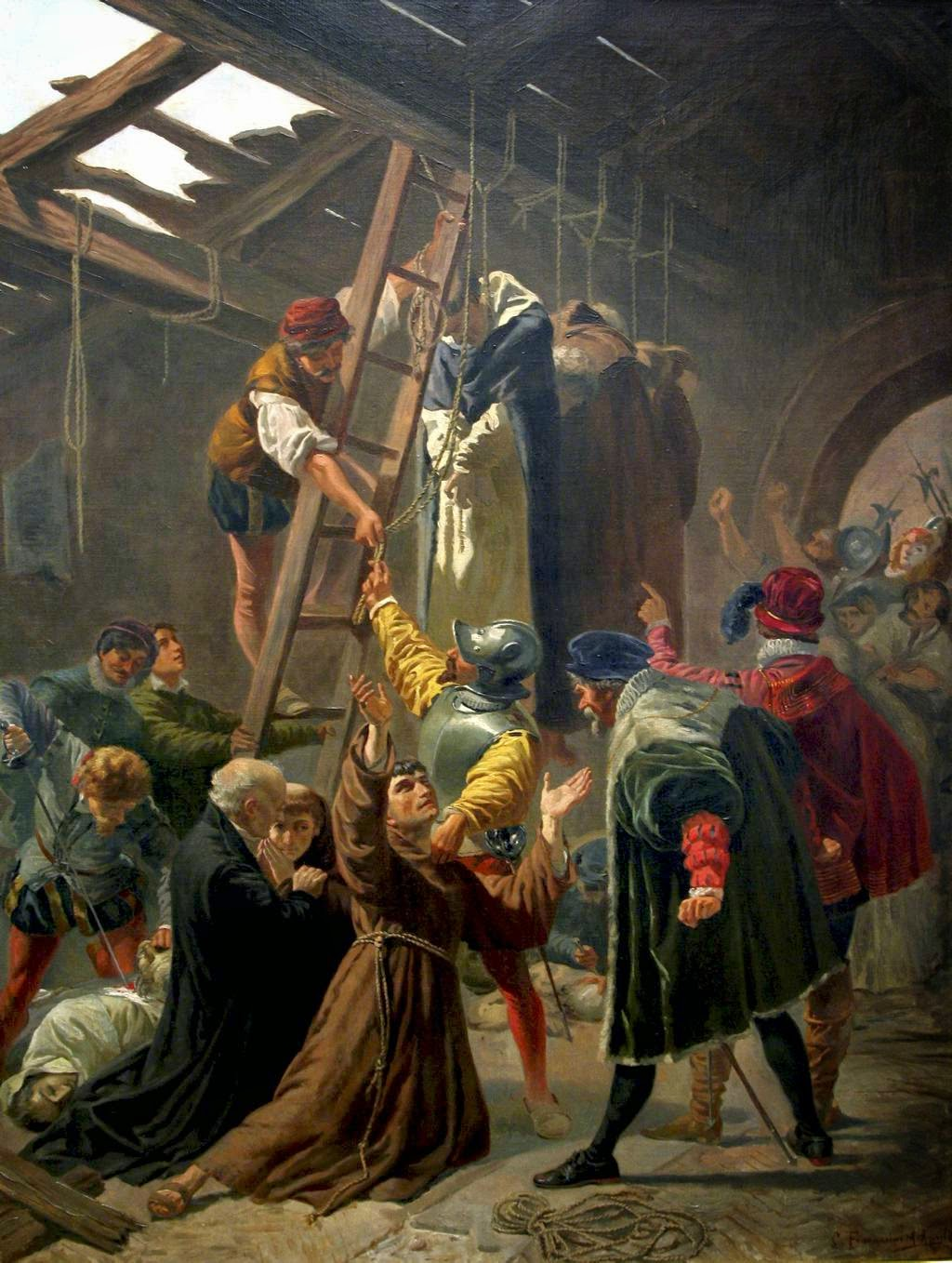
Saint John of Cologne and Martyrs of Gorkum died on July 7, 1572

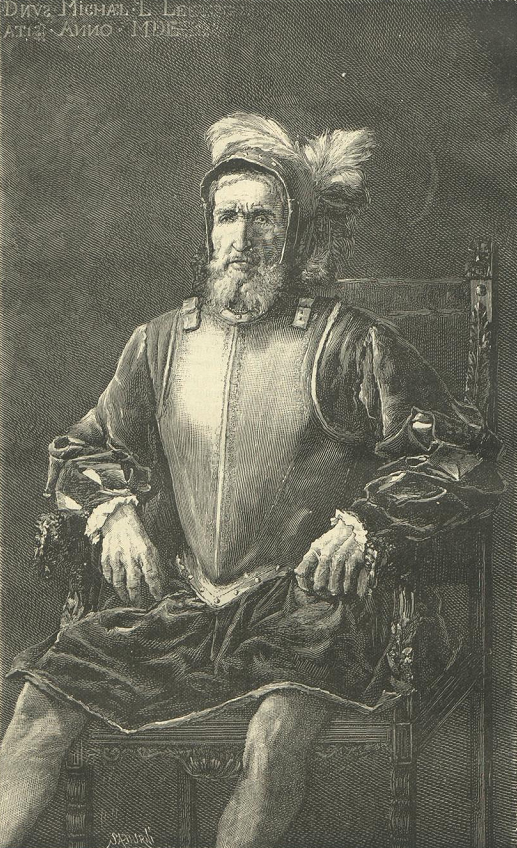
Miguel Lopez de Legazpi

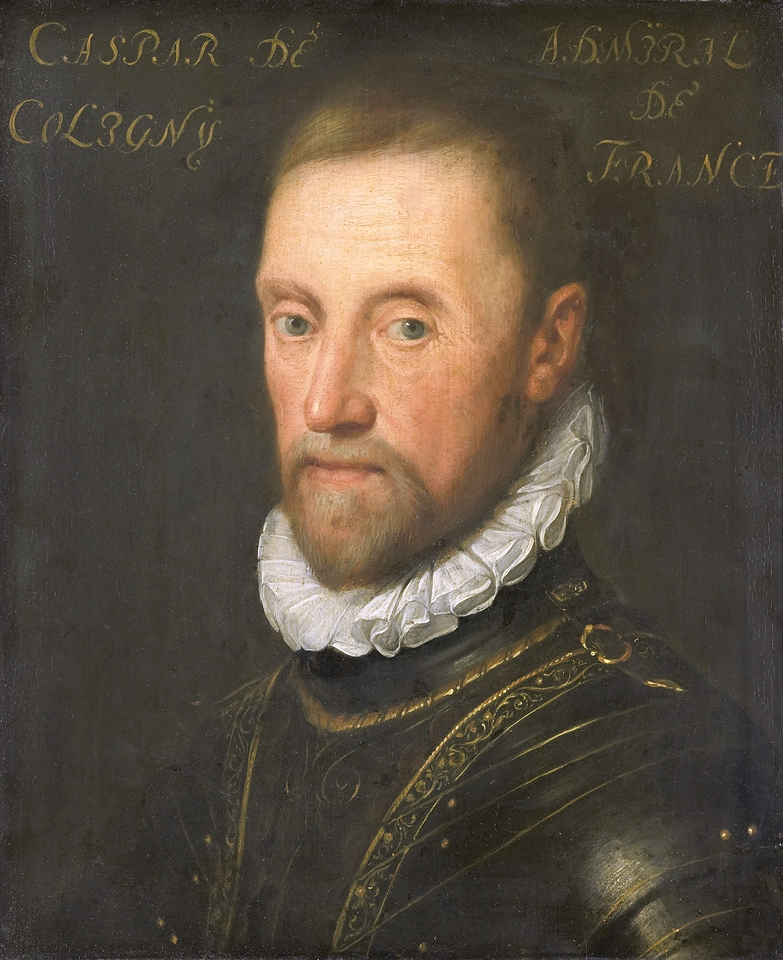
Gaspard de Coligny

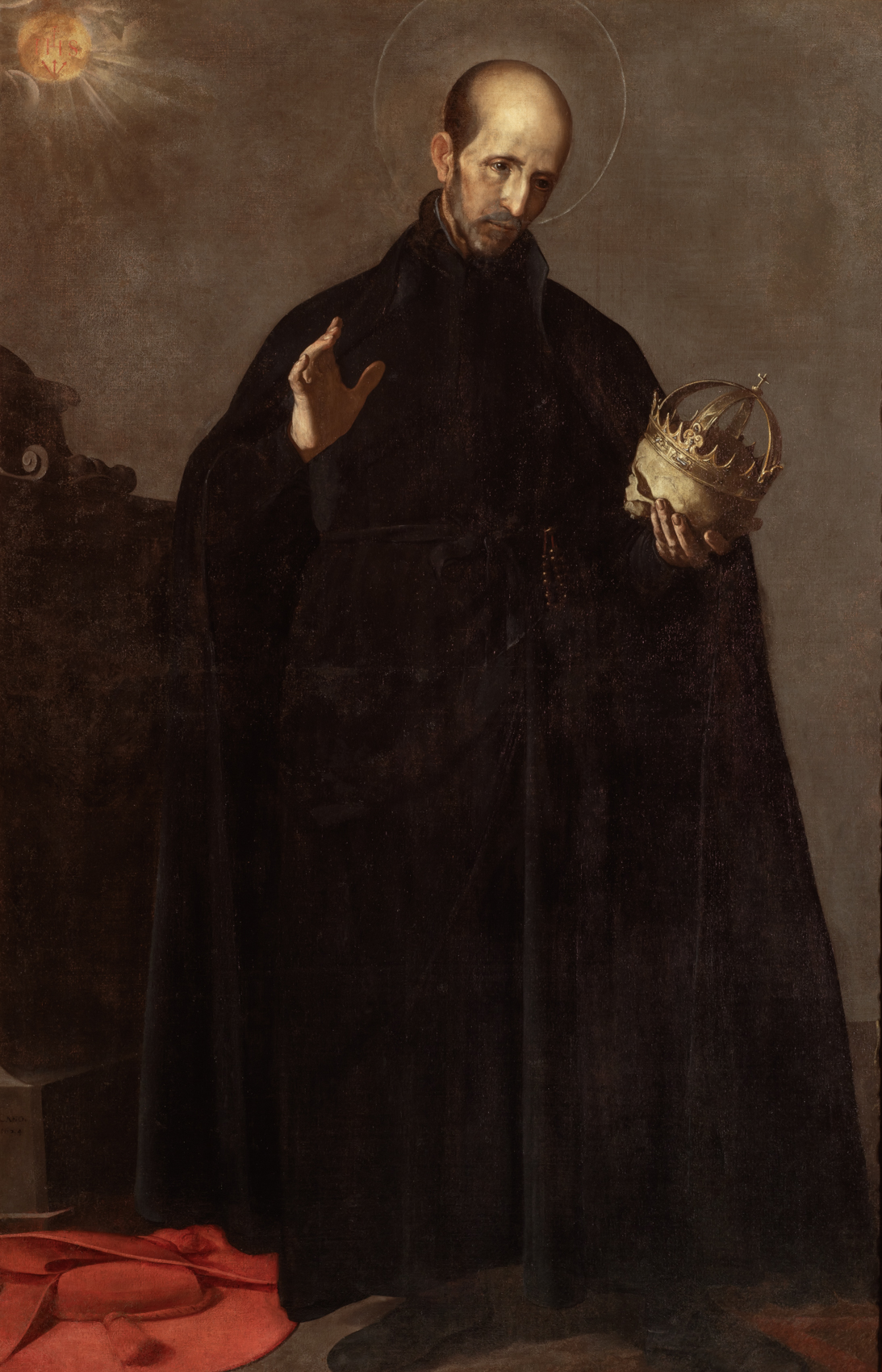
Saint Francis Borgia

- January 22 – Henry VI, Burgrave of Plauen (b. 1536)
- January 26 – Pierre de Monte, French 50th Grandmaster of the Knights Hospitaller (b. 1499)
- February 21 – Cho Sik, Korean Confucian scholar and politician (b. 1501)
- February 23 – Pierre Certon, French composer (b. c. 1510)
- February 26 – Pedro Agustín, Spanish Roman Catholic bishop (b. 1512)
- February 28
  - Aegidius Tschudi, Swiss historian (b. 1505)
  - Catherine of Austria, Queen of Poland (b. 1533)
  - Udai Singh II, King of Mewar (b. 1522)
- March 2 – Mem de Sá, Portuguese Governor-General of Brazil (b. c. 1500)
- March 10 – William Paulet, 1st Marquess of Winchester (b. c. 1483)
- March 27 – Girolamo Maggi, Italian Renaissance man (b. c. 1523)
- April 2 – Elisabeth of Brunswick-Lüneburg, Duchess of Guelders (1518–1538) (b. 1494)
- May 1 – Pope Pius V (b. 1504)
- May 11 – Moses Isserles, Polish Jewish rabbi and Talmudist (b. 1530)
- June 2 – Thomas Howard, 4th Duke of Norfolk (executed) (b. 1536)
- June 9 – Jeanne d'Albret, Queen of Navarre (b. 1528)
- June 28 – Johannes Goropius Becanus, Dutch physician, linguist, and humanist (b. 1519)
- July 5 – Longqing Emperor of China (b. 1537)
- July 7 – King Sigismund II Augustus of Poland (b. 1520)
- July 9
  - John of Cologne, Dutch Franciscan friar, martyr and saint (b. 1510)
  - Martyrs of Gorkum (b. Dutch nationality)
  - Nicholas Pieck, Dutch Franciscan friar, martyr and saint (b. 1534)
- July 25 – Isaac Luria, Palestinian-born Jewish Kabbalist (b. 1534)
- August 20 – Miguel López de Legazpi, Spanish conquistador (b. 1502)
- August 24
  - Gaspard de Coligny, French Protestant leader (b. 1519)
  - Charles de Téligny, French soldier and diplomat (b. 1535)
- August 26 – Pierre de la Ramée, French humanist scholar (b. 1515)
- August – Claude Goudimel, French composer (b. 1510)
- September – Denis Lambin, French classical scholar (b. 1520)
- September 19 – Archduchess Barbara of Austria (b. 1539)
- September 24 – Túpac Amaru, last of the Incas
- September 30 – Francis Borgia, Italian Jesuit priest and saint (b. 1510)
- October 24 – Edward Stanley, 3rd Earl of Derby, English politician (b. 1508)
- October 25 – Cosimo Bartoli, Italian diplomat and writer (b. 1503)
- October 29 – John Erskine, Earl of Mar, regent of Scotland
- November 9 – Al-Mutahhar, Imam of the Zaidi state of Yemen (b. 1503)
- November 12 – Henry of Stolberg, German nobleman (b. 1509)
- November 23 – Agnolo di Cosimo (Bronzino), Italian artist and poet (b. 1503)
- November 24 – John Knox, Scottish religious reformer (b. 1513)
- December 2 – Ippolito II d'Este, Italian cardinal and statesman (b. 1509)
- December 12 – Loredana Marcello, Venetian dogaressa and botanist
- December 22 – François Clouet, French miniaturist (b. c. 1510)
- December 23 – Johann Sylvan, Reformed German theologian (executed; date of birth unknown)
- date unknown
  - Andrzej Frycz Modrzewski, Polish scholar (b. 1503)
  - Francisco de Moraes, Portuguese author and writer (b. 1500)
  - Yasumi Naomasa, Japanese military commander
  - Stanisław Zamoyski, Polish nobleman (b. 1519)
- probable – Christopher Tye, English composer and organist (b. 1505)
