= Isabelle de Monthoiron =

Isabelle de Crissé, Madame de Monthoiron née Chabot (fl. 1578) was a French court official. She was the royal governess of King Charles IX of France for his only legitimate child, Marie Elisabeth of France, from 1572 until 1578.

She was the daughter of Robert Chabot, Seigneur de Clervaux and Antoinette d'Illiers, and married Jacques Turpin de Crissé, écuyer, seigneur de Monthoiron in 1532.

Court offices
Preceded by Claude Catherine de Clermont	Governess of the Children of France; 1572-1578	Succeeded by Françoise de Montglat
