= Elisabeth of Austria, Queen of France =

Queen of France from 1570 to 1574

Elisabeth of Austria
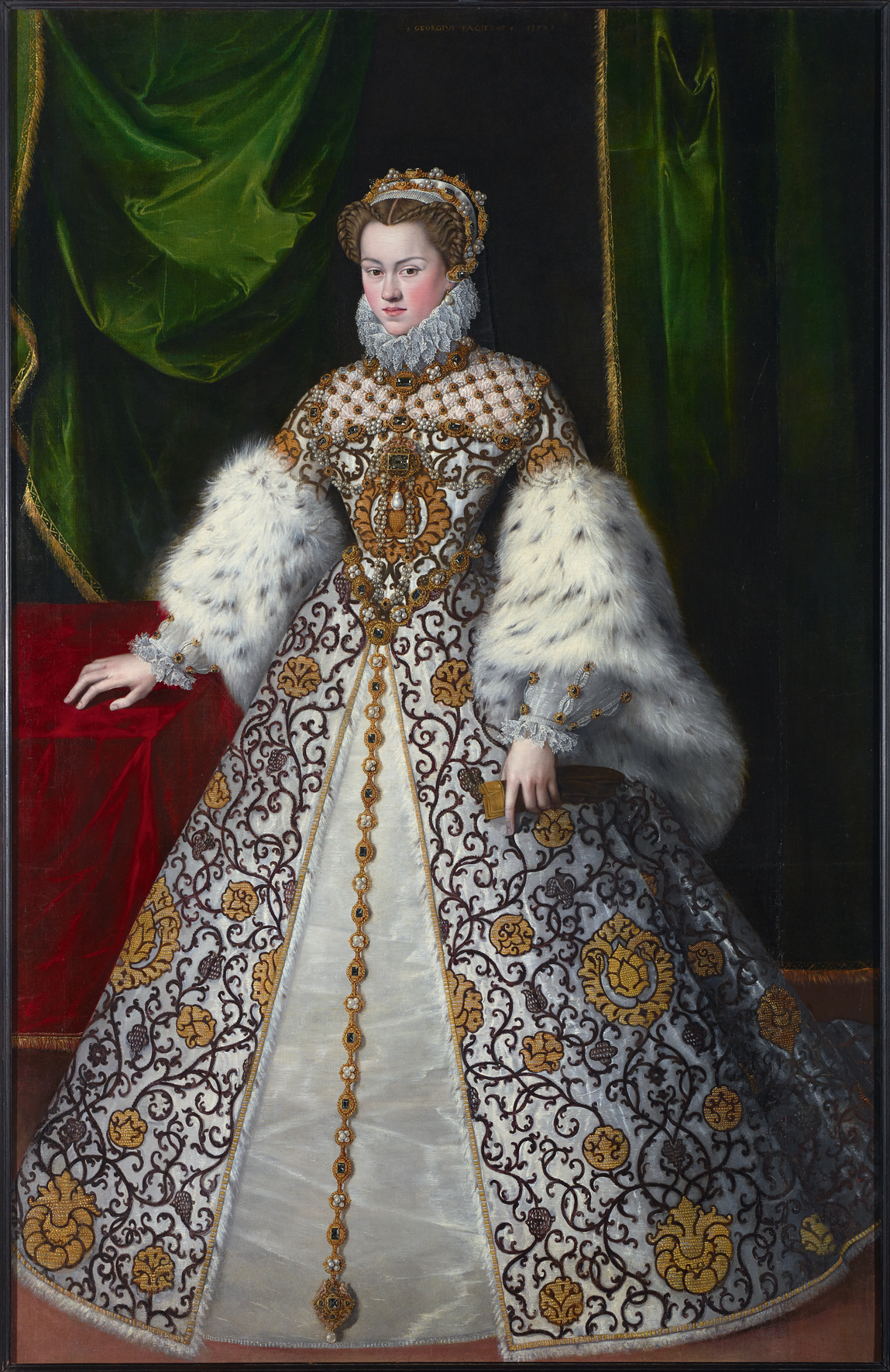
- Portrait of Elisabeth by Jooris van der Straaten, 1573

Queen consort of France
- Tenure: 26 November 1570 – 30 May 1574
- Coronation: 25 March 1571
- Born: 5 July 1554; Vienna, Archduchy of Austria, Holy Roman Empire
- Died: 22 January 1592 (aged 37); Vienna, Archduchy of Austria, Holy Roman Empire
- Burial: St. Stephen's Cathedral
- Spouse: Charles IX of France (m. 1570; died 1574)
- Issue: Marie Elisabeth of France
- House: Habsburg
- Father: Maximilian II, Holy Roman Emperor
- Mother: Maria of Spain

Elisabeth of Austria (5 July 1554 – 22 January 1592) was Queen of France from 1570 to 1574 as the wife of King Charles IX. A member of the House of Habsburg, she was the daughter of Maximilian II, Holy Roman Emperor, and Maria of Spain.

== Early life ==
Elisabeth of Austria was the daughter of Maximilian II, Holy Roman Emperor, and Maria of Spain. During her childhood, she lived with her elder sister Anna and younger brother Matthias in a pavilion in the gardens of the newly built Stallburg, part of the Hofburg Palace complex in Vienna. They enjoyed a privileged and secluded childhood, and were raised in the Roman Catholic religion. Her father Maximilian visited her often and Elisabeth seems to have been his favourite child. She resembled him, not only in appearance but also in character: Elisabeth was considered just as intelligent and charming as her father.

With her pale skin and blonde hair, Elisabeth was considered one of the great beauties of the era. She was also intellectually talented. Elisabeth's brothers were educated by the Flemish writer and diplomat Ogier Ghiselin de Busbecq. The princess soon joined and even overshadowed them in their studies. Her mother Maria personally supervised the religious education of her daughters, and from her early childhood Elisabeth was impressed by her namesake Saint Elisabeth of Hungary and reportedly viewed her as a role model.

Very early in Elisabeth's life, around 1559, a match between Elisabeth and Charles, Duke of Orléans, was suggested. In 1562, the Maréchal de Vieilleville, a member of the French delegation sent to Vienna upon seeing the eight-year-old princess, exclaimed: "Your Majesty, this is the Queen of France!". Although Vieilleville was not entitled to make an offer, Elisabeth's grandfather Ferdinand I, Holy Roman Emperor appeared interested: gifts were exchanged and contacts initiated between the two courts – but no one bothered to teach French to the young princess.

== Queen of France ==
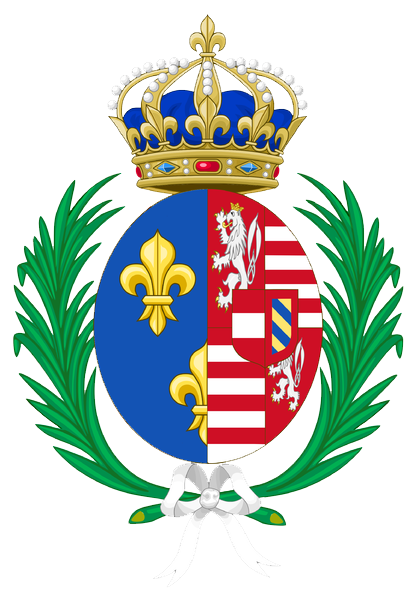
Arms of Elizabeth as queen consort of France

Only in 1569, after the failure of marriage plans with Frederick II of Denmark and Sebastian of Portugal, the French offer was seriously considered. Catherine de' Medici, mother of the now King Charles IX and the power behind the throne, initially preferred Elisabeth's older sister Anna; but the latter was already chosen as the new wife of her uncle King Philip II of Spain. Catherine de' Medici finally agreed to the marriage with the younger Elisabeth, as France absolutely needed a Catholic marriage in order to combat the Protestant party, the Huguenots, as well as to cement an alliance between the House of Habsburg and the French Crown.

Elisabeth was first married by proxy on 22 October 1570 in Speyer Cathedral. Her uncle, Archduke Ferdinand of Further Austria-Tyrol, was standing as proxy for Charles. After long celebrations, she left Austria on 4 November accompanied by high-ranking German dignitaries, including the Archbishop-Elector of Trier. Because of bad weather upon her arrival in France, where constant rain had made roads impassable, the decision was taken to have the official wedding celebrated in the small border town of Mézières in Champagne. Before reaching her destination, Elisabeth stayed in Sedan, where her husband's two younger brothers Henry, Duke of Anjou and François, Duke of Alençon greeted her. Curious about his future wife, Charles IX dressed himself as a soldier and went to Sedan, where he mixed in the crowd of courtiers to observe her incognito while his brother Henry was showing her the architecture of the fortress of Sedan. Charles was reportedly delighted with the sight of her.

King Charles IX of France and Archduchess Elisabeth of Austria were formally married on 26 November 1570 in Mézières; Charles, Cardinal de Bourbon performed the ceremony. The occasion was celebrated with immense pomp and extravagance, despite the dire state of French finances. The new queen's wedding dress was of a cloth of silver sprinkled with pearls, and her tiara was studded with pearls, emeralds, diamonds, sapphires and rubies.

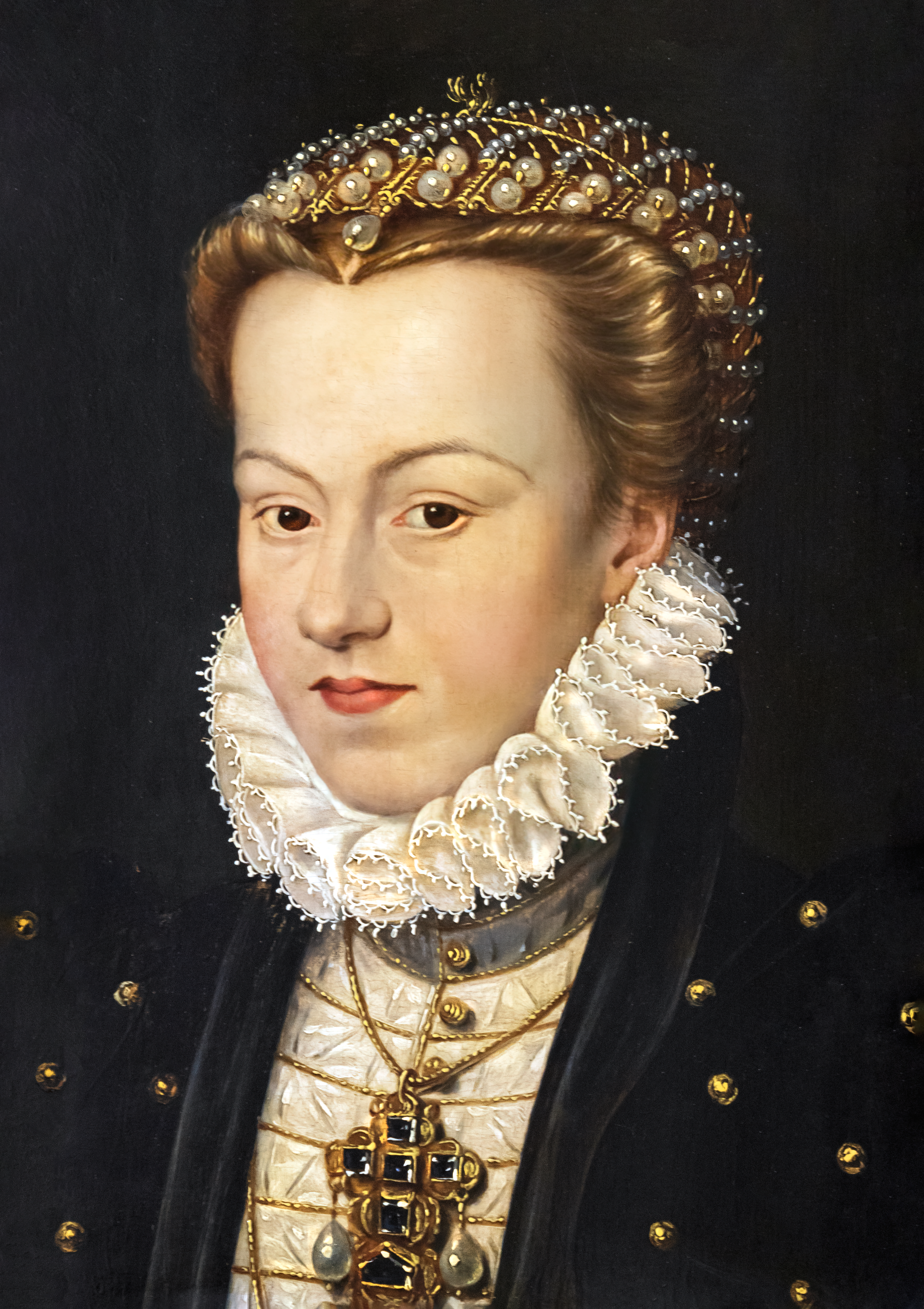
Elisabeth of Austria, c. 1571

Because of the difficult journey and the cold weather, at the beginning of 1571 Elisabeth fell ill. Since the wedding took place far away from Paris, it was only in the spring that the German-French alliance was celebrated once again with magnificent feasts in the capital. On 25 March 1571, Elisabeth was consecrated as Queen of France by the Archbishop of Reims at the Basilica of Saint-Denis. The new queen officially entered Paris four days later, on 29 March. Then, she disappeared from public life.

Elisabeth was so delighted about her husband that she, to general amusement, did not hesitate to kiss him in front of others. However, Charles IX already had a long-term mistress, Marie Touchet, who famously quoted: "The German girl doesn't scare me" (L'Allemande ne me fait pas peur); after a brief infatuation with his teenage bride, Charles IX soon returned to his mistress. However, the royal couple had a warm and supportive relationship. Charles realised that the liberal ways of the French Court might shock Elisabeth and, along with his mother, made an effort to shield her from its excesses. In addition, Catherine de' Medici made sure that her new daughter-in-law was kept out of the affairs of state.

Elisabeth spoke German, Spanish, Latin and Italian with fluency, but she learned French with difficulty; also, she felt lonely in the lively and dissolute French court; yet, one of her few friends was her sister-in-law, Margaret of Valois, who was not known for her virtue. Busbecq, her former tutor who accompanied her to France, was made Lord Chamberlain of her Household, and Madeleine of Savoy was appointed her Première dame d'honneur.

Elisabeth, shocked with the licentious ways of the French court, dedicated her time to embroidery work, reading and especially the practice of charitable and pious works. She continued to hear mass twice a day, and was appalled at how little respect was shown for religion by the supposedly Catholic courtiers. Her one controversial act was to make a point of rejecting the attentions of Protestant courtiers and politicians by refusing the Huguenot leader, Gaspard II de Coligny the permission to kiss her hand when he paid homage to the royal family.

Despite her strong opposition to Protestantism in France, she was horrified when she received news of the Saint Bartholomew's Day Massacre begun on 24 August 1572, and which continued for several days afterwards, when thousands of French Protestants were slaughtered in Paris. According to Brantôme, the following morning, shocked upon learning from someone in her entourage about the massacre, she asked if her husband knew. Told that he not only knew about it, but was its initiator, exclaimed: "Oh, my God! What is this? Who are these counsellors who gave him such advice? My God, I ask of you to forgive him..." Then she asked for her book of hours and began to pray. During those days, Elisabeth was given petitions to speak for the innocent, and she managed to assure a promise to spare the lives of the foreign (especially numerous German) Protestants. Quite advanced in pregnancy at the time, (she was seven months pregnant), she did not publicly rejoice at so many deaths - like other prominent Catholics did.

Two months later, on 27 October 1572, Elisabeth gave birth to her first and only child, a daughter, in the Louvre Palace. The child was named Marie Elisabeth after her grandmother, Empress Maria, and Queen Elizabeth I of England, who were her godmothers.

By the time of her birth, the health of Marie Elisabeth's father was deteriorating rapidly, and after long suffering, in which Elisabeth rendered him silent support and prayed for his recovery, Charles IX died on 30 May 1574; Elisabeth wept "tears so tender, and so secret," according to Brantôme, at his bedside.

After having completed the 40 days mourning period, Elisabeth - now called la Reine blanche (the White Queen), as, by custom, white clothing was worn by the widow of the deceased King of France after the initial mourning period - was compelled by her father to return to Vienna. Shortly before, Emperor Maximilian II made the proposition of a new marriage for her, this time with her deceased husband's brother and successor, King Henry III of France; however, she, as well as Henry, firmly refused. By letters patent dated 21 November 1575, Henry III gave her the County of La Marche as her dower; In addition, she received the title of Duchess of Berry and in 1577 she obtained the duchies of Auvergne and Bourbon in exchange. On 28 August 1575, Elisabeth visited her almost three-year-old daughter in Amboise for the last time, and on 5 December she left Paris.

== Widowhood and death ==
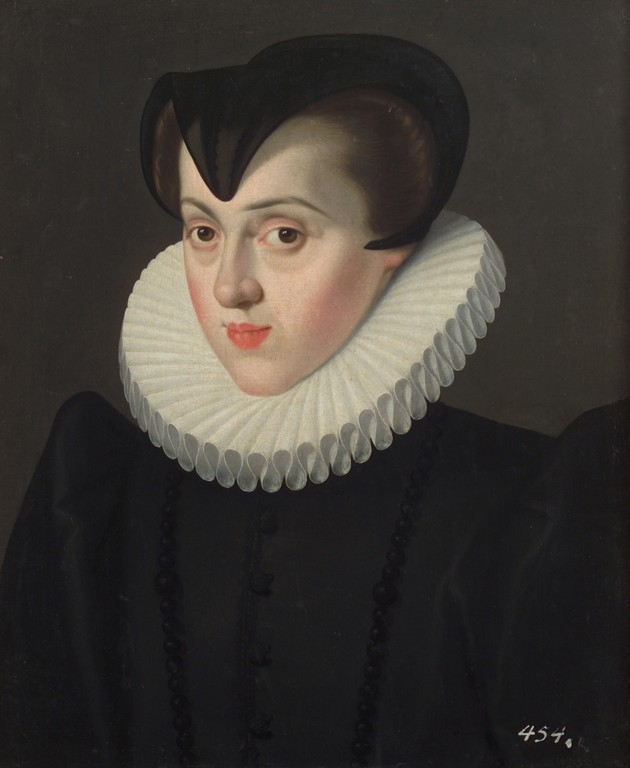
Elisabeth in widow's clothes. Painting by Jakob de Monte, ca. 1580.

Back in Vienna, Elisabeth lived at first in the residence of her childhood, Stallburg. On 12 October 1576, her beloved father Maximilian II died, and her brother Rudolf II succeeded him as Holy Roman Emperor. Her last great tragedy came on 2 April 1578, when her five-and-half-year-old daughter Marie Elisabeth died. When a new proposal of marriage was made to her, this time from King Philip II of Spain after the death of his wife Anna in 1580, she again refused; according to Brantôme, she replied to the offer with the famous phrase: "The Queens of France do not remarry" (Les Reines de France ne se remarient point), once said by Blanche of Navarre, widow of King Philip VI.

In France, where Busbecq managed her properties, Elisabeth built a Jesuit college in Bourges, although she never received the monetary revenues from her domains.

In early 1580, Elisabeth bought some lands near Stallburg and founded the Convent of Poor Clares Mary, Queen of Angels (Klarissinnenkloster Maria, Königin der Engel), also known as the Queen's Monastery (Königinkloster). Elisabeth henceforth devoted her life to following the example of her convent's holy patron in the exercise of piety, relief of the poor, and health care. Even impoverished daughters of the nobility found her support. She also financed the restoration of the All Saints Chapel in Hradčany, Prague, which had been destroyed in a fire in 1541.

Elisabeth acquired several relics for her convent. In 1588, by consent of her brother, Maximilian, as Coadjutor of the Teutonic Order, some of the bones of Saint Elizabeth of Hungary were sent to her from Marburg.

After her departure from France, Elisabeth maintained a regular correspondence with her sister-in-law Queen Margaret of Navarre, and when the latter was ostracised from the rest of the royal family, she made half of the revenues she received from France available to her. Brantôme relates that on one occasion, Elisabeth sent to Margaret two books written by her (now lost): a devotional work (Sur la parole de Dieu) and a historical work (Sur les événements considérables qui arrivèrent en France de son temps).

Elisabeth died on 22 January 1592 victim of pleurisy, and was buried under a simple marble slab in the church of her convent. About her death, Brantôme wrote:

When she died, the Empress [...] (her mother) said [...] "El mejor de nosotros es muerto" (The best of us is dead).

In the course of the Josephinist reforms, the Queen's monastery was closed in 1782 in order to create the Lutheran City Church. The building became later Palais von Fries (now Palais Pallavicini). By order of Emperor Joseph II, Elisabeth's remains were transferred to one of the crypts beneath St. Stephen's Cathedral, Vienna.

In her will, Elizabeth donated money not only to the poor and sick, but also included funds for prayers for her late husband in the convent's church. The Spanish, German, French, Italian, and Latin books from her library, a number of works of the Jesuit preacher Georg Scherer, a book of prophecies of the French astrologer Nostradamus written in 1571, and the tragedy of Antigone of the ancient Greek poet Sophocles were left to her brother, Emperor Rudolf II. Her wedding ring was given to another brother Ernest.

== Sources ==
- Brainne, C, Debarbouiller, J., Lapierre, C. F., Femmes célèbres de l'Orléanais in Les Hommes illustres de l'Orléanais, Imprimerie d'Alex, Jacob, Orléans, 1852, Tome 2, p. 335.
- Brantôme, Isabelle d'Autriche, femme de Charles IX, Roi de France, in Collection universelle des Mémoires particuliers, relatifs à l'Histoire de France, Tome LXIV, 16e siècle, Londres, Paris, 1790.
- Hamann, Brigitte, Elisabeth, [in:] Die Habsburger: Ein biographisches Lexikon, Wirtschaftsverlag Ueberreuter; Auflage: 2, 1988, p. 87. ISBN 978-3800032471
- Nadaud, Joseph (Abbé), Nobiliaire du diocèse et de la généralité de Limoges, Société historique et archéologique du Limousin, Limoges, 1878, vol. III, p. 182. BnF
- Patrouch, Joseph F. (1999). "The Archduchess Elizabeth: Where Spain and Austria Met". In Hewitt, Cameron; Kent, Conrad; Wolber, Thomas (eds.). The Lion and the Eagle: German-Spanish Relations Over the Centuries: An Interdisciplinary Approach. Berghahn Books. pp. 77–90. ISBN 9781789205770.
- Patrouch, Joseph F. (2000). "Elisabeth of Habsburg (1554–1592)". In Commire, Anne (ed.). Women in World History'. Vol. 5: Ead-Fur. Yorkin Publications. pp. 129–133. ISBN 0-7876-4064-6.
- Patrouch, Joseph F. (2010). Queen's Apprentice: Archduchess Elizabeth, Empress María, the Habsburgs, and the Holy Roman Empire, 1554-1569. Brill. ISBN 9789004180307.
- Treffer, Gerd, Elisabeth von Österreich, [In:] Die Französischen Königinnen, Pustet, Regensburg (1996), p. 260. ISBN 978-3791715308.
- Wurzbach, Constantin von, Habsburg, Elisabeth von Oesterreich (Königin von Frankreich). Nr. 71. [In:] Biographisches Lexikon des Kaiserthums Oesterreich, vol. VI, Publisher L. C. Zamarski, Vienna 1856–1891, p. 169.

Elisabeth of Austria, Queen of France House of Habsburg Born: 5 July 1554 Died: 22 January 1592
French royalty
Vacant Title last held by Mary Stuart	Queen consort of France; 26 November 1570 – 30 May 1574	Vacant Title next held by Louise of Lorraine
French nobility
Vacant Title last held by Margaret of Valois	Duchess of Berry; 1575–1577	Succeeded by Francis, Duke of Anjou
