= Françoise de Montglat =

French governess

Françoise de Montglat née de Longuejoue (d. 1633) was a French court official. She was the royal governess of King Louis XIII and his siblings.

== Life ==
Françoise de Montglat was the daughter of Thibaut de Longuejoue and Madeleine Briçonnet. She married Robert de Harlay (1550-1607), Baron de Montglat and royal chamberlain, in 1579.

She was appointed royal governess to the children of King Henry IV of France in 1601. She was given the responsibility for the king's children with Queen Maria of Medici, as well as for the children of the king with his mistresses, who were raised together. She was referred to as "Mamangat" by her royal charges, who corresponded with her as adults.

Her daughter Jeanne de Harlay (later Jeanne de Saint George) became a playmate and sub-governess of the royal children, who called her "Mamie", and was later lady-in-waiting and correspondent to Henrietta Maria and, finally, appointed governess to Anne Marie Louise d'Orléans, Duchess of Montpensier.

Her letters are preserved.

Court offices
Preceded by Isabelle de Crissé	Governess of the Children of France	Succeeded by Françoise de Lansac
