= Jeanne de Harlay =

French court official and letter writer

Jeanne de Harlay also known as Madame St. George (1580 - 28 February 1643) was a French court official and letter writer.

She was the daughter of Robert de Harlay de Sancy, Baron de Montglat, and the French royal governess Françoise de Montglat. On 13 October 1598, she married Hardouin de Clermont (d. 1633), seigneur de Saint Georges. She became the mother of François de Clermont, marquis de Montglat.

Her mother was the governess of the royal children, and she herself was appointed sub-governess of the royal children, who called her "Mamie". When the children became adults she was promoted Dame d'honneur, principal lady-in-waiting, to the royal princesses.

When the youngest of the princesses, Henrietta Maria of France, married Charles I of England, she accompanied her to England with her spouse as the principal lady-in-waiting. In England she was known as Madame St. George and became the subject of discord between the queen and king. The king accused her of setting up the queen against him whenever he made her displeased and blamed her and the rest of the French entourage for their initial difficulties in their relationship. In 1626, the French entourage of queen Henrietta Maria was dismissed by the king and sent back to France.

Upon her return to France, she was appointed governess to Anne Marie Louise d'Orléans, Duchess of Montpensier.

Her letters have been preserved.
