= Pierre Bourguignon (painter) =

French Baroque painter (1630–1698)

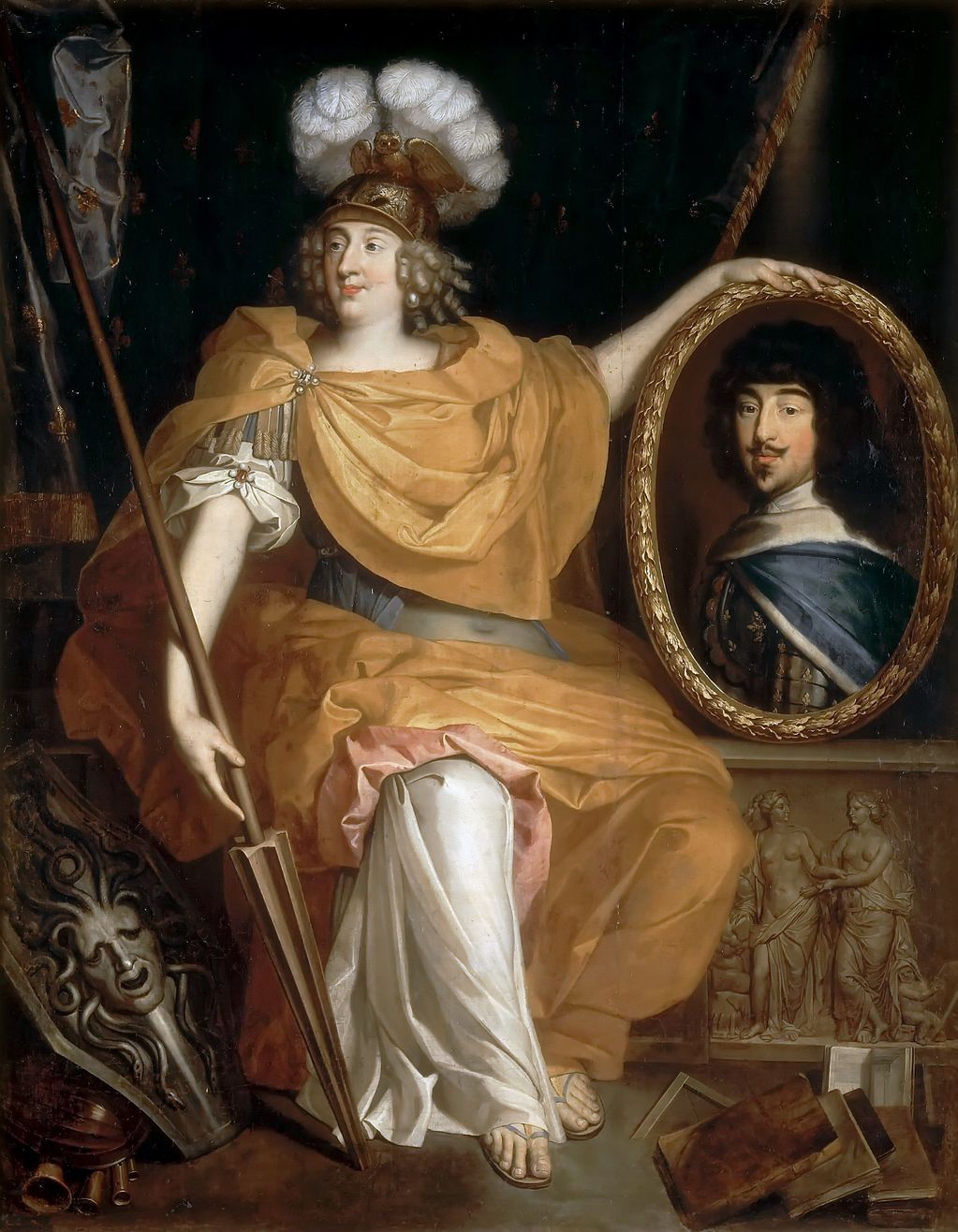
- Anne Marie Louise d'Orléans by Pierre Bourguignon holding a portrait of her father Gaston, Duke of Orléans, ca. 1672
- Born: 1630; Namur, Spanish Netherlands
- Died: 1698 (aged 67–68); London, England
- Occupation: Painter

Pierre Bourguignon (French pronunciation: [pjɛʁ buʁɡiɲɔ̃]; 1630–1698) was a Baroque painter.

Bourguignon was born in Namur, Spanish Netherlands. He worked in Paris during the years 1671–1685 but moved north after the Edict of Nantes to the Hague where he became a member of the Confrerie Pictura in 1687.

Bourguignon died in London.
