= Honorat de Porchères Laugier =

French poet

Honorat de Porchères Laugier (8 June 1572 – 26 October 1653) was a French poet. He was born in Forcalquier. He is most notable for his sonnet on the beautiful eyes of Gabrielle d'Estrées and for being a founding member of the Académie française. He is sometimes called Honoré de Porchères Laugier.
