= Marie Elisabeth of France =

French princess (1572–1578)

Marie Elisabeth
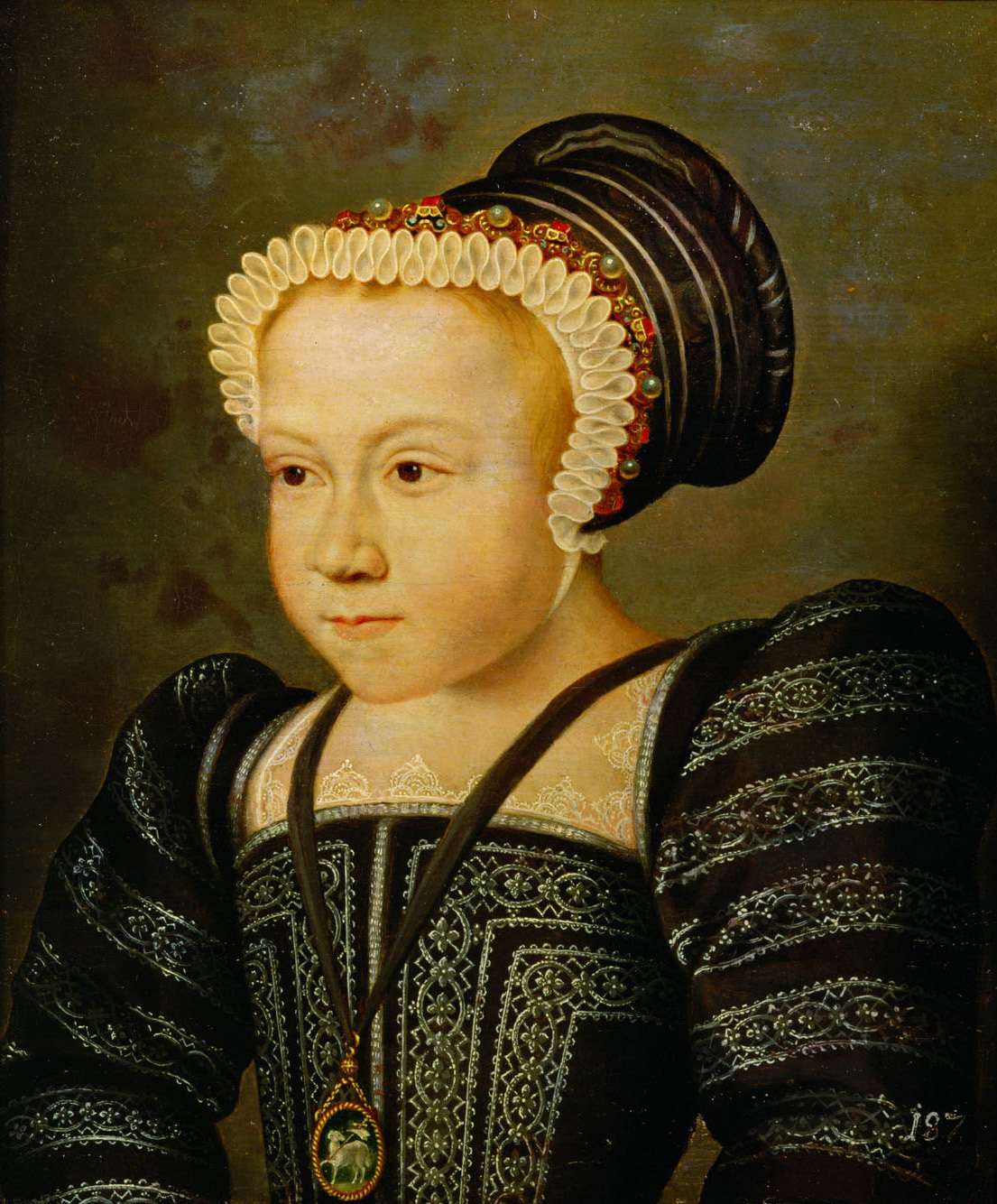
- Portrait by an unidentified painter, c. 1577–78
- Born: 27 October 1572; Louvre Palace, Paris, France
- Died: 2 April 1578 (aged 5); Hôtel d’Anjou, Paris, France
- House: Valois-Angoulême
- Father: Charles IX of France
- Mother: Elisabeth of Austria

Marie Elisabeth of France (27 October 1572 – 2 April 1578) was a French princess and member of the House of Valois. She was the only child of King Charles IX of France and Elisabeth of Austria.

Marie Elisabeth's maternal grandparents were Maximilian II, Holy Roman Emperor, and Maria of Spain, and her paternal grandparents were Henry II of France and Catherine de' Medici. Born at the Louvre Palace in Paris, she was only two years old when her father died and three when her mother relocated to her native Vienna, never to return. Marie Elisabeth was described in contemporary writings as unusually intelligent, although she was a sickly child. She died in 1578 at the age of five and buried in the Basilica of Saint-Denis, although her tomb was destroyed during the French Revolution.

== Life ==
Born at the Louvre Palace in Paris, France, Marie Elisabeth was loved by her parents despite their inevitable disappointment that she was not the male heir for which they hoped. She was baptised almost four months later, on 2 February 1573 in Saint-Germain l'Auxerrois. Despite the religious and political controversy stemming from the Saint Bartholomew's Day Massacre (which had occurred only two months before her birth), one of her godmothers was the Protestant queen Elizabeth I of England, who sent William Somerset, 3rd Earl of Worcester as her proxy for the ceremony. Her other godmother and namesake was her maternal grandmother, the Holy Roman Empress, and her godfather was Emmanuel Philibert, Duke of Savoy. She was raised under the supervision of her governess, Isabelle de Crissé.

When Marie Elisabeth was less than two years old her father, King Charles IX, died and her uncle became Henry III of France. Hardly a year later, her mother returned to Vienna after Maximilian II repaid her dowry, while Marie Elisabeth, as a Daughter of France, remained behind. She was less than three years old at the time. Elisabeth and Marie said their farewells at the Château d'Amboise on 28 August 1575, never to see each other again.

Pierre de Bourdeille, seigneur de Brantôme, whose aunt, Madame Crissé, was Marie Elisabeth's governess, describes the princess in his writings. He reports that she was pretty but also unusually intelligent and eager to learn, at times seeming more like an adult than a child. She memorised the names of her ancestors, both Valois and Habsburg, and would proudly tell everyone that she belonged to both of those great royal houses.

Marie Elisabeth resided firstly in Amboise and Blois, but later she was moved to Paris. Apparently of frail health, she died on 2 April 1578 at the Hôtel d’Anjou, aged only five and a half years. She was deeply mourned by the court, despite her youth, for her kindness, grace and softness. Eight days later on 10 April, she was buried in a vault of the Basilica of Saint-Denis, next to her father.

On 17 October 1793 Marie Elisabeth's tomb was desecrated by the revolutionaries during the French Revolution, and her remains were thrown into a common grave. In 1817 she was reinterred in the Basilica's Ossuary.

== Additional bibliography ==
- Jacqueline Boucher, Deux épouses et reines à la fin du XVIe siècle : Louise de Lorraine et Marguerite de France, Saint-Étienne, Publications of the University of Saint-Étienne, 1995, p. 60. In 1580, Queen Margaret of Navarre sold the Hôtel to her Chancellor Guy Du Faur, Seigneur de Pibrac.
- Oraison funebre de treshaute et vertueuse princesse Marie Isabeau de France fille de Treshaut et Treschrestien Roy Charles IX, amateur de toute vertu, et protecteur de la Foy. Pronounced in Notre-Dame of Paris on 11 April 1578, by Arnaud Sorbia, Royal Chaplain. This prayer was published in Lyon in 1578 by Rigaud Benoit, and is preceded by a dedicatory letter to Margaret de Valois, dated 16 April 1578. See Jacqueline Vons (éd.),Dédicace à l’Oraison funèbre et Tombeau de Marie-Élisabeth de France (1572-1578). Documents posted on Cour de France.fr on 3 May 2010 as part of the research project "La médecine à la cour de France". (Cour-de-france.fr: Article 1417).
- Orieux, Jean (2007). Caterina de' Medici. Un'italiana sul trono di Francia. Milano: Arnoldo Mondadori. ISBN 978-88-04-30464-7.
