= Charles IX of France =

King of France from 1560 to 1574

Charles IX
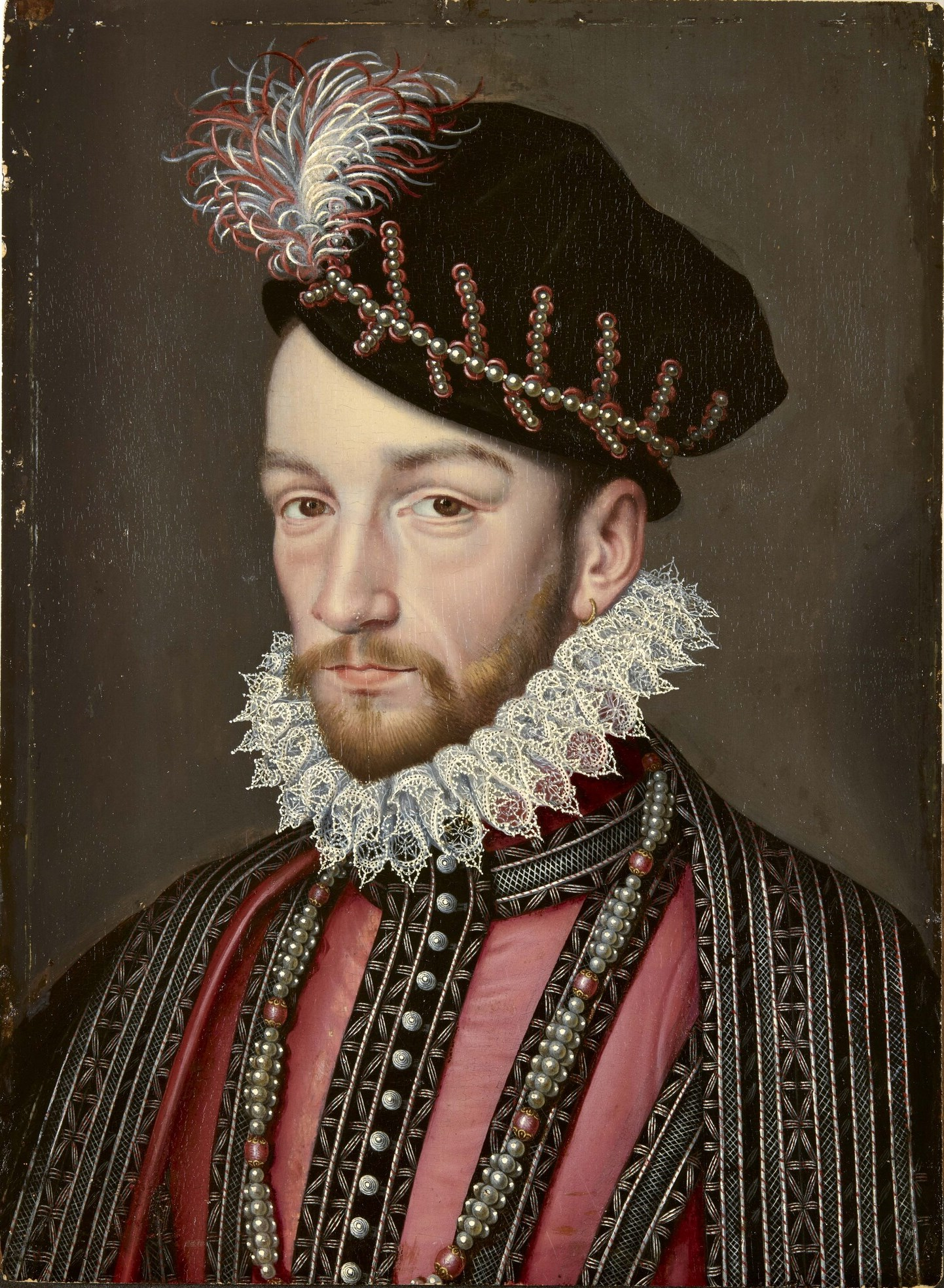
- Portrait after François Clouet, c. 1572

King of France
- Reign: 5 December 1560 – 30 May 1574
- Coronation: 15 May 1561
- Predecessor: Francis II
- Successor: Henry III
- Regent: Catherine de' Medici (1560–1563)
- Born: Charles, Duke of Angoulême; 27 June 1550; Saint-Germain-en-Laye, France
- Died: 30 May 1574 (aged 23); Vincennes, France
- Burial: 13 July 1574; Basilica of St Denis, France
- Spouse: Elisabeth of Austria (m. 1570)
- Issue: Marie Elisabeth of France; Charles, Duke of Angoulême (ill.)
Names
- Charles Maximilien
- House: Valois-Angoulême
- Father: Henry II of France
- Mother: Catherine de' Medici
- Religion: Catholicism

Charles IX (Charles Maximilien; 27 June 1550 – 30 May 1574) was King of France from 1560 until his death in 1574. He ascended the French throne upon the death of his brother Francis II in 1560, and as such was the penultimate monarch of the House of Valois.

Charles's reign saw the culmination of decades of tension between Protestants and Catholics. Civil and religious war broke out between the two parties after the massacre of Vassy in 1562. In 1572, following several unsuccessful attempts at brokering peace, Charles arranged the marriage of his sister Margaret to Henry III of Navarre, a major Protestant nobleman in the line of succession to the French throne, in a last desperate bid to reconcile his people. Facing popular hostility against this policy of appeasement and at the instigation of his mother Catherine de' Medici, Charles oversaw the massacre of numerous Huguenot leaders who gathered in Paris for the royal wedding, though his direct involvement is still debated. This event, known as the St. Bartholomew's Day massacre, was a significant blow to the Huguenot movement, and religious civil warfare soon began anew. Charles sought to take advantage of the disarray of the Huguenots by ordering the siege of La Rochelle, but was unable to take the Protestant stronghold.

Many of Charles's decisions were influenced by his mother, firmly committed to the Roman Catholic cause, who initially supported a policy of relative religious tolerance. After the St. Bartholomew's Day Massacre in 1572, he began to support the persecution of Huguenots. However, the incident haunted Charles for the rest of his life, and historians suspect that it caused his physical and mental health to deteriorate over the next two years. Charles died of tuberculosis in 1574 without legitimate male issue, and was succeeded by his brother Henry III, whose own death in 1589 without issue allowed for the accession of Henry of Navarre to the French throne as Henry IV, establishing the House of Bourbon as the new French royal dynasty.

== Biography ==
=== Birth and childhood ===
Portrait of Charles IX shortly after acceding to the throne, by François Clouet

Charles Maximilien of France, third son of King Henry II of France and Catherine de' Medici, was born on 27 June 1550 at the Château de Saint-Germain-en-Laye. He was the fifth of ten children born to the royal couple. Styled since birth as Duke of Angoulême, he was created Duke of Orléans after the death of his elder brother Louis, his parents' second son, who had died in infancy on 24 October 1550. The royal children were raised under the supervision of the governor and governess of the royal children, Claude d'Urfé and Françoise d'Humières, under the orders of Diane de Poitiers.

On 14 May 1564, Charles was presented the Order of the Garter by Henry Carey.

=== Accession ===
Charles's father died in 1559, and was succeeded by Charles's elder brother, King Francis II. Francis II died in 1560. The ten-year-old Charles was immediately proclaimed king on 5 December 1560, and the Privy Council appointed his mother, Catherine de' Medici, as governor of France (gouvernante de France), with sweeping powers, at first acting as regent for her young son. On 15 May 1561, Charles was consecrated in the cathedral at Reims. Antoine of Bourbon, himself in line to the French throne and husband to Queen Jeanne III of Navarre, was appointed Lieutenant-General of France.

=== First war of religion ===
==== Relations with the Huguenots ====
In 1560, a group of Huguenot nobles at Amboise had planned to try to abduct King Francis II and arrest the Catholic leaders Francis, Duke of Guise, and his brother Charles, Cardinal of Lorraine. The plot was discovered ahead of time, and the Guises were prepared, executing hundreds of Huguenots. This was followed by cases of Protestant iconoclasm and Catholic reprisals.

The regent Catherine tried to foster reconciliation at the Colloquy at Poissy and, after that failed, made several concessions to the Huguenots in the Edict of Saint-Germain in January 1562. Nonetheless, the Massacre of Vassy, perpetrated on 1 March 1562, when the Duke of Guise and his troops attacked and killed or wounded over 100 Huguenot worshipers and citizens, brought France spiralling towards civil war.

The massacre lit the fuse that sparked the French Wars of Religion. Louis of Bourbon, Prince of Condé, brother of the Lieutenant-General and the suspected architect of the Amboise conspiracy, had already prepared for war and, taking Wassy as the pretext, assumed the role of a protector of Protestantism and began to seize and garrison strategic towns along the Loire Valley. In response, the monarchy revoked the concessions given to the Huguenots. After the military leaders of both sides were either killed or captured in battles at Rouen, Dreux, and Orléans, the regent mediated a truce and issued the Edict of Amboise (1563).

==== Armed peace ====
Charles IX as an adult, by François Clouet

The war was followed by four years of an uneasy "armed peace", during which time Catherine united the factions in the successful effort to recapture Le Havre from the English. After this victory, Charles declared his legal majority in August 1563, formally ending the regency. However, Catherine continued to play a principal role in politics, and often dominated her son. In March 1564, the King and his mother set out from Fontainebleau on a grand tour of France. Their tour spanned two years and brought them through Bar, Lyon, Salon-de-Provence (where they visited Nostradamus), Carcassonne, Toulouse (where the King and his younger brother Henry were confirmed), Bayonne, La Rochelle, and Moulins. At Bayonne, he met with his sister Elisabeth of Valois, and the duke of Alba for diplomatic talks. During this trip, Charles IX issued the Edict of Roussillon, which standardised 1 January as the first day of the year throughout France.

=== Second and third war of religion ===
War again broke out in 1567 after Charles added 6,000 Swiss mercenaries to his personal guards. Huguenots, fearing a Catholic attack was imminent, tried to abduct the king at Meaux, seized various cities, and massacred Catholics at Nîmes in an action known as the Michelade. The Battle of Saint-Denis resulted in a Huguenot defeat and the death of Anne de Montmorency, the royal commander-in-chief, and the short war ended in 1568 with the Peace of Longjumeau. The privileges granted to Protestants were widely opposed, however, leading to their cancellation and the resumption of war. The Dutch Republic, England and Navarre intervened on the Protestant side, while Spain, Tuscany and Pope Pius V supported the Catholics. Finally, the royal debt and the King's desire to seek a peaceful solution led to yet another truce, the Peace of Saint-Germain-en-Laye in August 1570, which again granted concessions to the Huguenots.

=== Marriage and children ===
On 26 November 1570, Charles married Elisabeth of Austria, with whom he fathered one daughter, Marie Elisabeth. In 1573, Charles fathered an illegitimate son, Charles, Duke of Angoulême, with his mistress, Marie Touchet.

=== Coligny's ascendancy and the massacre ===
Royal monogram

After the conclusion of the Peace of Saint-Germain-en-Laye in 1570, the king increasingly came under the influence of Admiral Gaspard de Coligny, who had succeeded the slain Prince of Condé as leader of Huguenots after the Battle of Jarnac in 1569. Catherine, however, became increasingly fearful of Coligny's unchecked power, especially since he was pursuing an alliance with England and the Dutch. Coligny was also hated by Henry, Duke of Guise, who accused the Admiral of having ordered the assassination of his father Francis of Guise during the siege of Orléans in 1563.

During the peace settlement, a marriage was arranged between Charles's sister Margaret of Valois and Henry of Navarre, the future King Henry IV, who was at that time heir to the throne of Navarre and one of the leading Huguenots. Many Huguenot nobles, including Admiral de Coligny, thronged into Paris for the wedding, which was set for 18 August 1572. On 22 August, a failed attempt on Coligny's life put the city in a state of apprehension, as both visiting Huguenots and Parisian Catholics feared an attack by the other side.

In this situation, in the early morning of 24 August 1572, the Duke of Guise moved to avenge his father and murdered Coligny in his lodgings. As Coligny's body was thrown into the street, Parisians mutilated the body. The mob action then erupted into the St. Bartholomew's Day massacre, a systematic slaughter of Huguenots that was to last five days. Henry of Navarre managed to avoid death by pledging to convert to Catholicism. Over the next few weeks, the disorder spread to more cities across France. In all, up to 10,000 Huguenots were killed in Paris and the provinces.

Though the massacres weakened Huguenot power, they also reignited war, which only ceased after the Edict of Boulogne in 1573 granted Huguenots amnesty and limited religious freedom. However, the year 1574 saw a failed Huguenot coup at Saint-Germain and successful Huguenot uprisings in Normandy, Poitou and the Rhône valley, setting the stage for another round of war.

=== Decline and death ===
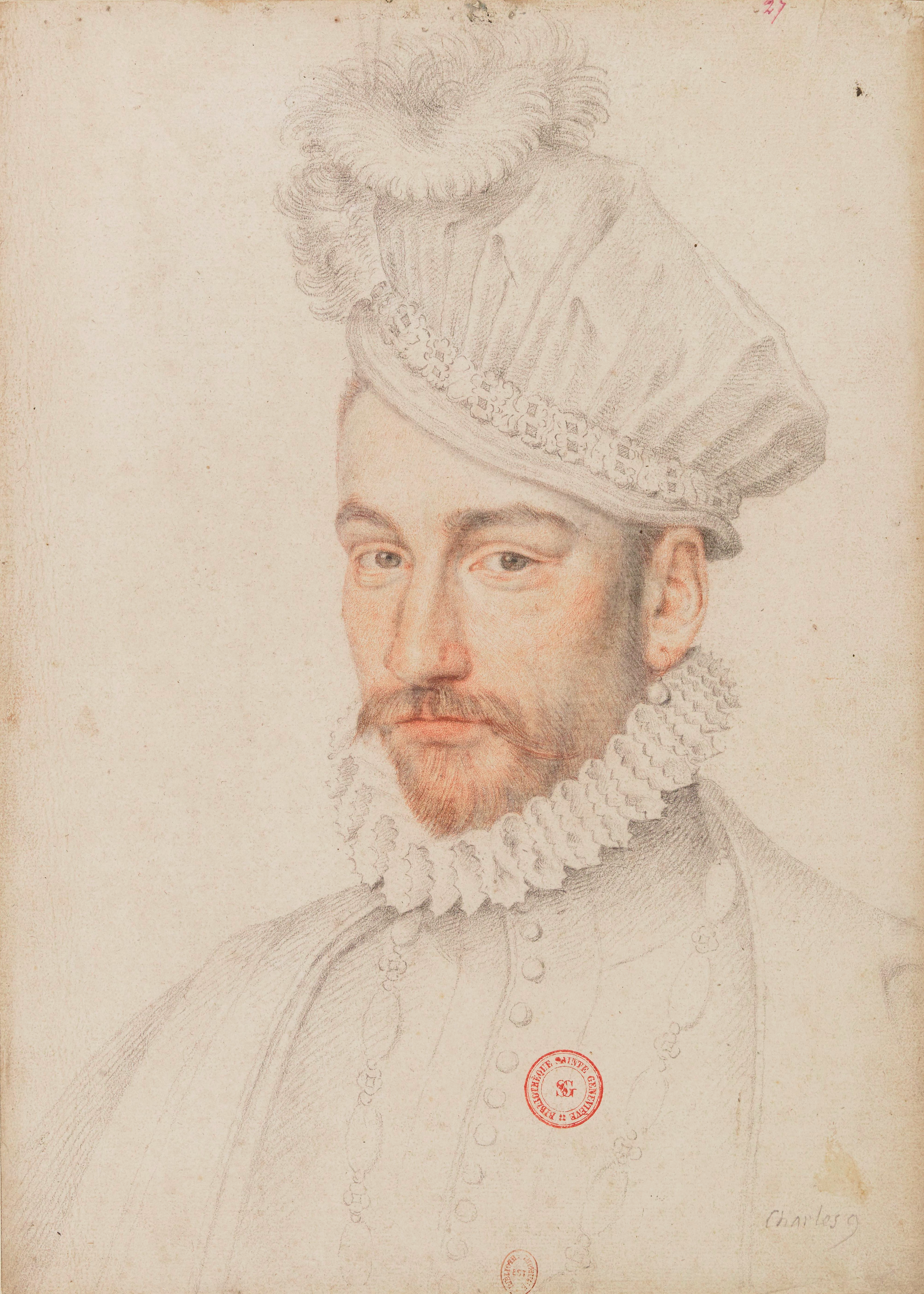
Chalk portrait of Charles IX by François Clouet, c. 1570

In the aftermath of the massacre, the king's fragile mental and physical constitution weakened drastically. His moods swung from boasting about the extremity of the massacre to exclamations that the screams of the murdered Huguenots kept ringing in his ears. Frantically, he blamed alternately himself – "What blood shed! What murders!", he cried to his nurse. "What evil counsel I have followed! O my God, forgive me... I am lost! I am lost!" – or his mother – "Who but you is the cause of all of this? God's blood, you are the cause of it all!" Catherine responded by declaring she had a lunatic for a son.

Charles's physical condition, probably caused by tuberculosis, deteriorated to the point where, by spring of 1574, his hoarse coughing turned bloody and his hemorrhages grew more violent.

Charles IX died at the Château de Vincennes on 30 May 1574, aged 23. Given that his younger brother Henry, Duke of Anjou, had recently been elected King of the Polish-Lithuanian Commonwealth and was away from France, their mother Catherine resumed the regency until Henry's return from Poland.

In 1625, long after his death, a book Charles wrote on hunting, La Chasse Royale, was published. The book goes into the history of hounds and hunting.

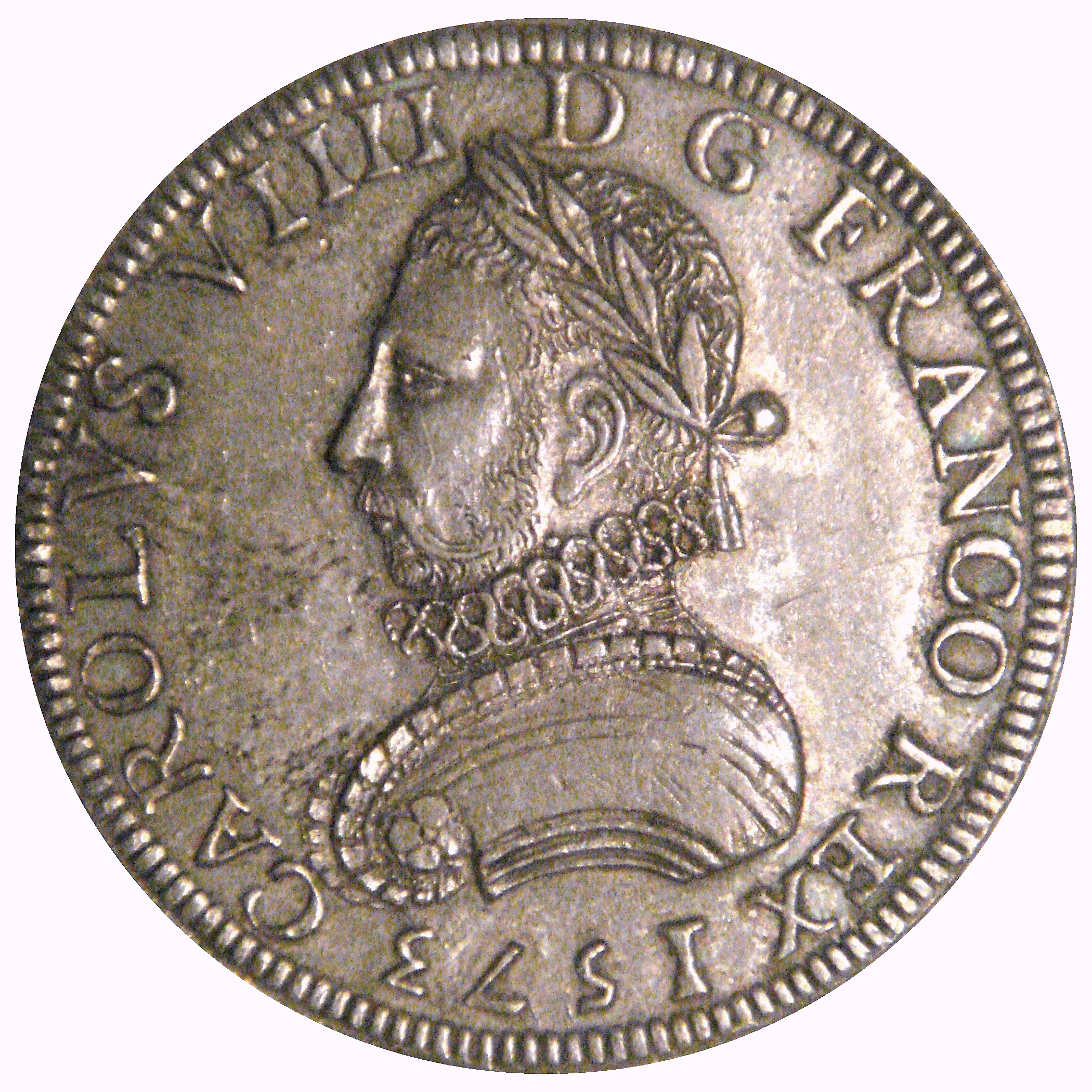
Coin of Charles IX, 1573

== See also ==
- Louis Duret

Charles IX of France House of Valois, Angoulême branch Cadet branch of the Capetian dynasty Born: 27 June 1550 Died: 30 May 1574
Regnal titles
Preceded by Francis II	King of France; 5 December 1560 – 30 May 1574	Succeeded by Henry III
