= Henry IV of France's wives and mistresses =

Sexual history of Henry IV of France

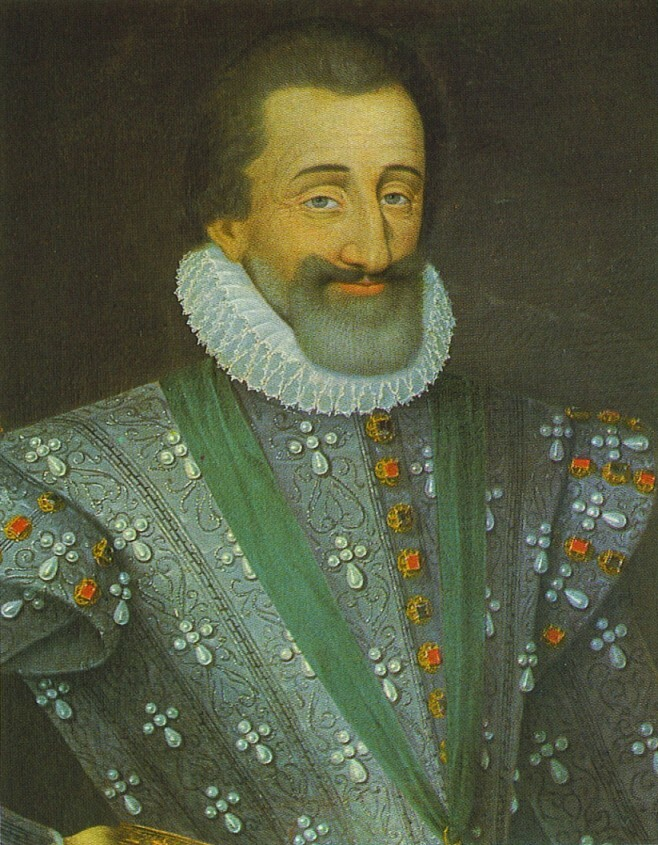
Henry IV was notorious for his tumultuous and politically complicated love life.

Henry IV of France's wives and mistresses played a significant role in the politics of his reign. Both Henry (1553–1610) and his first wife Margaret of Valois, whom he married in 1572, were repeatedly unfaithful to each other, and the collapse of their marriage led to their estrangement and living apart. Although Henry fathered children with a series of mistresses, his lack of a legitimate heir became a cause of concern, and his marriage was not annulled until 1599. In 1600, at the age of forty-six, he married his second wife, Marie de' Medici. They had six children, including the future Louis XIII. Henry was unfaithful to his second wife as well and insisted that she raise his illegitimate children along with her own.

Henry's womanising became legendary, earning him the nickname of Le Vert Galant. (Note: "The verdant gallant", referring to Henry's "playboy" reputation.) His sexual appetite was said to have been insatiable, and he always kept mistresses, often several at a time, as well as engaging in random sexual encounters and visits to brothels. Even so, he tended to elevate one mistress above the others and shower her with money, honours, and promises. His two most famous mistresses of this type were Gabrielle d'Estrées, who died in 1599, and her successor, Henriette d'Entragues, who involved herself in plots against the crown. Henry promised marriage to each of them, exposing himself to a series of political problems.

== Parents ==
Born in 1553, Henry was the son of Jeanne d'Albret, who became the Queen Regnant of Navarre two years after he was born. His father, Antoine of Bourbon, was constantly unfaithful to Jeanne. The couple also differed over religion: Jeanne became a staunch Huguenot, whereas Antoine wavered, for political reasons, between the Catholicism of his birth and the faith of his wife. His vacillating character earned him the epithet ondoyant (one whose mind changes, or undulates) from the essayist Montaigne, a description later sometimes applied to his son. The public squabbling between Jeanne and Antoine became scandalous during Henry's childhood, and in 1560, when he was seven, Jeanne took him to the French court. After Antoine ordered her back to her kingdom of Navarre in 1562, she left Henry behind, and she was reunited with him only in 1566 during the royal progress to the south. Among Henry's playmates at the French court were the future Henry III of France and Henry of Guise.

== Margaret of Valois ==
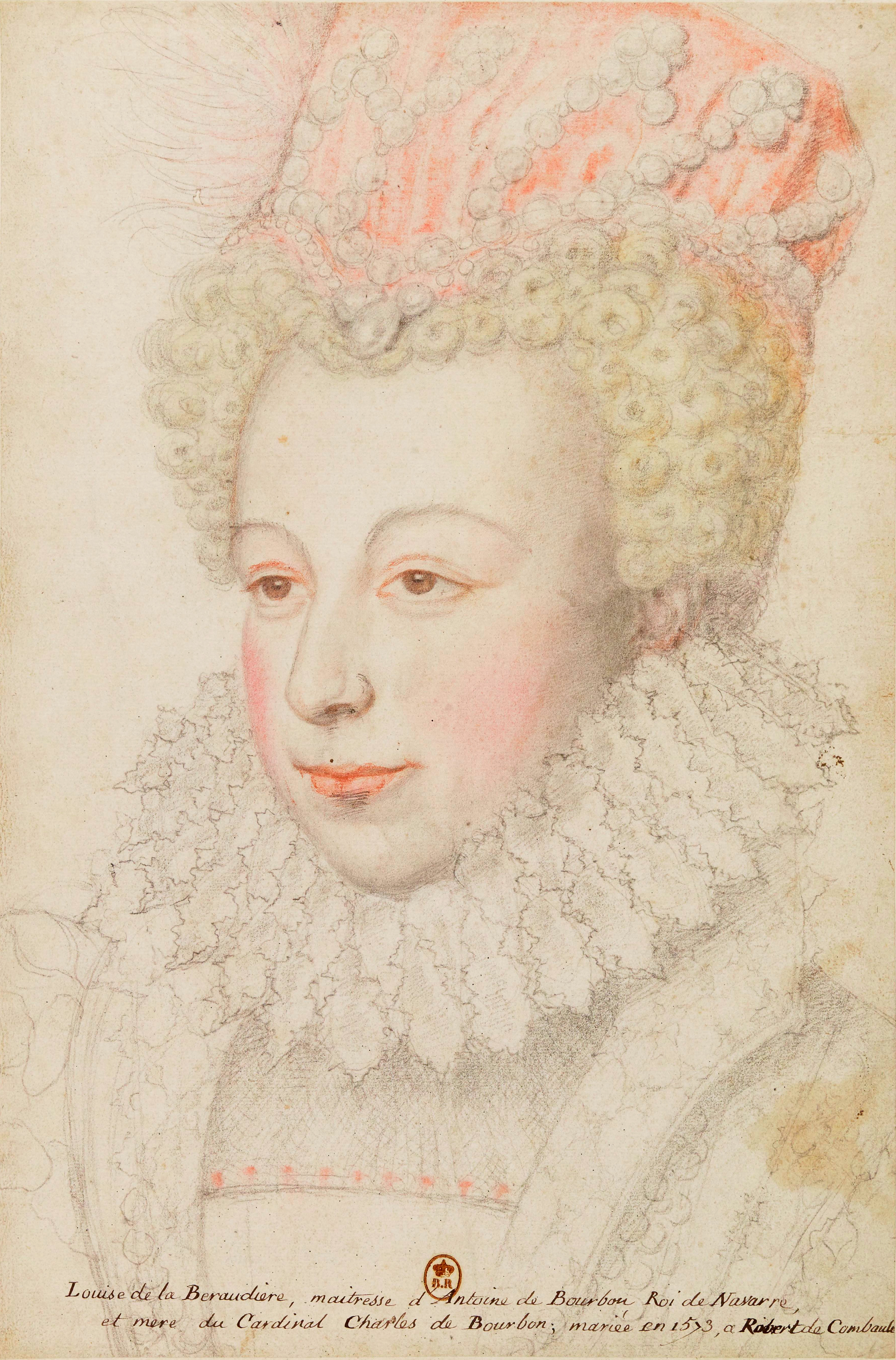
Margaret of Valois, by François Clouet, c. 1570. Usually remembered for her scandalous and stormy life, Margaret was above all an active politician, acting as a mediator between Catholics and Huguenots. She was also an intellectual, a protector of the arts and also a writer and poet. Her most important work was her Memoirs, the first written in a modern style by a woman.

After the signature of the peace of Saint-Germain, Catherine de' Medici, the powerful mother of King Charles IX, was convinced by François of Montmorency to marry her daughter Margaret with Henry. The match was in fact assumed almost thirteen years earlier by the late King Henry II. Catherine, who believed in dynastic marriage as a potent political tool, aimed to unite the interests of the Valois and the Bourbons, and create harmony between Catholics and Huguenots in the reign of France.

By all accounts, Margaret of Valois was deemed highly attractive, even sexually magnetic: "The beauty of that princess is more divine than human, she is made to damn and ruin men rather than to save them", said about her Don John of Austria came to court just to see her. (Note: After watching her in a festival procession, the court chronicler Pierre de Bourdeille, seigneur de Brantôme described her as follows: "One had never seen anything lovelier in the world. Beside the beauty of her face and her well-turned body, she was superbly dressed and fantastically valuable jewellery adorned her attire. Her lovely face shone with faultless white skin and her hair was dressed with big white pearls, precious stones and extremely rare diamonds shaped like stars—one could say that her natural beauty and the shimmering of her jewels competed with a brilliant night sky full of stars, so to speak".) Margaret had also an enterprising and flirtatious character. Shortly before this marriage plan with Henry of Navarre, she had been involved in a scandal: it was discovered that she encouraged the handsome Henry of Guise, who intended to marry her, entertaining a secret correspondence with him. When her family discovered it put an end to the crush between them and sent Henry of Guise away from court. (Note: Spanish ambassador Don Alava relates that when Catherine found this out, she and the king then beat Margaret, ripping her nightclothes and pulling out handfuls of her hair.)

Some sources claim the duke of Guise was Margaret's first lover, but this is highly unlikely. For political reasons, the duty of a Daughter of France was to be a virgin at the wedding and for this she was very guarded. If Margaret had really compromised her reputation, Jeanne d'Albret would not accept the marriage between her son and the princess. Although certainly after the wedding, Margaret was unfaithful to her husband, many of the extramarital adventures are the result of pamphlets that have had to politically discredit her and her family: the most famous was Le Divorce Satyrique (1607), who described her as a nymphomaniac.

Margaret complied with her mother's desire to marry Henry, provided she was not forced to convert to Protestantism. When Jeanne arrived at the French court after receiving numerous pressures from Catherine, she was extremely impressed by Margaret: "She has frankly owned to me the favourable impression which she has formed of you. With her beauty and wit, she exercises a great influence over the Queen-Mother and the King, and Messieurs her younger brothers." The problems began when the Protestant Jeanne discovered that Margaret had no intention of abjuring Catholicism. (Note: When Jeanne did attend court, Catherine piled mental pressure on her. Jeanne wrote to Henry: "I am not free to talk with either the King or Madame, only the Queen Mother, who goads me [me traite á la fourche]… You have doubtless realized that their main object, my son, is to separate you from God, and from me".) Meanwhile the marriage negotiations were repeatedly impeded by the Pope and the King of Spain.

Tired of the duration of the negotiations, Charles IX decided that the wedding would be celebrated by the Cardinal of Bourbon even without papal dispensation, so Jeanne gave her consent to the wedding by promising that Henry could remain a Huguenot. When Jeanne arrived in Paris to buy clothes for the wedding, she was taken ill and died, aged forty-four; and Henry succeeded her as the King of Navarre. (Note: Huguenot writers later accused Catherine of murdering Jeanne with poisoned gloves: an autopsy revealed tuberculosis and an abscess.) Henry arrived in Paris in July 1572 and saw Margaret after six years of separation (they had spent their childhood together with the French court). Despite subsequent historiographic interpretations, contemporaries do not point out any mutual dissatisfaction between future spouses.

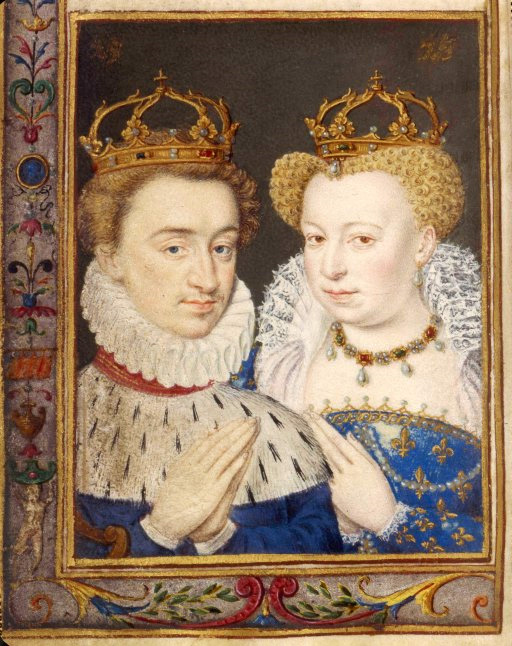
Henry of Navarre and Margaret of Valois

The controversial wedding took place on 18 August 1572 at Notre-Dame, Paris. (Note: A royal match between a Roman Catholic and a Huguenot was controversial and irregular. The different faiths of the bridal couple made for an unusual wedding service: for example, Henry did not attend the mass, where his place was taken by Margaret's brother Duke of Anjou.) After a nuptial lunch, four days of balls, masques and banquets ensued, only to be interrupted by the outbreak of violence in Paris. After the attempted assassination of the Huguenot leader Gaspard de Coligny on 22 August 1572, Catherine and Charles IX, to forestall the expected Huguenot backlash, ordered the murder of the Huguenot leaders gathered in Paris for the wedding. The result was the St. Bartholomew's Day massacre, in which thousands of Huguenots were killed in Paris and throughout the reign.

Margaret later described in her Memoirs the chaos and bloodshed in the Louvre Palace, where she and her new husband were lodged. Henry found himself escorted to a room with his cousin Henry of Condé, and told to choose between death and conversion to Roman Catholicism. He chose the latter. After the massacre, the Queen-Mother proposed to her daughter that the marriage be annulled, but Margaret replied that this was impossible because she had already had sexual relations with Henry and was "in every sense" his wife. She wrote in her Memoirs: "I suspected the design of separating me from my husband was in order to work some mischief against him."

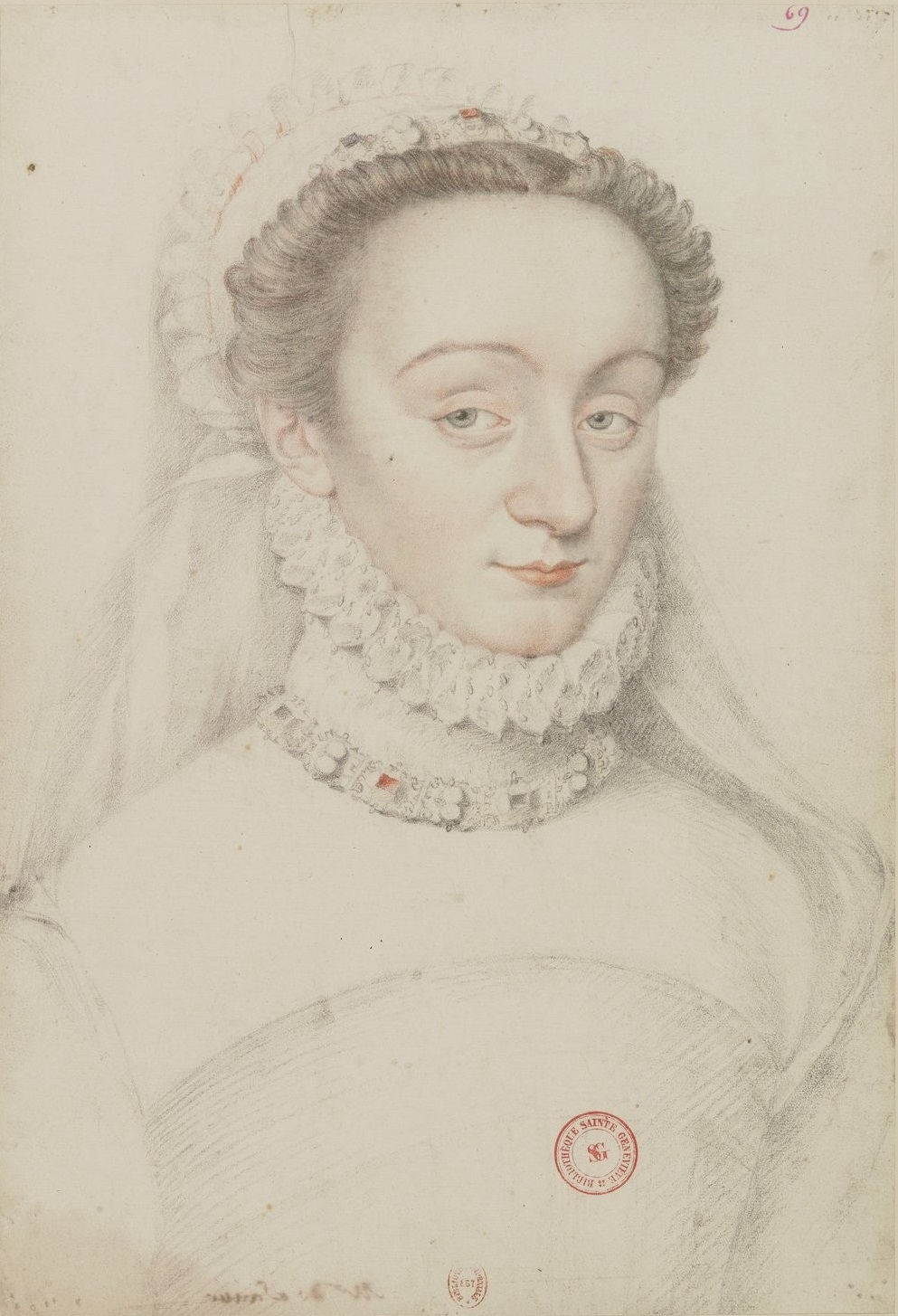
Charlotte de Sauve, Henry's mistress during the early years of his marriage to Marguerite of Valois, worked as an informant for Catherine de' Medici as a member of her "Flying Squadron"

Until 1576, Henry remained at court, siding with Margaret and her brother François of Alençon against Henry III, who became king in 1574. During this time, Henry of Navarre often ignored Margaret and instead slept with his mistress, Charlotte de Sauve. It appeared, in the words of Henry's biographer David Buisseret, as if "the pleasure-loving and libidinous elements of his ancestry had finally gained the upper hand". A rivalry developed between him and Alençon over the beautiful de Sauve, who was one of Catherine de' Medici's so-called "flying squadron", a group of "court lovelies" whom Catherine used to lure noblemen to court and, it was rumoured, as informants. According to Margaret's Memoirs, de Sauve "treated both of them in such a way that they became extremely jealous of each other… to such a point that they forgot their ambitions, their duties and their plans and thought of nothing but chasing after this woman". De Sauve may have been acting as a tool of Henry III and Catherine in their attempts to split the two men. Henry of Navarre's good judgement was already known to desert him when it came to women. He wrote to a friend:

This Court is the strangest place on earth. We are nearly always ready to cut each other's throats… All the band you know wants my death on account of my love for Monsieur [Alençon] and they have forbidden my mistress to speak to me. They have such a hold on her that she does not dare look at me… they say they will kill me, and I want to be one jump ahead of them.

Margaret's behaviour was also the subject of scandal. On one occasion in 1575, Catherine de' Medici was heard yelling at her, accusing her of taking a lover. In a separate incident, the king sent a band of assassins to murder Margaret's lover Bussy d'Amboise, a friend of Alençon's, who managed to escape. As Catherine's biographer Leonie Frieda puts it: "he then decided to leave the Court immediately citing health reasons, which happened to be nothing less than the truth". In 1576, Henry III accused Marguerite of improper relations with a lady-in-waiting. Margaret claimed in her Memoirs that he would have killed her if Catherine had not stopped him. Despite their sexual infidelities, Margaret remained politically loyal to her husband during the early period of their marriage and helped him negotiate the complexities of the court. By 1575, however, their relations were no longer physical: "I could not endure the pain that I felt", she recalled in her Memoirs, "and I stopped sleeping with the King my husband".

In 1576, Henry managed to slip away while hunting and made for his kingdom, where he abjured the Catholic religion on 13 June. For a time, the abandoned Margaret found herself imprisoned, suspected of complicity, and was afterwards distrusted by her own family. Henry eventually demanded that she be brought to him. In 1578, therefore, Catherine de' Medici travelled south to Nérac and duly delivered Margaret to her husband. At first, in this new phase in their marriage, the couple managed a show of harmony, but strains were apparent. In 1580 a religious war, later called the "Lovers' War", broke out between the Huguenots and King Henry III. Although inaccurate, this name for the war relates to a series of scandals at the Navarre court and to the notion that Henry of Navarre took up arms in response to jibes about his love life from the French court. At this point, he was conducting a passionate affair with a mistress known as "La Belle Fosseuse", while Margaret was involved with one of his own commanders, the Vicomte de Turenne. Henry wrote to Margaret apologising for the state of affairs between them. He expressed "extreme regret that instead of bringing you contentment… I have brought the opposite".

In 1582, Margaret returned to the French court without her husband, who was still openly besotted with La Fosseuse. Before long, she began taking lovers again, such as Harlay de Champvallon, one of her brother François's retinue, and acting more scandalously than ever. After a rumour that she had borne Champvallon a child, Henry III ordered her back to Navarre and then had her carriage searched and detained her in an abbey for questioning.

Henry of Navarre at first refused to take Margaret back unless Henry III made a public statement asserting her innocence of all the charges against her. Catherine de' Medici sent Pomponne de Bellièvre south to smooth things over and arrange Margaret's return. In a letter, she spelled out to Margaret that a royal wife must bear her husband's affairs without complaint, recalling proudly that her own conduct as a wife had been impeccable, despite all provocation. Margaret was reunited with Henry on 13 April 1584, but she failed to heed her mother's words, even though the death of her brother François in June 1584 made her husband heir presumptive to the French throne. Henry himself was under increased pressure to produce an heir. He was advised by his closest friend Philippe Duplessis-Mornay that it was now "time to make love to France".

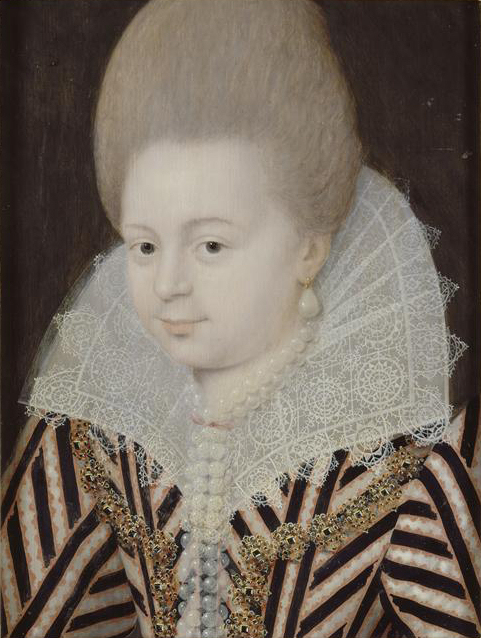
Henry's mistress Diane d'Andouins, Countess of Gramont, was nicknamed "La Belle Corisande".

In 1585, Henry embarked on a passionate love affair with a widow called Diane d'Andouins, nicknamed La Belle Corisande. Margaret found it impossible to ignore this particular lover of Henry's, since d'Andouins was pressing Henry to repudiate Margaret so that she could become queen of Navarre herself. Margaret responded by attempting to poison Henry, and then she shot at him with a pistol but missed. To escape his revenge, she fled the Kingdom of Navarre again, this time to her property at Agen. From there she wrote to her mother begging for money. Catherine sent her enough "to put food on her table" but was contemptuous.

Margaret attempted to strengthen the fortifications at Agen, raise troops, and ally with the Catholic League against her husband. Before long, however, the officials and people of Agen drove her out of the town. Retreating to her lofty and impregnable fortress of Carlat, and refusing her mother's pleas that she move to a royal manor, she there took a lover called d'Aubiac. Catherine's patience ran out, and she insisted that Henry III arrest "this insufferable torment" and act "before she brings shame on us again".

On 13 October 1586, therefore, the king had Margaret forcibly removed from Carlat and locked up in the Château d'Usson. D'Aubiac was executed, though not, as Catherine demanded, in front of Margaret. (Note: Henry III wrote to his secretary Villeroy: "The Queen my mother wishes me to hang Obyac [sic] in the presence of this miserable creature [Margaret] in the courtyard of the Château d'Usson".) Catherine cut Marguerite out of her will. Margaret never saw her mother or brother again. Margaret assumed she was going to die and even employed a food taster at the château. In a "farewell" letter to her mother, she asked that after her execution a post-mortem be held to prove that she was not, despite gossip, pregnant with d'Aubiac's child. At this point, her luck took a turn for the better. Her gaoler, the Marquis de Canillac, whom she was rumoured to have seduced, suddenly switched from the royal side in the civil war to that of the Catholic League and released her in early 1587. Her freedom suited the League perfectly: her continued existence guaranteed that Henry of Navarre would remain without an heir. This problem became acute for Henry after he succeeded to the throne of France in 1589.

== Gabrielle d'Estrées ==
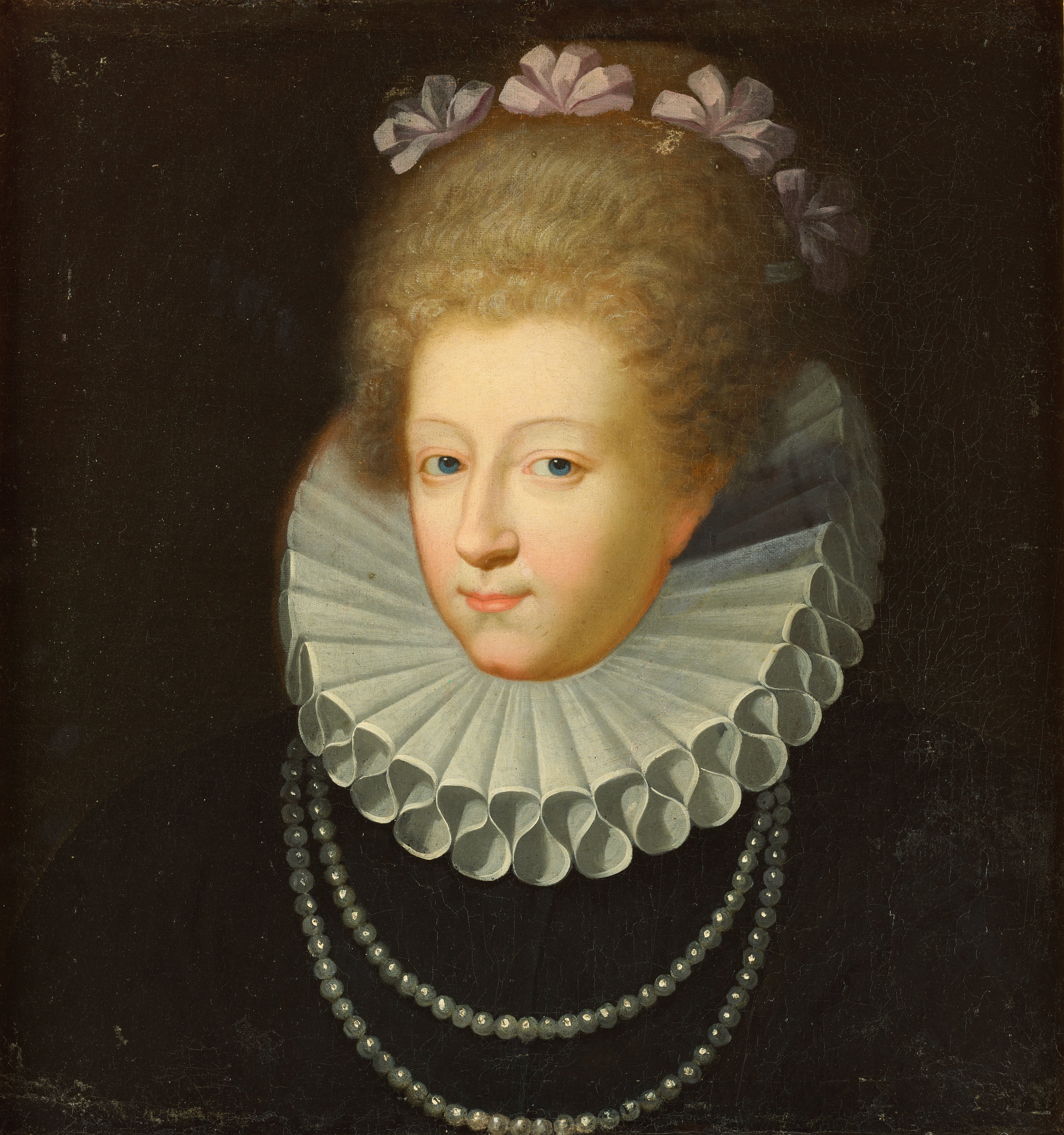
Gabrielle d'Estrées, Duchess of Beaufort, came closest of all Henry's mistresses to marrying him.

Henry IV was an energetic soldier who spent long periods at war. After military campaigns, he rewarded himself with bouts of idle pleasure, hunting during the day, gambling in the evening, and womanising at night. His companion in these leisure pursuits was often the banker Sébastien Zamet, who lent him vast sums of money and made his house available to the king for dalliances. One drawback to Henry's philandering, however, was a proneness to venereal diseases. In October 1598, he nearly died from an infection of the bladder, and an attack of gonorrhoea a few weeks later briefly brought on a heart problem. On 6 November, he wrote to the Duke of Sully that the illness "has made me very depressed [tout chagrin], and I do everything that my doctors recommend, so keen am I to get better".

Henry's sexual appetite, said to have been insatiable, was often indiscriminate, but he always recognised a particular mistress as his first lady. One such was Gabrielle d'Estrées, whom he met at Cœuvres in 1590 and later made the duchess of Beaufort. This relationship was castigated by Henry's enemies in the church, particularly by the Capuchins. On one occasion, arriving at her apartments near the Louvre, Henry was stabbed in the face by a Jesuit would-be-assassin called Jean Chastel, who slashed his mouth and broke one of his teeth. In June 1594, d'Estrées bore Henry a son, César, who was legitimized in Jan/Feb 1595. Henry's duchess had gradually risen in prominence, and she acted as her royal lover's hostess for diplomatic occasions, such as the surrender talks with the rebel Charles of Lorraine, Duke of Mayenne, in 1596. In October of that year, an Italian observer reported that "among the French nobility people begin to expect that the king intends to name as his successor the natural son born of Gabrielle". Henry's advisers were deeply opposed to any such plan, however, which would guarantee a war of succession—but, for a while, Henry seemed determined. (Note: In March 1597, the Cardinal of Florence reported that "nobody dares to speak to him about it".) When the last of the Catholic League rebels, Philippe Emmanuel, Duke of Mercœur, surrendered in 1598, Henry and Gabrielle's son, César, was ceremonially promised in marriage to Mercœur's daughter, though both were small children. (Note: As an English report of the negotiations put it: "Many a good Frenchman laughed, to see a couple of puppies, that knew not the difference between a contract and a botterfly, should be putt together with such an assembly [sic]".) The chronicler Pierre de L'Estoile records a vignette of Gabrielle d'Estrées' status at this time: "The duchess of Beaufort [was] seated in a chair, and Madame de Guise brought her the various dishes with great ceremony. Gabrielle took what she most liked with one hand, and gave her other to be kissed by the king, who was near her".

By early 1599, Henry's marriage to Marguerite of Valois looked likely to be annulled at last. And so, at the age of forty-six and still without a legitimate heir, Henry felt free to propose to Gabrielle d'Estrées. (Note: By 1593, when Henry first proposed an annulment of his marriage, he had not seen Queen Margaret for eleven years. Although Marguerite was agreeable, the annulment was not granted until six years later.) On Mardi Gras, Henry placed on her finger the ring with which he had "married" France at his coronation in 1593. During Holy Week, however, Gabrielle, who was pregnant at the time, fell ill; by Holy Saturday, to the relief of many in France, she was dead. Rumours flew that she had been poisoned, but in fact she died from eclampsia and a premature birth of a stillborn son. Though grief-stricken, Henry grasped that his fiancée's death had saved him from disaster: his plan to declare his two sons by d'Estrées heirs to the throne would have precipitated a major political crisis. The English agent Edmondes reported:

And the King himselfe doth freelie confesse it, that albeit her death is a great grief unto him, in regard that he did so dearlie love her, and intending as he acknowledgeth to have married her, but that God having directlie manifested that he would not suffer him to fall into the danger of so great an error and inconvenience to himselfe and to his state, that he will not fail to make a lesson thereof.

Henry provided Gabrielle d'Estrées with a grandiose funeral and drowned his sorrows with a sustained spree of womanising. Sir Henry Neville, the English ambassador, reported that Henry was spending time "in secret manner at Zamet's house", where "la belle garce Claude" was known to entertain, and that he was fervently courting Henriette d'Entragues, the daughter of Charles IX's former mistress, Marie Touchet. Royal accounts record that Henry was soon making large payments to "Mademoiselle d'Entragues", as well as to "Mademoiselle des Fossez". D'Entragues quickly replaced d'Estrées as Henry's principal mistress. She extracted from him, in Neville's words, "100,000 crowns in ready money and an yearly pension" as proof of his commitment. At about the same time, Henry began affairs with Marie Babou de la Bourdaisière and with two wives of Paris parlement members, madames Quélin and Potier.

== Marie de' Medici ==
In October 1599, the parlement of Paris officially petitioned that Henry marry a princess worthy of his dignity. Henry took note and began considering candidates from several foreign states. According to Sully, however, he ruled out a German wife, on the grounds that it would feel like going to bed with a wine-barrel. Henry was keenest on Maria de' Medici, the niece of Ferdinando I de' Medici, Grand Duke of Tuscany, and the daughter of the previous duke, Francesco I de' Medici. What he found particularly attractive about Maria was her enormous wealth.

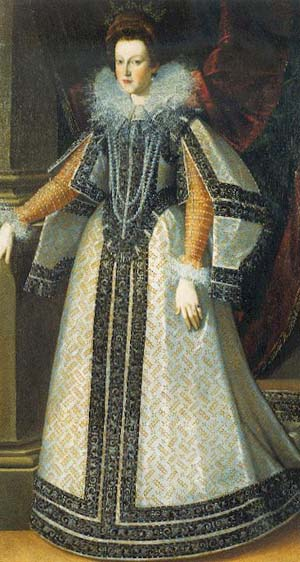
Henry's second wife, Marie de' Medici. Ralph Winwood described her as "of a comely stature", whose beauty was without artifice.

On 17 December 1599, the Archbishop of Arles pronounced the annulment of Henry's marriage to Margaret of Valois. (Note: The grounds were closeness of kin; that Margaret's father, Henry II, had been Henry's godfather; and that Catherine de' Medici had forced Margaret into the marriage against her will.) The Medici marriage contract was signed in April 1600, pledging a huge dowry of 600,000 écus, part of which was subtracted to pay Henry's debts to Ferdinando. Henry played his part by proclaiming undying devotion to Maria in a series of letters, though he was sending similar love letters to Henriette d'Entragues, telling her in one that he wanted to kiss her a million times. A proxy marriage took place in Florence in October 1600, and then Maria—to be known in France as Marie—sailed in great pomp for Marseille, where she disembarked on 3 November. Henry, on campaign in Savoy, rode to meet her at Lyon, where he found her at supper. He visited her afterwards in her chamber; according to Ralph Winwood, secretary to English ambassador Sir Henry Neville:

She met him at the door, and offered to kneel down, but he took her in his arms, where he held her embraced a long time ... He doth profess to the World the great Contentment he finds in her, how that for her Beauty, her sweet and pleasing carriage, her gracious behaviour, she doth surpass the relation which hath been made of her, and the Expectation which he thereby conceived.

The couple underwent a second marriage ceremony in Lyon; and Marie finally reached Paris on 7 February, already pregnant. She found her new home, the Louvre, so shabby that at first she thought Henry was playing a joke. She gave birth to a son, Louis, at the Palace of Fontainebleau on 27 September 1601, to the delight of Henry, who had rushed from military duties to her bedside to serve, he joked, as one of her midwives. The moment Henry was told that the child was a boy, he ushered two hundred courtiers into the chamber to share the euphoria. The baby was fed a spoonful of wine and handed over to a governess, Baroness Robert de Harlay, baron de Monglat, and to the physician Jean Héroard, an expert on the bone structure of horses. According to Winwood, the baby was a "strong and a goodly prince, and doth promise long life". The birth of a dauphin, as the first son of a French king was known, inspired rejoicing and bonfires throughout France.

Marie believed that after bearing a son, she "would begin to be a queen". However, a few weeks later, Henriette d'Entragues also produced a son (Gaston Henri, Duc de Verneuil) and Henry not only made just as much fuss over this son but declared that he was better-looking, not fat and dark like Louis and the Medici. In the words of biographer David Buisseret, "the royal couple was well embarked upon nine years of mutual recrimination and misunderstandings, in which the fault plainly lay with the king".

Henry had made Marie's position clear to her from the first. When she began by pressing him to accept the decrees of the Council of Trent, he told her to keep her nose out of state business and look after herself. (Note: Among other losses to the Gallican Church, this would have meant Henry giving up the right to appoint his own bishops.) Shortly after Marie's arrival in Paris, Henry had introduced Henriette d'Entragues to her, reportedly pushing Henriette further towards the ground when her curtsey was not low enough. He housed his senior mistress close to the Louvre and was seen dining with the queen and d'Entragues together. Marie also had to cope with a second public mistress, La Bourdaisière, as well as with Henry's continued visits to Zamet's house for services provided by "la belle garce Claude". In the next nine years, Marie bore Henry six children; but he also sired five more by d'Entragues, Jacqueline de Bueil, and Charlotte des Essarts. Nonetheless, Henry often wrote affectionate letters to Marie and in other ways treated her with respect.

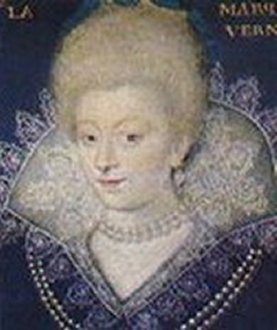
Henriette d'Entragues, Marquise de Verneuil, believed that Henry had legally promised to marry her and that his children by the queen were therefore bastards.

Henriette d'Entragues never reconciled herself to Henry's marriage, and she drove Marie to tears by calling her his "fat banker", claiming her own children were Henry's legitimate heirs and branding the dauphin a bastard. Henry's devotion to d'Entragues was tested during the revolt of Marshal Biron in 1602, in which her half-brother, Charles, Count of Auvergne, was implicated and she was compromised. Though Biron was executed, Henry released Auvergne to please Henriette. In 1604, she was at the heart of a Spanish-backed plot to install her son by the king as heir to the throne. (Note: Henriette d'Entragues possessed a letter from Henry promising to marry her if she bore him a son; and she and her ambitious family used this document to challenge Henry's marriage to Marie. They hoped to convince the pope to annul the marriage, leaving Prince Louis a bastard.) Her father, the sieur d'Entragues, was involved in this plot, along with, again, her half-brother. Henriette d'Entragues was sentenced to confinement in a convent, but Henry was moved to spare her even that and allowed her to retire to her estate at Verneuil (Note: He also released her father and merely imprisoned her half-brother, though both had been sentenced to death for lèse-majesté.) Despite the king's clemency, Henriette d'Entragues may have continued to plot further against him. According to a government report of 1616, a former companion of d'Entragues, Mlle d'Escoman, had claimed in 1611 that d'Entragues had met François Ravaillac, Henry's assassin of 1610. However, this evidence is compromised by the fact that, at the time she made this accusation, Mlle d'Escoman was in prison on another charge. (Note: "It is hard to know how much of her story to believe.")

The dauphin, Louis, turned out to be a difficult and temperamental child, and some historians have blamed this on his parents and the circumstances of his upbringing. He was raised just outside Paris at the château of Saint-Germain-en-Laye, not only alongside Marie's other children by Henry but, as Henry insisted, with several children of Henry's mistresses. Henry always seemed to get his mistresses pregnant at the same time as Marie. Just as Marie was in constant competition with Henry's mistresses, so her children were forced to compete with their children for his affection. The fact that Henry's three children by Gabrielle d'Estrées were older than the heir to the throne caused particular problems of rivalry. César and Alexandre were later to rebel against Louis when he was king. He did not hesitate to throw them into prison.

Louis shared his father's stubbornness, but he may have inherited his temper tantrums from his mother, who often gave Henry tongue-lashings in public. Although Marie has been accused of lacking affection for her children, a study of her letters reveals the contrary, though she was a stern disciplinarian. She wrote to the dauphin's governess, for example, asking her to avoid whippings when the weather was hot and to beat Louis only "with such caution that the anger he might feel would not cause any illness". On another occasion, she reprimanded her middle daughter, Christine, for being ill, accusing her of not following the advice of her doctors. Marie personally educated the children in practical matters, such as etiquette. After Henry's assassination in 1610, she became regent of France and retained influence over Louis XIII until he finally rejected her in 1617.

Henry's last passion was for Charlotte of Montmorency, the fifteen-year-old wife of Henry, prince of Condé, First Prince of the Blood. The king had arranged Charlotte's marriage to Condé for his own convenience, in order to sleep with her himself when he pleased. To escape from this predicament, the couple fled to Brussels. The king was enraged and threatened to march into Flanders with an army unless the Habsburg governors returned Condé and his wife at once. At the time, he was also threatening war with the Habsburgs over the succession to the United Duchies of Jülich-Cleves-Berg, so historians are unsure how crucial in itself Charlotte's return was as a reason for war. Condé continued to provoke Henry from Flanders. When asked to drink to the queen of France, he replied that there seemed to be more than one queen of France, maybe as many as four or five.

== See also ==
- List of French royal mistresses

== Children ==
=== Legitimate children ===
On 18 August 1572, Henry married Margaret of Valois; their childless marriage was annulled in 1599. His subsequent marriage to Marie de' Medici on 17 December 1600 produced six children:

Name	Birth	Death	Notes
Louis XIII, King of France	27 September 1601	14 May 1643	Married Anne of Austria in 1615.
Elisabeth, Queen of Spain	22 November 1602	6 October 1644	Married Philip IV, King of Spain in 1615.
Christine Marie, Duchess of Savoy	12 February 1606	27 December 1663	Married Victor Amadeus I, Duke of Savoy in 1619.
Nicholas Henri de France, duc d'Orléans	16 April 1607	17 November 1611	Died young.
Gaston, Duke of Orléans	25 April 1608	2 February 1660	Married (1) Marie de Bourbon, Duchess of Montpensier in 1626. Married (2) Margaret of Lorraine in 1632.
Henrietta Maria, Queen of England	25 November 1609	10 September 1669	Married Charles I, King of England in 1625.

=== Illegitimate children ===
By Gabrielle d'Estrées, Duchess of Beaufort:

Name	Birth	Legitimized	Death	Notes
César de Bourbon, duc de Vendôme	3 June 1594	January 1595	22 October 1665	Married Françoise de Lorraine. In 1626, he participated in a plot against Cardinal Richelieu. He was captured and held in prison until 1630.
Catherine-Henriette de Bourbon	26 March 1596	March 1597	20 June 1663	Married Charles of Lorraine, Duke of Elbeuf.
Alexandre, Chevalier de Vendôme	23 April 1598	April 1599	8 February 1629	After the 1626 plot with his brother César, he was held in prison until his death.
Unnamed son	1599	-	1599	Stillborn

By Henriette d'Entragues, Marquise de Verneuil:

Name	Birth	Legitimized	Death	Notes
Gaston Henri, Duc de Verneuil	3 November 1601	January 1603	28 May 1682	Married Charlotte Seguier, daughter of Pierre Séguier, Duc de Villemor.
Gabrielle Angelique, called Mademoiselle de Verneuil	21 January 1603	Unknown, but her birth was legitimized.	24 April 1627	Married Bernard de Nogaret de Foix, Duc de La Valette et d'Epernon.

By Jacqueline de Bueil, Countess of Moret:

Name	Birth	Legitimized	Death	Notes
Antoine, Count de Moret	9 May 1607	January 1608	1 September 1632	Abbot of St. Etienne. Died from wounds received in action.

By Charlotte des Essarts, Countess of Romorantin (who went on to marry Louis III, Cardinal of Guise in 1611):

Name	Birth	Legitimized	Death	Notes
Jeanne Baptiste	early January 1608	May 1608	16 January 1670	Abbess of Fontevrault.
Marie Henriette	1609	Unknown, but her birth was legitimized.	10 February 1629	Abbess of Chelles.

== Bibliography ==
- Bergin, Joseph (1996). The Making of the French Episcopate, 1589-1661. Yale University Press.
- Pierre de Bourdeille, seigneur de Brantôme, Illustrious Dames of the Court of the Valois Kings. Translated by Katharine Prescott Wormeley. New York: Lamb, 1912. OCLC 347527.
- Jacqueline Boucher, Deux épouses et reines à la fin du XVIe siècle: Louise de Lorraine et Marguerite de France, Saint-Étienne, Presses universitaires de Saint-Étienne, 1998, ISBN 978-2862720807. (in French)
- Buisseret, David. Henry IV, King of France. New York: Routledge, 1990. ISBN 0-04-445635-2.
- Bryson, David M. Queen Jeanne and the Promised Land: Dynasty, Homeland, Religion and Violence in Sixteenth-century France. Leiden and Boston, Massachusetts: Brill Academic, 1999. ISBN 90-04-11378-9.
- Benedetta Craveri, Amanti e regine. Il potere delle donne, Milano, Adelphi, 2008, ISBN 978-88-459-2302-9. (in Italian)
- Nancy Goldstone, The Rival Queens, Little Brown and Company, 2015.
- Marc P. Holt, The French Wars of Religion, 1562–1629, Cambridge: Cambridge University Press, 2005.
- Robert J. Knecht, The French Wars of Religion, 1559–1598, 1989
- Robert J. Knecht, Catherine de' Medici. London and New York: Longman, 1998. ISBN 0-582-08241-2.
- Michel Moisan, L'exil auvergnat de Marguerite de Valois (la reine Margot) : Carlat-Usson, 1585–1605, Editions Creer, 1999. (in French)
- Moote, A. Lloyd (1991). Louis XIII, the Just. University of California Press. ISBN 0-520-07546-3.
- Mousnier, Roland. The Assassination of Henry IV: The Tyrannicide Problem and the Consolidation of the French Absolute Monarchy in the Early Seventeenth Century. Translated by Joan Spencer. London: Faber and Faber, 1973. ISBN 0-684-13357-1.
- Vincent J. Pitts, Henri IV of France; His Reign and Age, JHU Press, 2009.
- Robert J. Sealy, The Myth of Reine Margot: Toward the Elimination of a Legend, Peter Lang Publishing, 1994.
- Éliane Viennot, Marguerite de Valois. La reine Margot, Paris, Perrin, 2005 ISBN 2-262-02377-8. (in French)
- Kathleen Wellman, Queens and Mistresses of Renaissance France, 2013
- Hugh Noel Williams, Queen Margot, wife of Henry of Navarre, New York, Harper and brothers, 1907.
- Marguerite of Valois, Memoirs of Marguerite de Valois, written by herself, New York, Merrill & Baker, 1800
