= Charles d'Angoulême =

Charles d'Angoulême may refer to:

- Charles, Count of Angoulême (1459–1496)
- Charles II de Valois, Duke of Orléans (1522–1545)
- Charles de Valois, Duke of Angoulême (1573–1650)
