= Louis-Charles de Nogaret de Foix =

- Duke of Valette and Candale
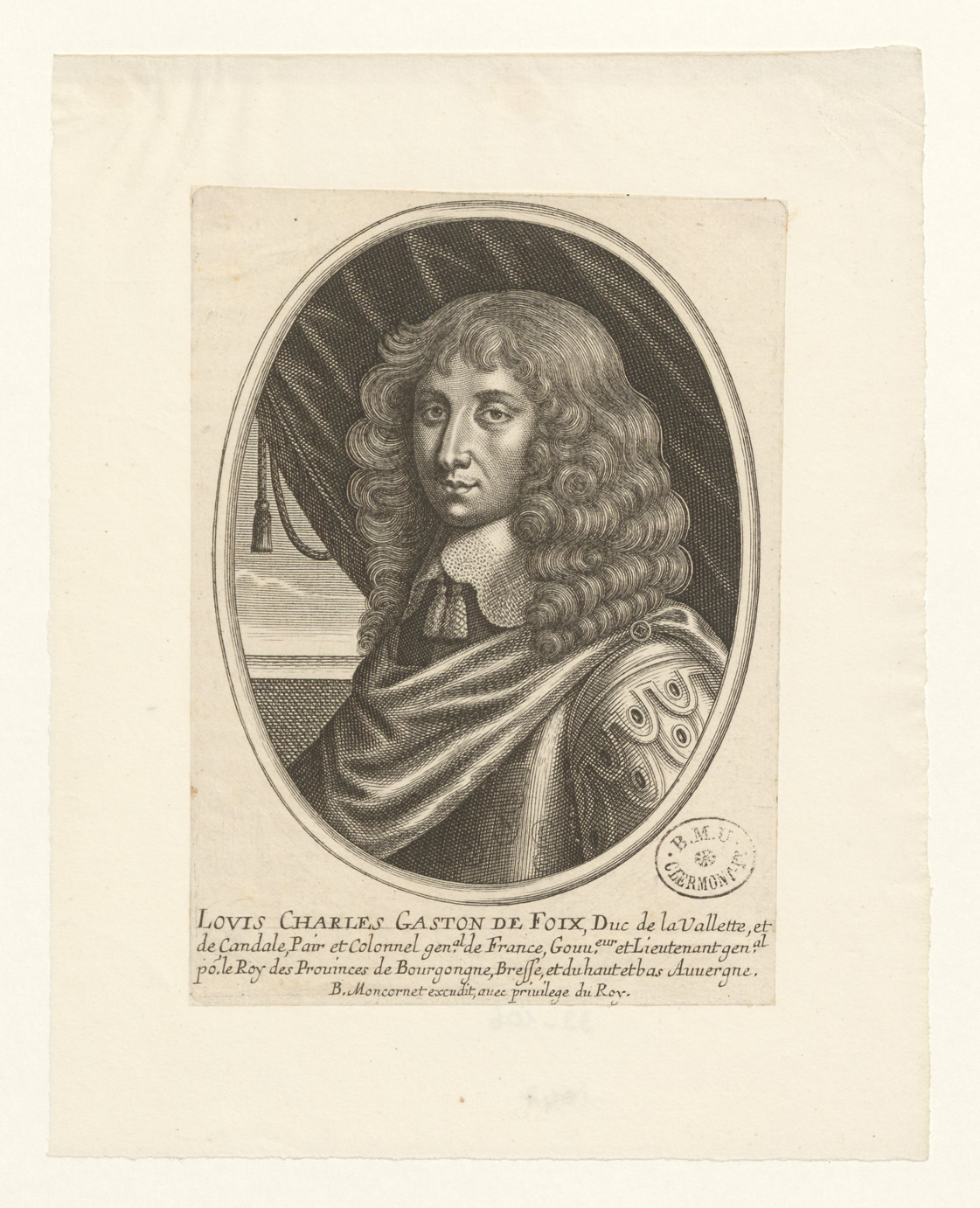
- Born: 14 April 1627; Metz
- Died: 28 January 1658 (aged 30); Lyon
- Father: Bernard de Nogaret de La Valette de Foix
- Mother: Gabrielle Angélique de Bourbon

Louis-Charles Gaston de Nogaret de la Valette de Foix, duke de La Vallette and Candale (14 April 1627 - 28 January 1658) was a French peer and Colonel General of the Infantry.

== Biography ==
He was born in Metz, the son of Bernard de Nogaret de La Valette de Foix (1592-1661), duke of Épernon, and Gabrielle Angélique de Bourbon (1603-1627), the illegitimate daughter of Henry IV of France. His mother died during his birth, with it rumored that his father had poisoned her.

In 1634, when Candale was about seven years old, his father remarried to Marie du Cambout de Coislin, daughter of Charles du Cambout, Marquis de Coislin, nephew of Cardinal Richelieu.

Candale had an older sister Louise-Anne-Christine, Mlle d'Epernon who became a Carmelite nun.

== Career ==
Candale came from a long line of military men, and he too would embark upon a similar path. Making a career for himself in the French military he attained the rank of lieutenant-general and was later made governor of Auvergne.

It was in his role as a governor in 1657 that he managed to make the Chevalier de Morville, son of Comte de Morville feel slighted. Morville one day happened upon Candale approached him sword in hand, and calling out to him to draw his own sword. The incident led to Morville's death and Candale's reputation was tarnished. Candale also quarreled with his cousin François de Vendôme, Duke of Beaufort.

Candale was considered one of the most handsome men at the French court because of his blonde hair and fine figure and also "for his wealth and magnificence".

== Personal life ==
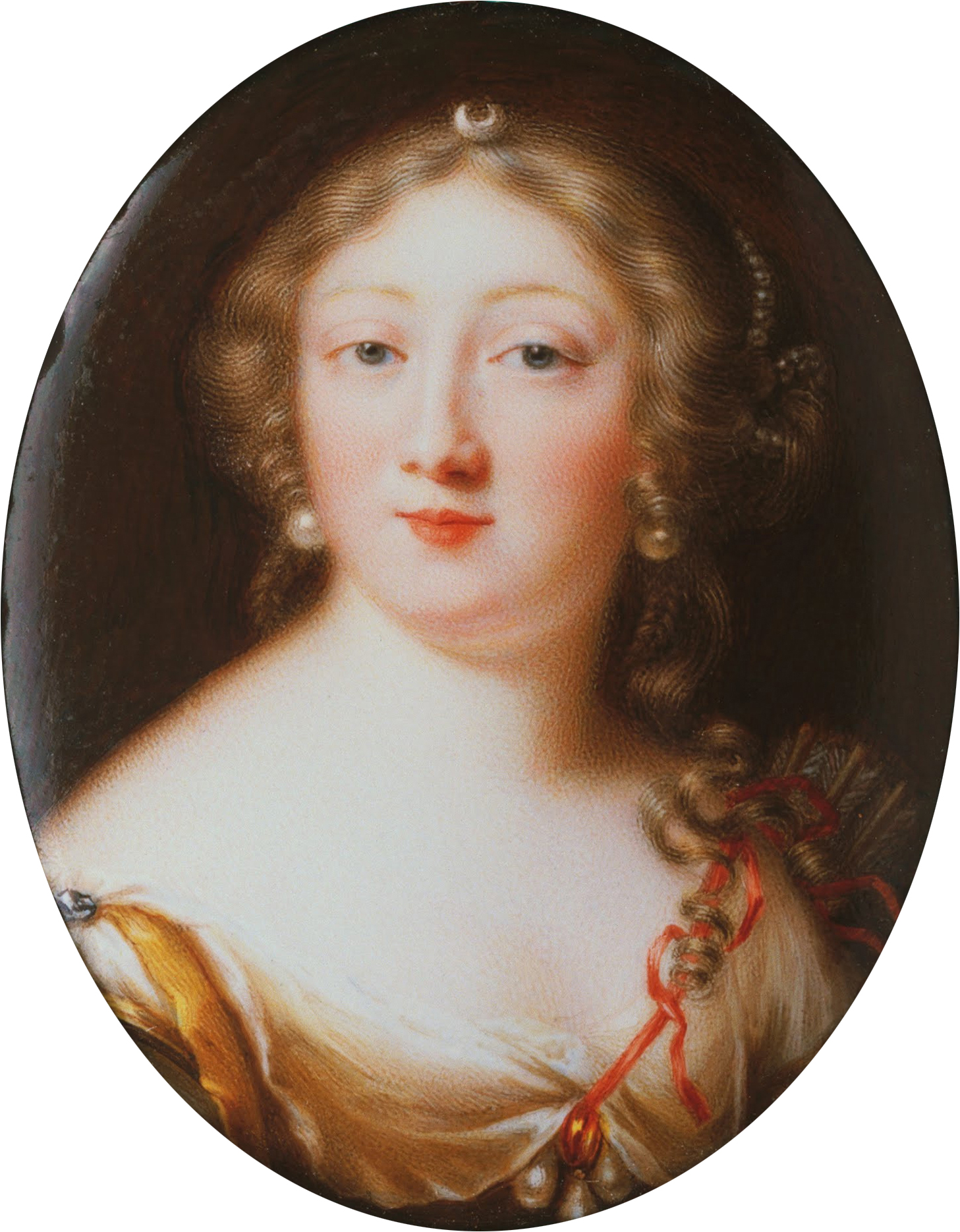
Portrait of Catherine-Henriette d'Angennes, Countess d'Olonne, as Diana by Jean Petiot

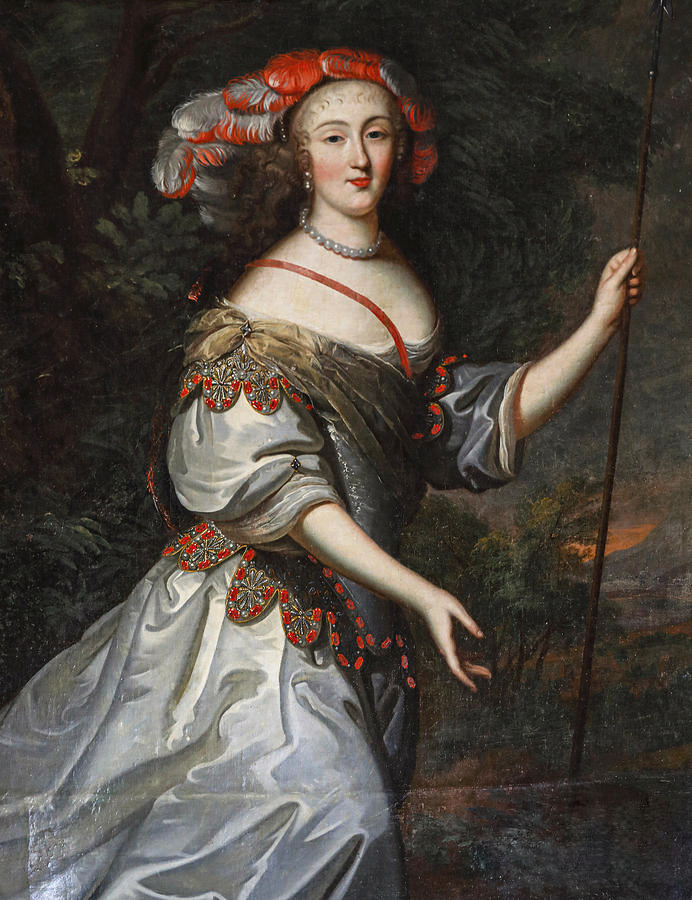
Portrait of Lucie de Tourville, duchess d'Humière

Around 1645, he entered into an affair with the nine year older Diane Chasteigner de la Roche-Posay, Madame de Saint-Loup. Diane who was described as "small but pretty and lively" and was rumored to be an illegitimate daughter of Cardinal Richelieu. At the time of Candale's affair with her she was the wife of the wealthy financier Nicolas Le Page.

The relationship lasted for six years until Candale became enamoured by Catherine-Henriette d'Angennes, comtesse d'Olonne, a prominent court beauty known for her many love intrigues. The comtesse was the wife of Louis de Trémoille, comte d'Olonne, though they were separated. Candale was also a rival with Monsieur Bartet for the affections of Lucie de Tourville de Cotantin, Marquise de Gouville.

Bartet a secretary employed by the count of Soissons said to people that if you took away Candale's "long hair, his long cannons, his long cuffs and his "mustaches", the duke would be nothing much.

Candale learnt of this and on June 1655, as Bartet was passing at ten o'clock in the morning through the rue Saint-Thomas du Louvre, Bartet was ambushed by eleven men on horseback, two of whom seized the reins of the horses of his carriage, two others brought the pistol to the throat of the coachman, and two threatened him with their pistols and daggers in their hands. The men then took out scissors, cut his hair, tore off his flap, the cannons (decorative frills on breeches) and his cuffs, and after that let him go. Bartet first believed that one of his enemies wanted to assassinate him, but then realized it was done on the orders of Candale.

Bartet publicly denied having ever insulted Candale, and said that the real cause of his quarrel came from both being in love with Madame de Gouville.

=== Marriage plans ===
The Duke of Candale was suggested a match with Anne-Marie Martinozzi, one of the many nieces of Cardinal Mazarin, but it met with opposition from his father the Duke d`Epernon who saw it as a mésalliance for his son. The young duke could claim royal ancestry as his mother Gabrielle-Angélique de Verneuil, was a legitimized daughter of Henry IV of France and his mistress Catherine Henriette de Balzac d'Entragues.

But despite being descended from the wealthy Foix family, which was among the oldest and wealthiest in France, and whose members had married into both the high nobility and royalty, the Duke d'Epernon's title was a relatively new creation, and he was ridiculed by his enemies as simple "notary's son".

The Duke d`Epernon demanded that if a marriage between Candale and Anne-Marie were to happen he and his son should be given the rank of prince étranger, which Cardinal Mazarin was either not willing or not able to do, so instead he chose to marry Anne-Marie to Armand de Bourbon.

Another marriage to one of the Mazarinettes was later suggested, this time to Laura Mancini but this marriage never materialized as Candale died.

== Death ==
Candale died from a "hepatetic flux" in 1658 at Lyon while returning to Paris from Catalonia, where he had been fighting in the Franco-Spanish war. He was buried in the chapel of the Cadillac-sur-Garonne castle.

As he was the only son, this ended the older line of the Valette family.
