= Charles de Valois =

Charles de Valois is the name of:

- Charles, Count of Valois (1270–1325)
- Charles I, Duke of Orléans (1394–1465), also count of Valois
- Charles of Valois, Duke of Berry (1446–1472), son of Charles VII, King of France and Marie of Anjou
- Charles II, Duke of Orléans (1522–1545)
- Charles de Valois, Duke of Angoulême (1573–1650), Duke of Angoulême
