= Gabrielle Angélique de Bourbon, Mademoiselle de Verneuil =

French courtier (1603–1627)

Gabrielle Angélique de Bourbon, Mademoiselle de Verneuil (1603–1627), was a French courtier.

She was the illegitimate daughter of king Henry IV of France and Catherine Henriette de Balzac d'Entragues, and a sister of Gaston Henri de Bourbon. She was officially acknowledged by her father the king, and raised with her legitimate and illegitimate siblings and half siblings in the Royal Nursery under the supervision of the Governess of the Children of France, Françoise de Montglat. Her brother was given the title Duke de Verneuil and she was given the title Mademoiselle de Verneuil.

Her father died in 1610. When her half-brother king Louis XIII married Anne of Austria in 1615, she was appointed lady-in-waiting to her sister-in-law the queen. Initially, the queen isolated herself with her Spanish courtiers. When the Spanish retinue was sent back to Spain in 1618, the queen became closer to her French courtiers, and Marie de Rohan and Mademoiselle de Verneuil became two of her intimate friends. de Verneuil is credited with having made queen Anne more easygoing and relaxed, and with having introduced her to the French court culture with her lively and playful personality.

In 1622, Marie de Rohan and Mademoiselle de Verneuil were blamed of having caused the queen to have a miscarriage during one of their playful games, and they were both discharged and forced to leave court without saying goodbye to Anne.

Mademoiselle de Verneuil married the same year to Bernard de Nogaret de La Valette d'Épernon, and became the mother of Louis-Charles de Nogaret de Foix. Like Marie de Rohan, she was eventually allowed to return to court and resume her friendship with Anne of Austria, and was often seen in her company. She died in 1627. She was rumoured to have been poisoned by her husband.
