= Creil =

- Commune
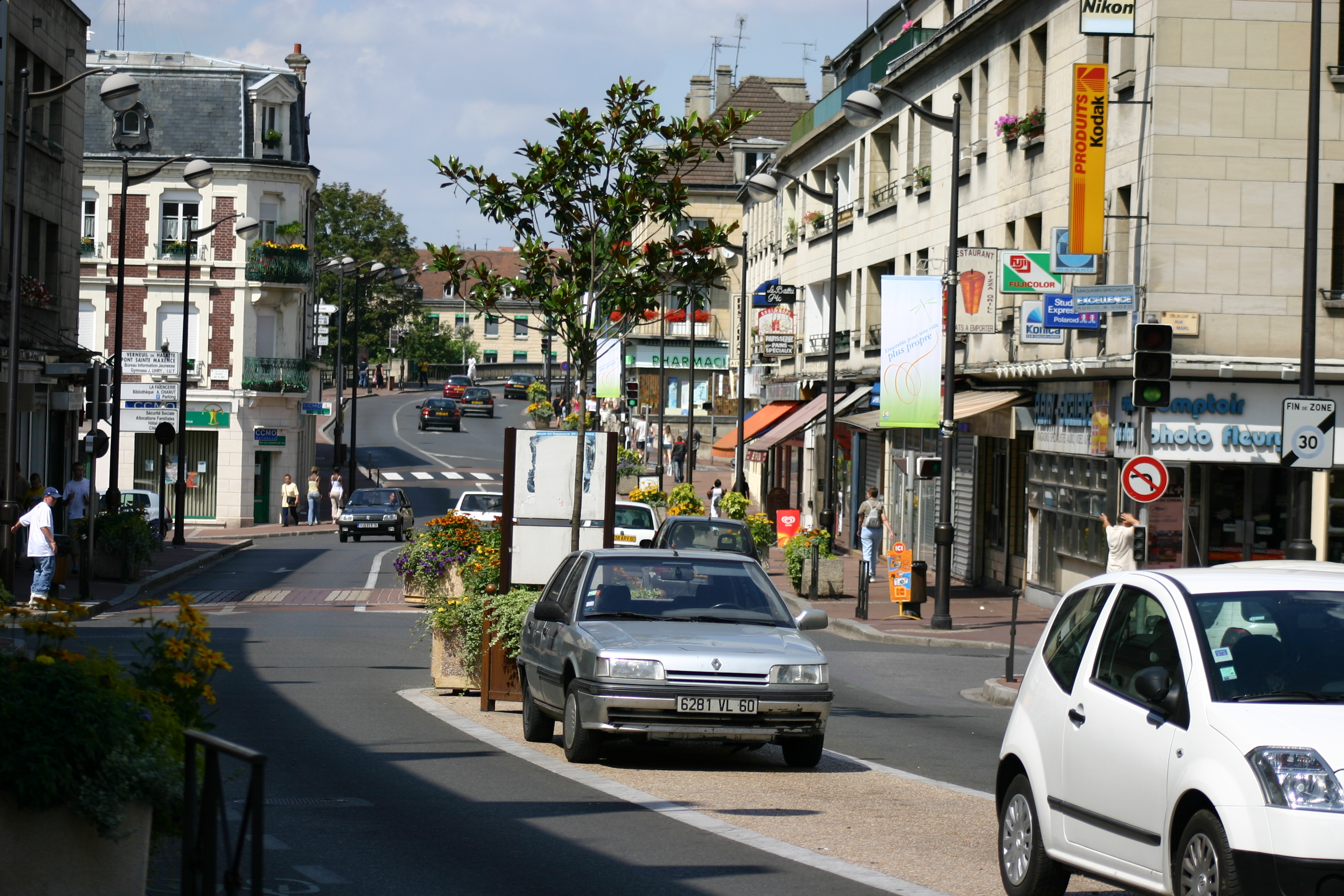
- Quartier St-Médard

- Coat of arms
- Location of Creil
- Location within France Location within Hauts-de-France
- Coordinates: 49°15′30″N 2°29′00″E
- Country: France
- Region: Hauts-de-France
- Department: Oise
- Arrondissement: Senlis
- Canton: Creil
- Intercommunality: CA Creil Sud Oise

Government
  - Mayor (2026–32): Omar Yaqoob
- Area^{1}: 11.09 km^{2} (4.28 sq mi)
- Highest elevation: 129 m (423 ft)
- Lowest elevation: 26 m (85 ft)
- Population (2023): 36,301
  - Density: 3,273/km^{2} (8,478/sq mi)
- Time zone: UTC+01:00 (CET)
  - Summer (DST): UTC+02:00 (CEST)
- INSEE/Postal code: 60175 /60100
- ^{1} French Land Register data, which excludes lakes, ponds, glaciers > 1 km^{2} (0.386 sq mi or 247 acres) and river estuaries.

Creil (French pronunciation: [kʁɛj]) is a commune in the Oise department, northern France. The Creil station is an important railway junction.

== History ==
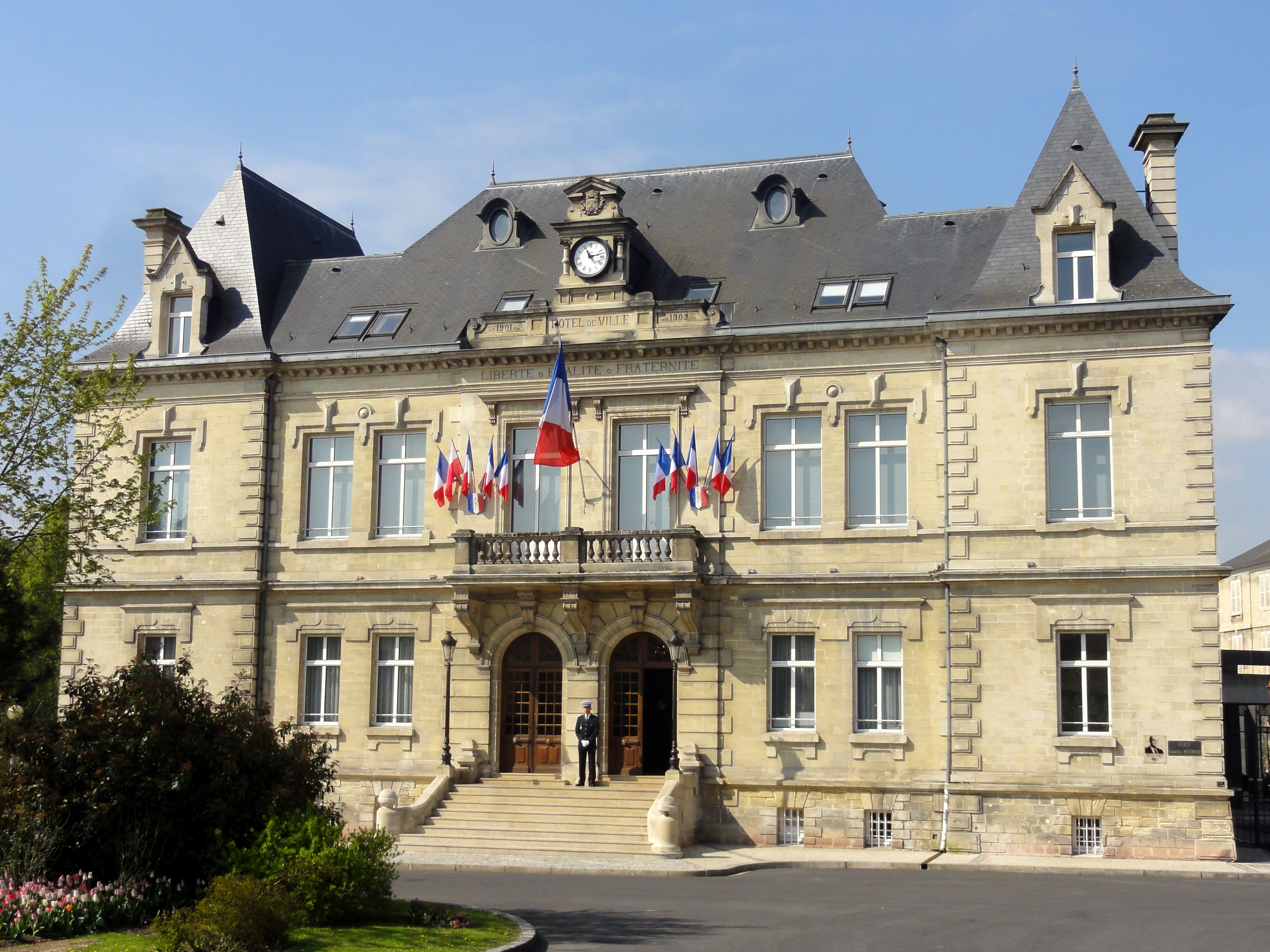
The Hôtel de Ville

Archaeological remains in the area include a Neolithic site as well as a late Iron Age necropolis, perhaps belonging to a Gaulish fortress or protected camp.

The city itself is mentioned for the first time as "Criolio" in a 635 AD document.

Creil played a part of some importance in the wars of the 14th, 15th and 16th centuries.

The Château de Creil dates from the 10th century. The Hôtel de Ville was completed in 1903.

== Population ==
Historical population

Year	Pop.	±% p.a.
1793	976	—
1800	1,000	+0.35%
1806	1,196	+3.03%
1821	1,329	+0.71%
1831	1,550	+1.55%
1836	1,690	+1.74%
1841	1,790	+1.16%
1846	2,223	+4.43%
1851	2,656	+3.62%
1856	3,181	+3.67%
1861	3,626	+2.65%
1866	4,539	+4.59%
1872	4,998	+1.62%
1876	5,737	+3.51%
1881	7,182	+4.60%
1886	7,418	+0.65%
1891	8,183	+1.98%
1896	8,456	+0.66%
1901	9,125	+1.53%

Year	Pop.	±% p.a.
1906	9,272	+0.32%
1911	10,214	+1.95%
1921	10,359	+0.14%
1926	10,558	+0.38%
1931	10,768	+0.39%
1936	10,899	+0.24%
1946	10,024	−0.83%
1954	13,500	+3.79%
1962	19,235	+4.52%
1968	32,544	+9.16%
1975	32,509	−0.02%
1982	34,709	+0.94%
1990	31,956	−1.03%
1999	30,675	−0.45%
2007	33,837	+1.23%
2012	33,936	+0.06%
2017	35,657	+0.99%
2023	36,301	+0.30%

Source: EHESS and INSEE (1968-2023)

== International relations ==
Creil is twinned with:

- Marl, Germany
- Pendle, England, United Kingdom
- Chorzów, Poland
- (Palestine) Bethlehem, Palestinian Territories
- Nabadji Civol, Senegal
- Ouro Sogui, Senegal
- Nefta, Tunisia
- Dakhla, Western Sahara

== Personalities ==
- Houssen Abderrahmane, footballer
- Simon Banza, footballer
- Jean-François Christophe, footballer
- Fabé Dia, athlete
- Michel Chion, French film theorist and composer of experimental music
- Steve Furtado, footballer
- Helene Geoffroy, politician
- Keblack, rapper
- Lynel Kitambala, footballer
- Louis-Gabriel Le Brun, French engineer
- Johann Lion, former footballer
- Paccelis Morlende, basketball player
- Rédoine Faïd, famous criminal

== Climate ==
Creil has an Oceanic climate (Cfb) according to the Köppen climate classification.

Climate data for Creil (1991–2020 normals, extremes 1954–present)
Month	Jan	Feb	Mar	Apr	May	Jun	Jul	Aug	Sep	Oct	Nov	Dec	Year
Record high °C (°F)	15.9 (60.6)	21.4 (70.5)	25.4 (77.7)	28.0 (82.4)	31.7 (89.1)	36.4 (97.5)	41.6 (106.9)	39.3 (102.7)	35.3 (95.5)	28.3 (82.9)	20.7 (69.3)	16.9 (62.4)	41.6 (106.9)
Mean daily maximum °C (°F)	6.8 (44.2)	8.0 (46.4)	12.0 (53.6)	15.6 (60.1)	19.0 (66.2)	22.4 (72.3)	24.9 (76.8)	24.8 (76.6)	20.9 (69.6)	15.9 (60.6)	10.5 (50.9)	7.2 (45.0)	15.7 (60.3)
Daily mean °C (°F)	4.1 (39.4)	4.6 (40.3)	7.5 (45.5)	10.3 (50.5)	13.7 (56.7)	16.9 (62.4)	19.2 (66.6)	19.0 (66.2)	15.6 (60.1)	11.9 (53.4)	7.4 (45.3)	4.5 (40.1)	11.2 (52.2)
Mean daily minimum °C (°F)	1.4 (34.5)	1.2 (34.2)	3.1 (37.6)	4.9 (40.8)	8.4 (47.1)	11.4 (52.5)	13.4 (56.1)	13.2 (55.8)	10.3 (50.5)	7.8 (46.0)	4.3 (39.7)	1.9 (35.4)	6.8 (44.2)
Record low °C (°F)	−21.6 (−6.9)	−18.5 (−1.3)	−11.4 (11.5)	−5.3 (22.5)	−2.6 (27.3)	0.7 (33.3)	3.5 (38.3)	3.2 (37.8)	−0.6 (30.9)	−5.0 (23.0)	−11.3 (11.7)	−16.7 (1.9)	−21.6 (−6.9)
Average precipitation mm (inches)	56.2 (2.21)	47.1 (1.85)	48.2 (1.90)	45.2 (1.78)	60.0 (2.36)	56.0 (2.20)	56.0 (2.20)	57.6 (2.27)	45.0 (1.77)	61.1 (2.41)	59.2 (2.33)	70.6 (2.78)	662.2 (26.07)
Average precipitation days (≥ 1.0 mm)	11.1	9.9	9.5	9.0	9.8	9.0	8.4	8.7	8.2	10.5	10.7	12.7	117.6
Source: Meteociel

== Politics ==
=== Administrative and electoral affiliations ===
==== Administrative ties ====
The commune is located in the Senlis district of the Oise department.

From 1793 to 1973, it was the capital of the canton of Creil, the year in which the town was divided between the cantons of Creil-Nogent-sur-Oise (which included the districts of the right bank and the communes of Nogent-sur-Oise and Villers-Saint-Paul ) and Creil-Sud (which covered all the districts of the left bank). As part of the 2014 canton redistricting in France, this territorial administrative constituency disappeared, and the canton is now only an electoral constituency.

==== Electoral affiliations ====
For departmental elections, the town has been the central office for the new canton of Creil since 2014, made up of only two communes, the other being Verneuil-en-Halatte. For the election of deputies, the city is divided between the third constituency of Oise (former canton of Creil-Sud ) and the seventh constituency of Oise .

=== Inter-commune relations ===
Creil was the seat of the Creil agglomeration community (CAC), created at the end of 2001, which included 4 communes

=== Political trends and results ===
The commune of Creil is marked by a left-wing and particularly socialist leaning based on electoral results. Thus, in the 2007 presidential electio, Ségolène Royal obtained a vote share of 38.20% in the first round against 22.20% for Nicolas Sarkozy while no other left-wing candidate exceeded 5% and the socialist candidate obtained 60.5% in the second round. On the other hand, there is a difference between the two electoral constituencies which share the commune, with a more right-wing tendency for the western districts. In the 2007 legislative elections, in the 3rd constituency, the socialist candidate received 33.23% of the vote in the first round and 60.46% in the second round. On the other hand, in the 7th constituency, the UMP candidate, elected in the first round by the entire constituency, obtained 37.12% of the votes in the commune against 24.12% for the socialist candidate.

== See also ==
- Communes of the Oise department
