= Marie-Charlotte de Balzac d'Entragues =

French noble

Marie-Charlotte de Balzac d'Entragues (c. 1588–1664), was a French noblewoman. She was the mistress to Henry IV of France in 1605-1609. She was the daughter of Charles Balzac d'Entragues and Marie Touchet, who was formerly the sole mistress of Charles IX of France, and the sister of Catherine Henriette de Balzac d'Entragues, also mistress of Henry IV.
