= Françoise de Montmorency-Fosseux =

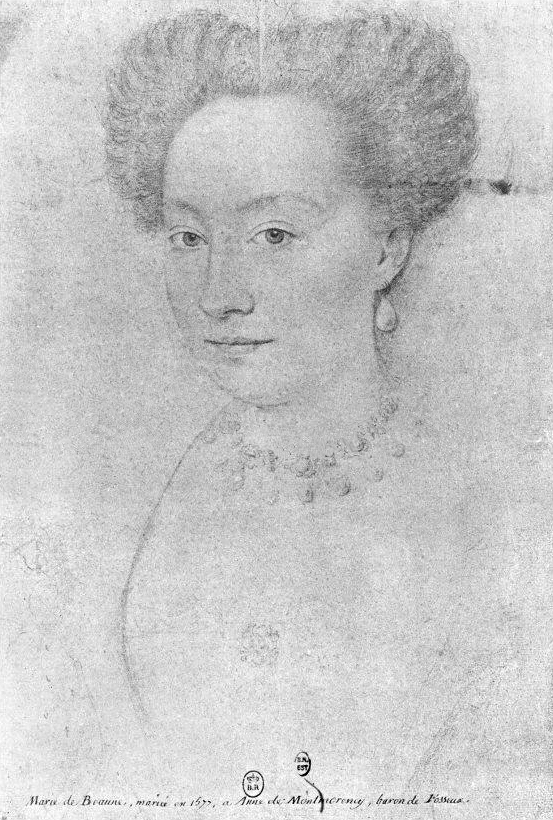
La Belle Fosseuse by François Quesnel

Françoise de Montmorency-Fosseux (French pronunciation: [fʁɑ̃swaz də mɔ̃mɔʁɑ̃si fosø]; 1566 – 6 December 1614), also called "La Belle Fosseuse" or "La Fosseuse", was mistress to King Henry III of Navarre (future King Henry IV of France) from 1579 to 1581.

== Biography ==
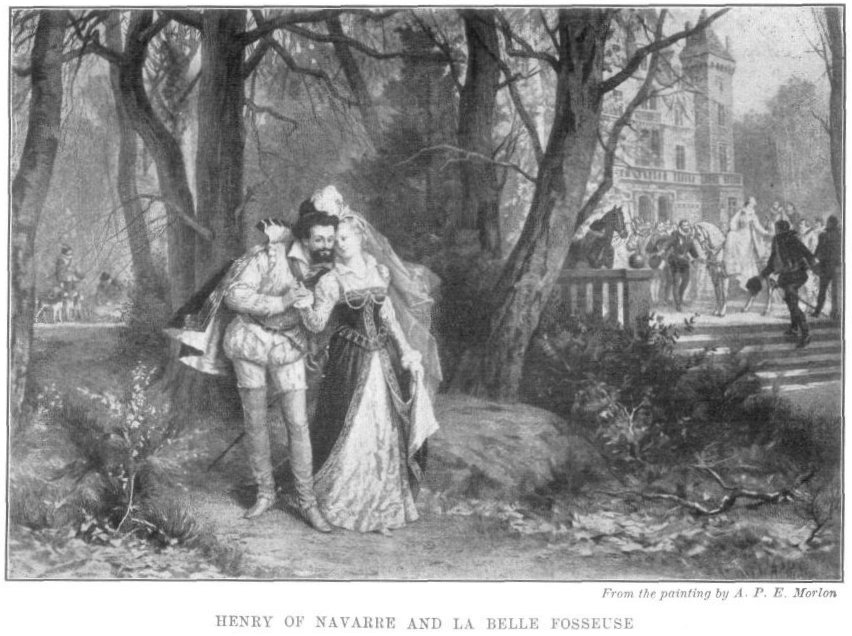
Henri IV and La Belle Fosseuse after a painting by Antony Paul Emile Morlon

Françoise de Montmorency-Fosseux was the youngest of five daughters born to Pierre de Montmorency-Fossuex. At age fourteen, she became lady-in-waiting to Queen Margaret of Valois. A shy and blushing girl, she caught the attentions of Henry III of Navarre. He called her "ma fille" and plied her with cakes, pastries, and rosewater sweets. She finally gave in to his advances during a voyage to Montauban, and afterwards grew ambitious and arrogant towards Queen Margaret, carrying on the affair in hopes of marriage. She eventually became pregnant, and with the prospect of bearing the child of a king, came to consider herself queen. Wary of gossip, however, she and Henry fled court at Nérac for Eaux-Chaudes from 7 to 25 June 1581. Margaret traveled with them as far as Bagnères de Bigorre. Margaret proposed banishing her rival from court, but La Fosseuse screamed that she would refuse to cooperate.

Françoise finally gave birth to a daughter, but the child was stillborn. The doctor informed Henry, and Margaret made sure the lying-in proceeded as discreetly as possible by acting as midwife. Margaret was then invited by her mother Catherine de' Medici to Paris, along with her ladies-in-waiting, including Françoise. Catherine advised her daughter to return Françoise to her own parents. Following this counsel, Margaret chased La Fosseuse from court in 1582. Henry took this as a personal insult, but did nothing to retaliate, as he had then fallen to the charms of "the beautiful Corisande," Diane d'Andoins.

On 11 March 1596, Françoise de Montmorency-Fosseux married François de Broc, Baron of Cinq-Mars. At her death in 1614, she was buried in the church at Broc.

== See also ==
- Henry IV of France's wives and mistresses
- List of French royal mistresses

== Sources ==
- Delorme, Philippe (2010). Henri IV: les réalités d'un mythe (in French). L'Archipel.
- Pitts, Vincent J. (2009). Henri IV of France: His Reign and Age. Johns Hopkins University Press.
- Wellman, Kathleen (2013). Queens and Mistresses of Renaissance France. Yale University Press.
