= Château de Creil =

Château in Creil, France

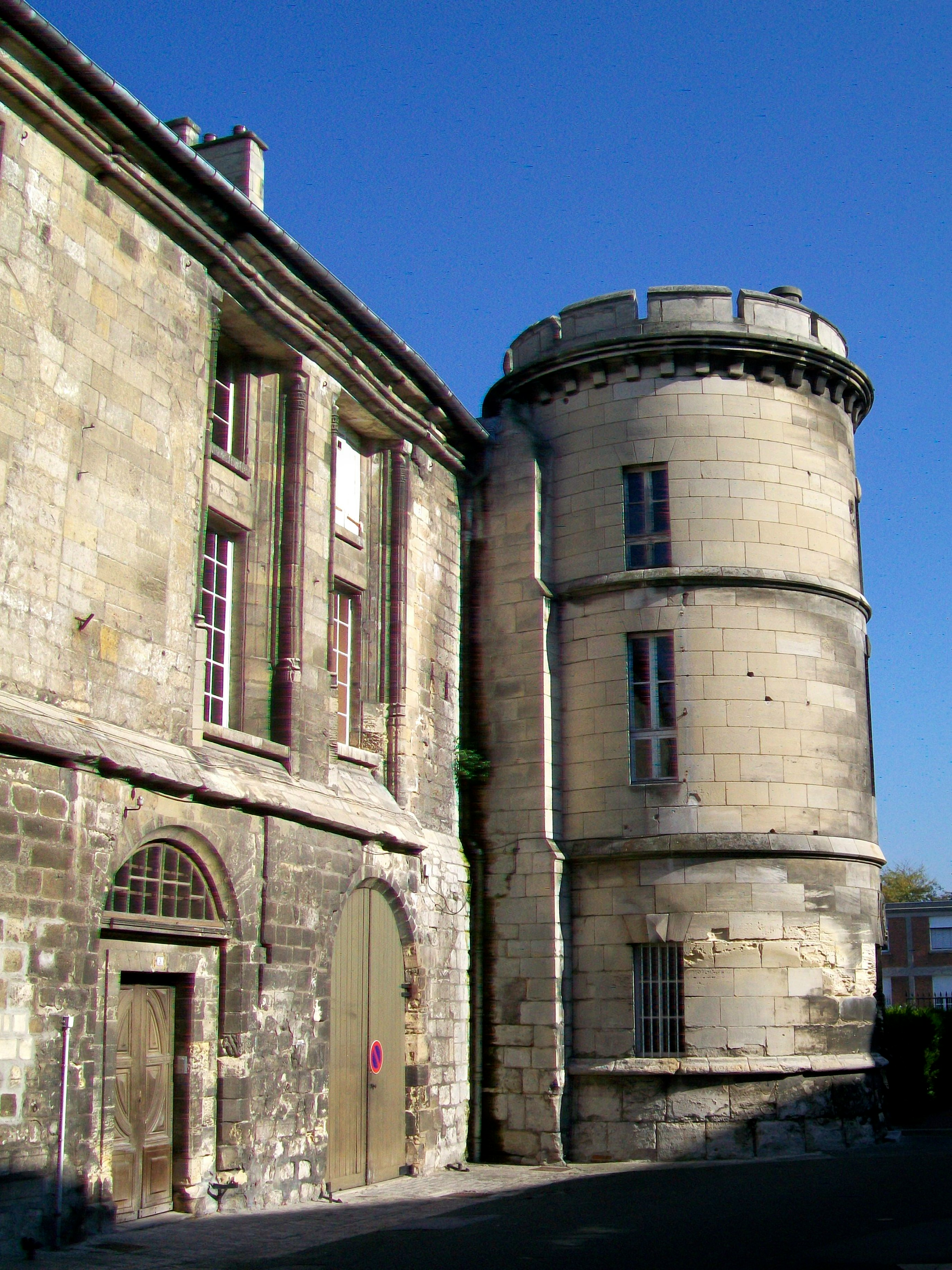
- The surviving northeast tower in September 2011
- Interactive map of the Château de Creil area

General information
- Type: Château
- Architectural style: Medieval style
- Location: Creil, France
- Coordinates: 49°15′39″N 2°28′22″E
- Completed: C.1540

Design and construction
- Architect: Jacques I Androuet du Cerceau

The Château de Creil is an ancient fortified castle and a former royal residence located in Creil in the Oise department of the Hauts-de-France region of France. Only one tower remains. It was designated a monument historique by the French government in 1923.

== History ==
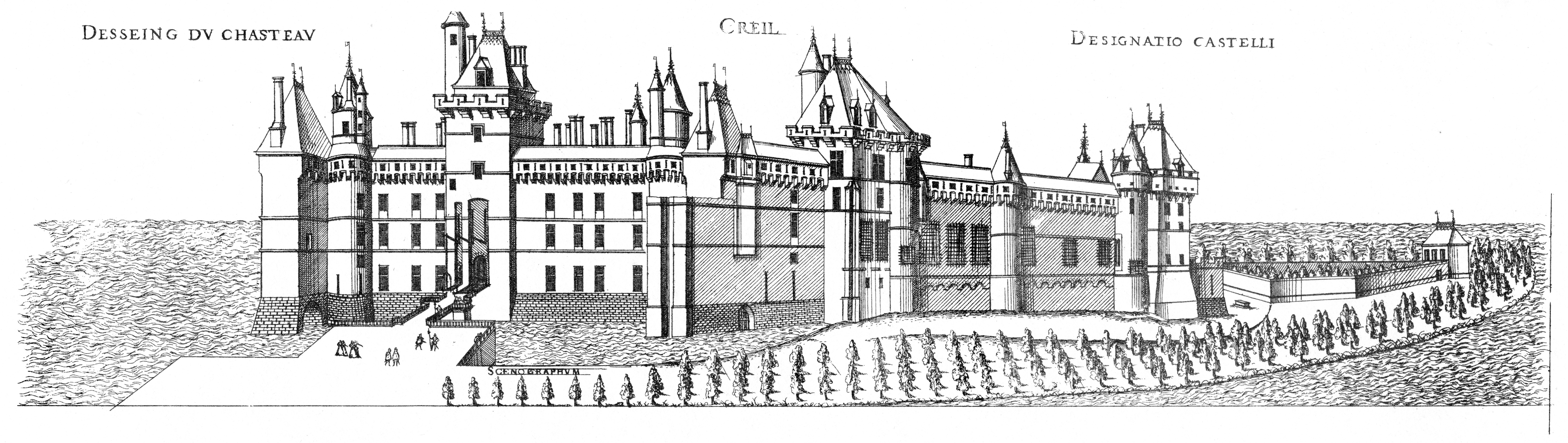
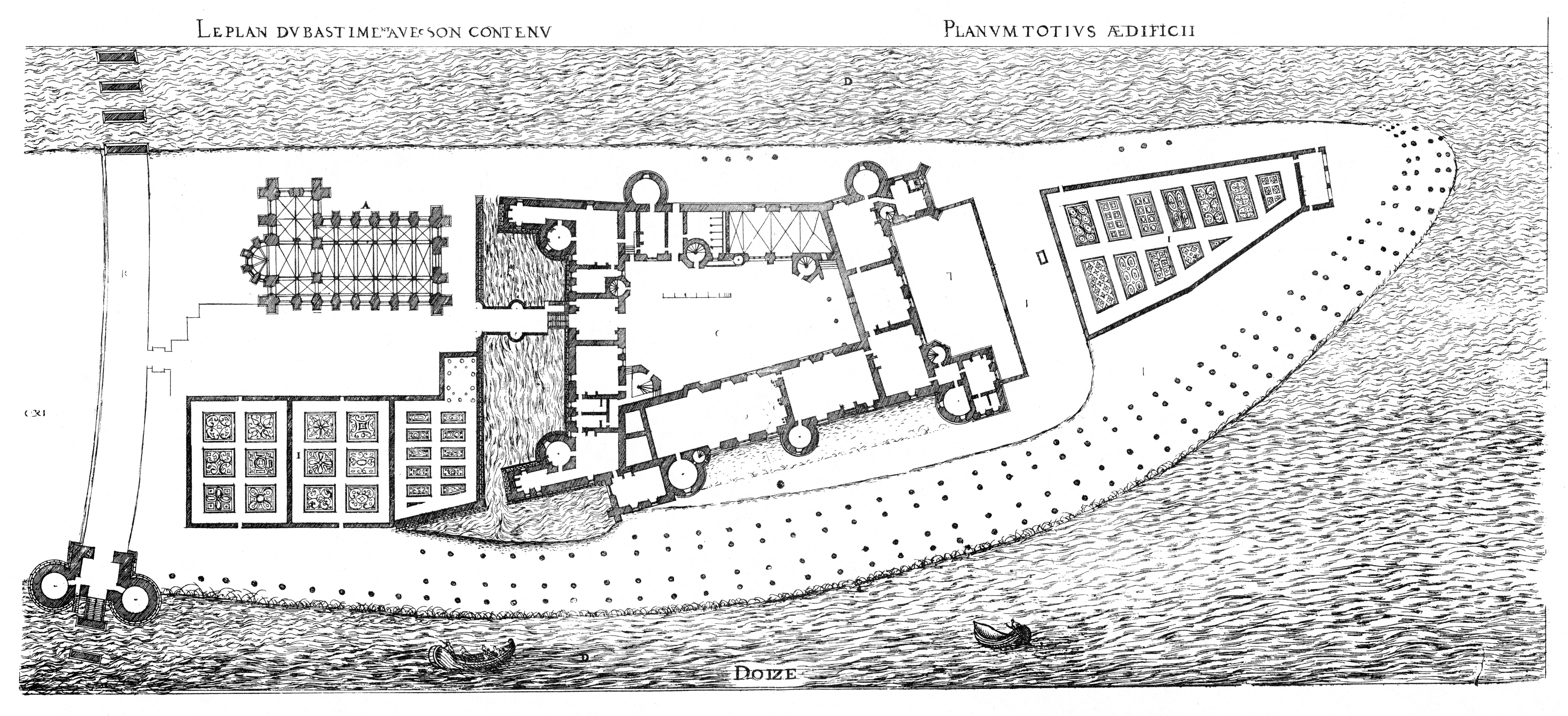
The building in 1576

In the 10th century, the lords of Senlis are recorded as having a fortified residence on the island of Saint-Maurice. It was held by the Counts of Clermont until 1218 when it was acquired by Philip II of France. The castle was given to Louis I, Duke of Bourbon in 1269 and Charles IV of France was born there in 1294.

The English-garrisoned town and castle was besieged on 8 May 1441 by an army led by King Charles VII of France and a force of heavy artillery led by Jean Bureau. After two weeks the French artillery breached the walls. The garrison, led by Sir William Peyto, sallied out on 24 May but were unable to break the siege. They surrendered the town and castle the next day and retreated into Normandy.

After being absorbed in the royal domain by Charles V of France in the mid-14th century, it remain in state ownership until Francis I of France gave it to Marguerite de Navarre. She had it rebuilt to a design by Jacques I Androuet du Cerceau in around 1540. It was listed at that time as one of "les plus excellent bâtiments de France" (the best buildings in France). It was described as "il est d'assez grand monstre, mais un peu obscur par dedans" (quite large, but a little dark inside).

After being neglected in the 17th and 18th centuries, the southeast part of the building was put to municipal use in the 19th century. The municipal buildings were built around the southeast tower, with the town hall to the west and the fire station to the east. The southeast tower itself contained a police station and two cells on the ground floor and a magistrate's office on the first floor.

Proposals to refurbish the southeast tower were considered in 1895, but, after some debate, it was demolished in 1901 to make way for the new Hôtel de Ville, which was completed in 1903. In 1930, the surviving northeast tower, together with an adjacent residential building dating from 1788, were converted for use as the Musée Gallé-Juillet (Gallé-Juillet Museum). The northeast tower was restored in 2018.

== Sources ==
- Barker, Juliet R. V. (2010). Conquest : the English kingdom of France in the Hundred Years War. London: Abacus. ISBN 978-0-349-12202-1.
- Brown, Elizabeth A. R. (1987). The Prince is Father of the King: The Character and Childhood of Philip the Fair of France. Vol. 49. Mediaeval Studies. pp. 282–334. ISSN 0076-5872.
- Hayot, Denis (2022). L'architecture fortifiée capétienne au XIIIe siècle - Un paradigme à l'échelle du royaume: Monographies Picardie, Artois, Flandre, Chagny. Centre de castellologie de Bourgogne. ISBN 979-10-95034-23-0.
- Lambert, Émile (1982). Dictionnaire topographique du département de l'Oise, Amiens, Musée de Picardie. la Société de Linguistique Picarde.
