= Verneuil-en-Halatte =

- Commune
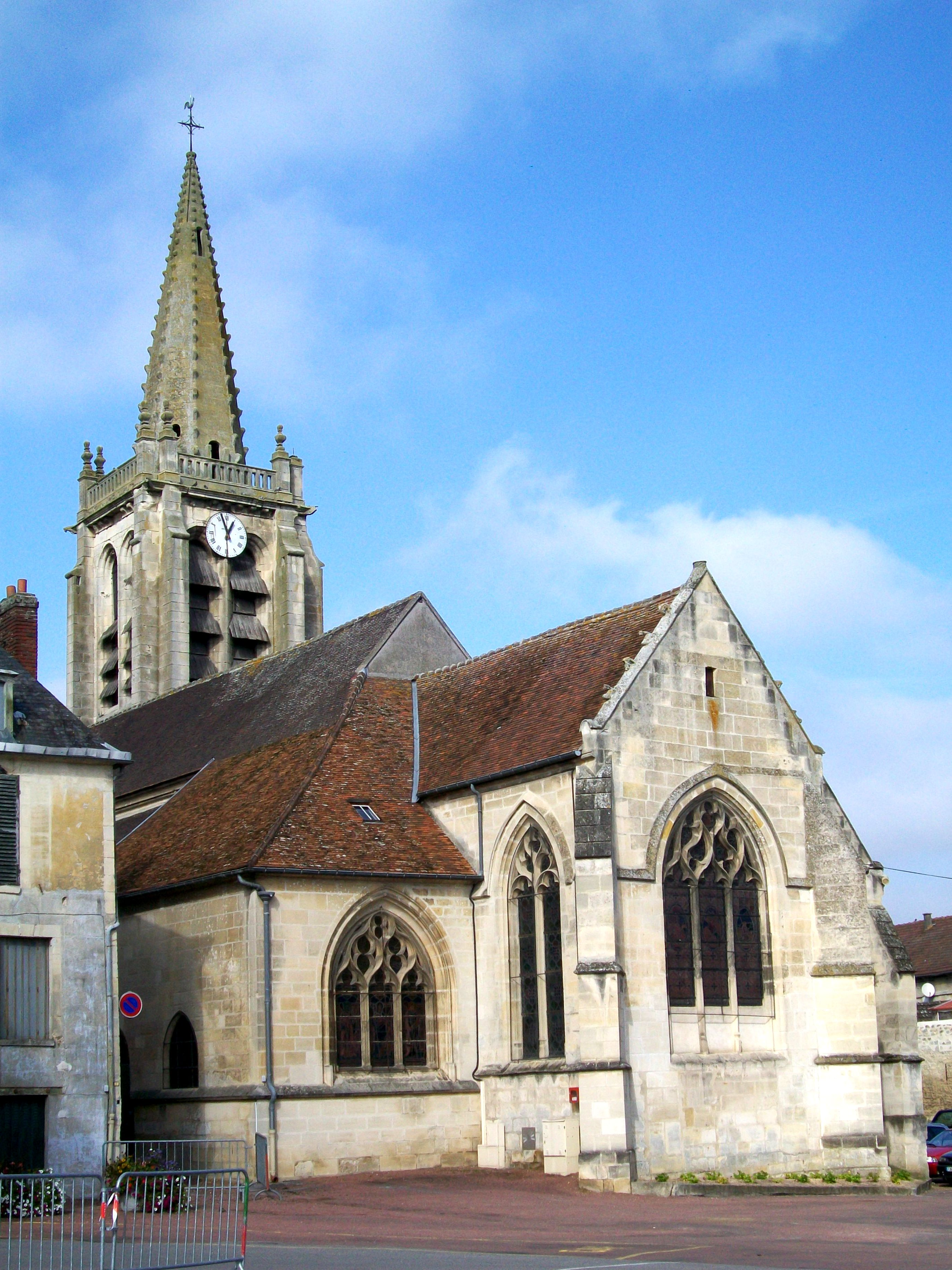
- The church in Verneuil-en-Halatte

- Coat of arms
- Location of Verneuil-en-Halatte
- Location within France Location within Hauts-de-France
- Coordinates: 49°16′38″N 2°31′23″E
- Country: France
- Region: Hauts-de-France
- Department: Oise
- Arrondissement: Senlis
- Canton: Creil
- Intercommunality: CC Pays d'Oise et d'Halatte

Government
  - Mayor (2020–2026): Philippe Kellner
- Area^{1}: 22.26 km^{2} (8.59 sq mi)
- Highest elevation: 108 m (354 ft)
- Lowest elevation: 25 m (82 ft)
- Population (2023): 4,775
  - Density: 214.5/km^{2} (555.6/sq mi)
- Time zone: UTC+01:00 (CET)
  - Summer (DST): UTC+02:00 (CEST)
- INSEE/Postal code: 60670 /60550
- ^{1} French Land Register data, which excludes lakes, ponds, glaciers > 1 km^{2} (0.386 sq mi or 247 acres) and river estuaries.

Verneuil-en-Halatte (French pronunciation: [vɛʁnœj ɑ̃.n‿alat], literally Verneuil in Halatte) is a commune in the Oise department in northern France. The organist and composer Joseph Boulnois (1884–1918) was born in Verneuil-en-Halatte.

== History ==
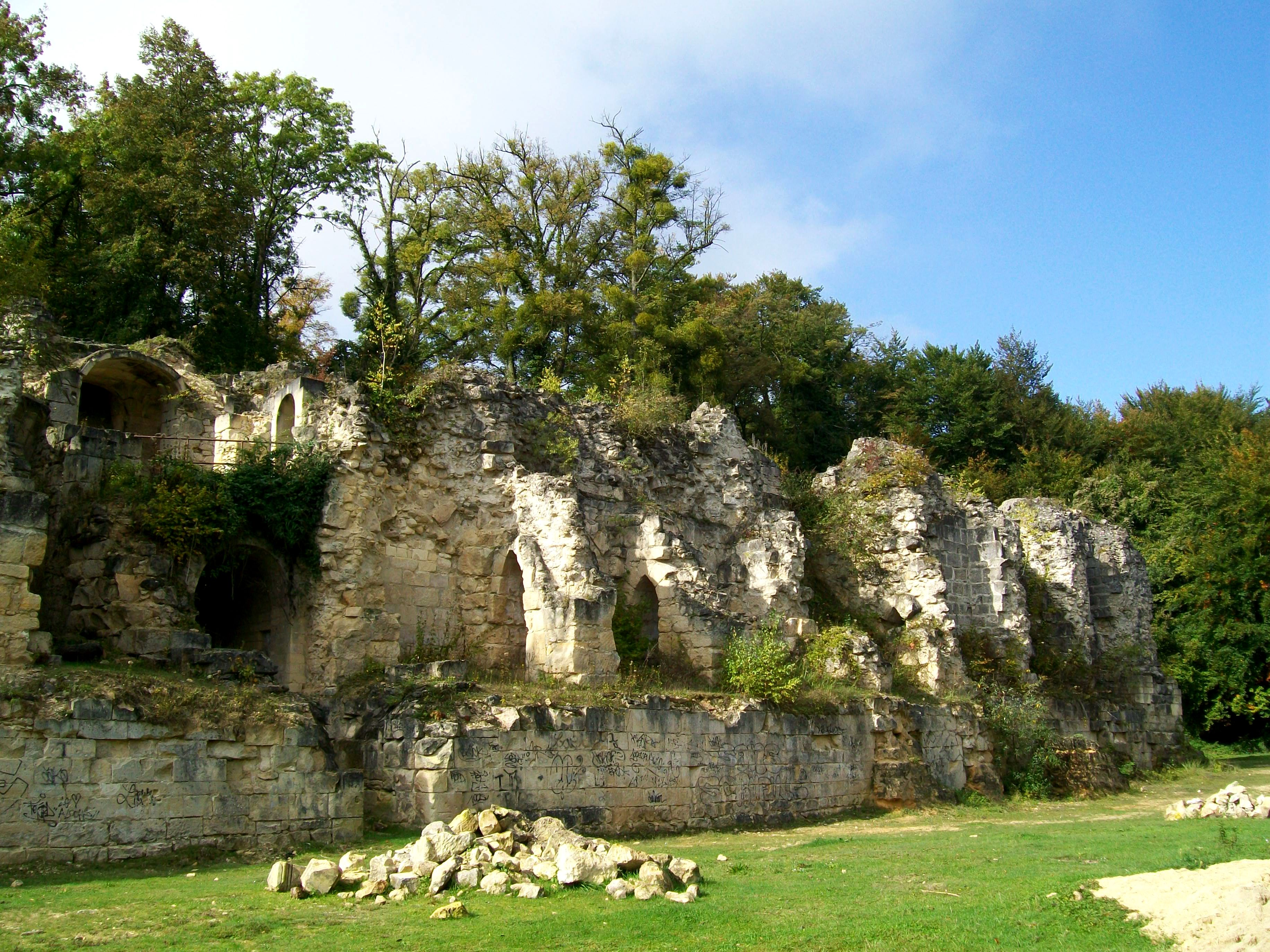
The unrecognisable facade of the castle today

Verneuil was originally a Seigneury. Philippe IV de Boulainvilliers, Seigneur of Verneuil, started the construction of a castle in 1558, but fell short of funds and ended up selling the unfinished castle to Jacques, Duke of Nemours in 1575. He continued the construction but work stopped again after his death in 1585. The castle was finally sold to king Henry IV in 1599, who offered it to his mistress Catherine Henriette de Balzac d'Entragues, raising the grounds to a marquisate and thus making her the Marquise de Verneuil en Beauvoisis.

Upon the death of the Marquise (1633), the castle came into the hands of her son, Henri, Duke of Verneuil. The grounds were raised again to a duchy-peerage by king Louis XIV in 1652, granting Henri the title of Duke of Verneuil. He kept the castle until his death in 1682, after it was passed on to his widow, Charlotte Séguier. Upon her death, it was sold to Henri Jules, Prince of Condé. His successor, Louis Henri, Duke of Bourbon, no longer made use of the castle, causing it to fall into decay. Maintenance to the grounds was finally stopped in 1724 and the pillaging of the castle started around 1734, with stone being recovered for improving the Château de Chantilly.

== Population ==
Historical population
Year	Pop.	±% p.a.
1968	2,587	—
1975	2,560	−0.15%
1982	3,463	+4.41%
1990	3,614	+0.53%
1999	4,037	+1.24%
2007	4,398	+1.08%
2012	4,676	+1.23%
2017	4,650	−0.11%
2023	4,775	+0.44%
Source: INSEE

== See also ==
- Communes of the Oise department
- Henri, Duke of Verneuil
