= Johann Lion =

French footballer (born 1972)

Personal information
- Full name: Johann Lion
- Date of birth: 4 March 1972 (age 54)
- Place of birth: Creil, France
- Height: 1.74 m (5 ft 9 in)
- Position: Midfielder

Senior career*
Years	Team	Apps	(Gls)
1993–1996	AS Nancy	29	(1)
1996–1998	ES Troyes AC	60	(0)
1998–2001	Vendée Fontenay Foot	62	(4)
- * Club domestic league appearances and goals

Johann Lion (born 4 March 1972) is a French former professional footballer who played as a midfielder.
