= Henri, Duke of Verneuil =

17th Century Bishop of Metz and Duke of Verneuil

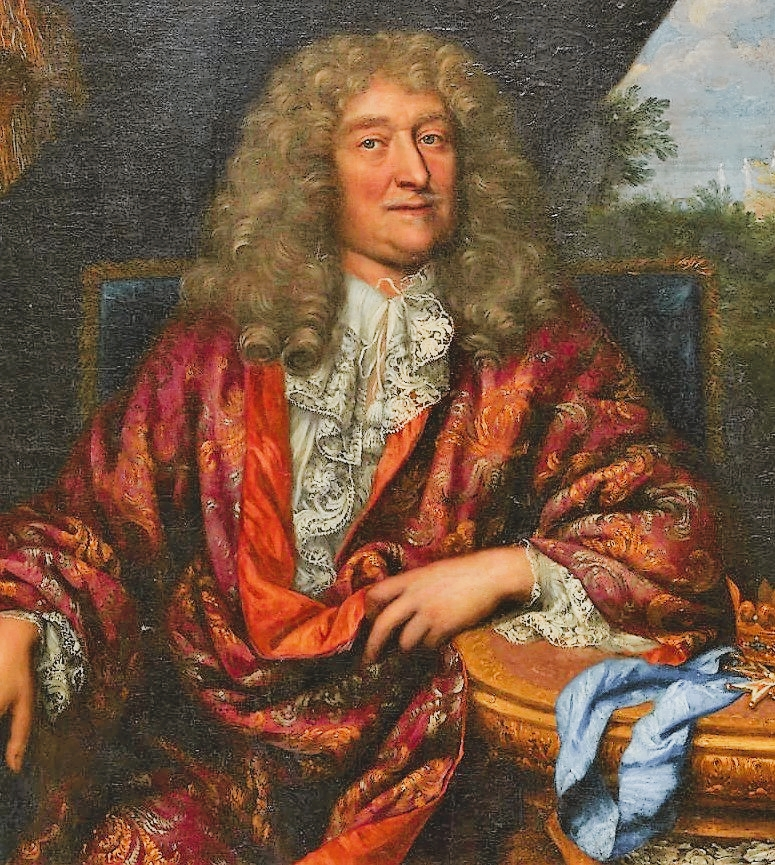

Bishop of Metz
- In office 1612–1652

Duke of Verneuil
- In office 1663–1682

Personal details
- Born: 3 November 1601 Château de Vincennes
- Died: 28 May 1682 (aged 80)
- Parents: Henry IV of France (father); Catherine Henriette de Balzac d'Entragues (mother)

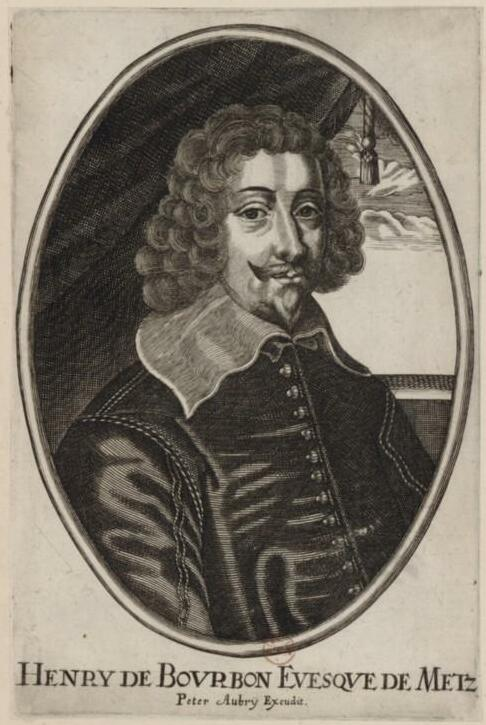
Portrait as bishop

Gaston Henri de Bourbon, Duke of Verneuil (3 November 1601 – 28 May 1682), was an illegitimate son of Henri IV of France. He was the bishop of Metz from 1612 to 1652, despite not being ordained. In his early 50s he was displaced and had a career as a diplomat.

== Biography ==
Henri was born in the Château de Vincennes on 3 November 1601, the illegitimate son of King Henry IV of France and his mistress, Catherine Henriette de Balzac d'Entragues. He was declared legitimate in 1603, at the age of two.

His sister was Gabrielle Angelique, called Mlle de Verneuil (1603–1627), married Bernard de Nogaret de La Valette. His half-siblings included King Louis XIII, Christine of France, Duchess of Savoy and César, Duke of Vendôme.

The bishopric of Metz was intended for him from infancy, but when Bishop Charles of Lorraine died in 1607, Pope Paul V refused to appoint a young child of seven. The House of Lorraine had controlled the see since 1484, usually with a family member as bishop, which Paris was keen to bring to an end. The elderly Anne d'Escars de Givry, bishop of Lisieux, was appointed as a placeholder bishop, and Henri was given an expectative appointment, in effect a reservation, plus a pension from the revenues, until he reached adult age. Pope Paul V agreed to appoint him in 1612, after the death of d'Escars, at the request of Louis XIII, despite Henri being only 11 and not ordained. He was never ordained and never resided at Metz, appointing deputies to run the diocesan affairs.

He resigned as bishop in favour of Cardinal Mazarin in 1652, a move Pope Innocent X did not recognize. He was declared dismissed by Pope Alexander VII in 1659. He was knighted on 31 December 1661 and created duke of Verneuil in 1663. In 1665 he became ambassador to England and in 1666 was made governor of Languedoc. He married Charlotte (1622-1704), daughter of the chancellor Pierre Séguier and widow of Maximilien François de Bethune, 2nd Duke of Sully (1614–1661), on 29 October 1668, when he was 67 and she 46. He died without issue on 28 May 1682 at Château de Verneuil.

== Ancestry ==
Ancestors of Henri, Duke of Verneuil

16. Francis, Count of Vendôme
8. Charles, Duke of Vendôme
17. Marie of Luxembourg
4. Antoine of Navarre
18. René, Duke of Alençon
9. Françoise of Alençon
19. Margaret of Lorraine
2. Henry IV of France
20. John III of Navarre
10. Henry II of Navarre
21. Catherine of Navarre
5. Jeanne III of Navarre
22. Charles, Count of Angoulême
11. Marguerite of Angoulême
23. Louise of Savoy
1. Henri, Duke of Verneuil
24. Pierre de Balzac, baron d'Entragues
12. Guillaume de Balzac, seigneur d'Entragues
25. Anne Malet de Graville, dame de Montagu et du Bois-Malesherbes
6. François de Balzac, seigneur d'Entragues
26. Jean II, seigneur d'Humières
13. Louise d'Humières
27. Françoise, dame de Contay
3. Catherine Henriette de Balzac d'Entragues
28. Pierre Touchet
14. Jean Touchet
29. Marie L'Age
7. Marie Touchet, dame de Belleville
30. Orable Mathy
15. Marie Mathy

== Sources ==
- Cook, Harold J. (2018). The Young Descartes: Nobility, Rumor, and War. University of Chicago Press.
