= Canton of Creil =

Canton of France

Coordinates: 49.26°N 2.48°E

- Canton
- Situation of the canton of Creil in the department of Oise
- Country: France
- Region: Hauts-de-France
- Department: Oise
- No. of communes: {{{nbcomm}}}
- Population (2023): 41,076
- INSEE code: 6008

The canton of Creil is an administrative division of the Oise department, northern France. It was created at the French canton reorganisation which came into effect in March 2015. Its seat is in Creil.

It consists of the following communes:

1. Creil
2. Verneuil-en-Halatte
