= Hôtel de Ville, Creil =

Town hall in Creil, France

Hôtel de Ville
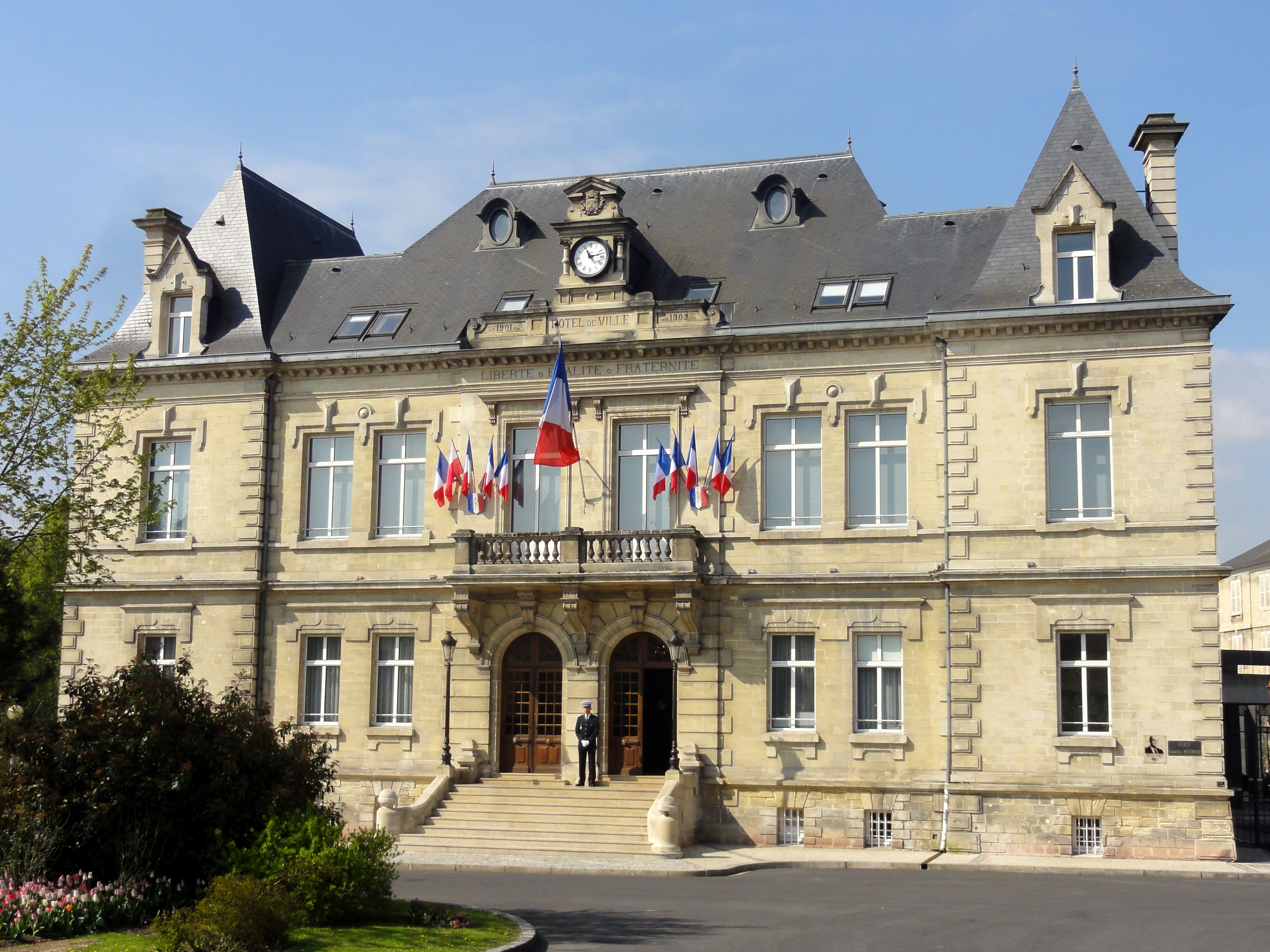
- The main frontage of the Hôtel de Ville in April 2013
- Interactive map of the Hôtel de Ville area

General information
- Type: City hall
- Architectural style: Gothic Revival style
- Location: Creil, France
- Coordinates: 49.2607°N 2.4728°E
- Completed: 1903

Design and construction
- Architect: Paul Heneux

The Hôtel de Ville (French pronunciation: [otɛl də vil], City Hall) is a municipal building in Creil, Oise, in northern France, standing on Place François Mitterrand.

== History ==
Following the French Revolution, the town council met in the Château de Creil. Although, after two centuries of neglect, the château was in a dilapidated state, the southeast part of the building was put to municipal use. The municipal buildings were built around the southeast tower, with the town hall to the west and the fire station to the east. The southeast tower itself contained a police station and two cells on the ground floor and a magistrate's office on the first floor.

This arrangement continued until the late 19th century, when the council considered proposals to refurbish the southeast tower, but, after some debate, they decided to demolish both the tower and the Collegiate Church of Saint-Évremont to make way for the new town hall. The church dated from the 12th century but, after it was placed under an interdict from the local bishop in the 18th century, it was no longer used. Construction work started with the demolition of the tower and the church in 1901. The new building was designed by Paul Heneux in the Gothic Revival style, built in ashlar stone and was officially opened by the mayor, Albert Dugué, on 7 June 1903.

The design involved a symmetrical main frontage of eight bays facing onto what is now Place François Mitterrand, with the end bays slightly projected forward. The central two bays, which were also slightly projected forward, featured a short flight of steps leading up to a pair of round headed doorways with voussoirs and keystones on the ground floor, and two French doors with a balustraded balcony and a cornice on the first floor. The other bays were fenestrated by casement windows with cornices on the ground floor and by casement windows with hood moulds on the first floor. At roof level, there was an entablature, a modillioned cornice and a clock flanked by columns supporting a triangular pediment. Behind the clock, there was originally a square lantern, but this was later removed. Internally, the principal room was the Salle du Conseil (council chamber).

During the Second World War, a shorthand typist at the town hall, Hélène Vilatte, worked with the mayor, Jean Biondi, to produce false identity cards for the French Resistance. Biondi was later arrested and sent to Mauthausen concentration camp. The building was modernised and enlarged, with a large glass-clad extension at the rear, in 1962.
