= Bernard de Nogaret de La Valette d'Épernon =

17th-century French nobleman

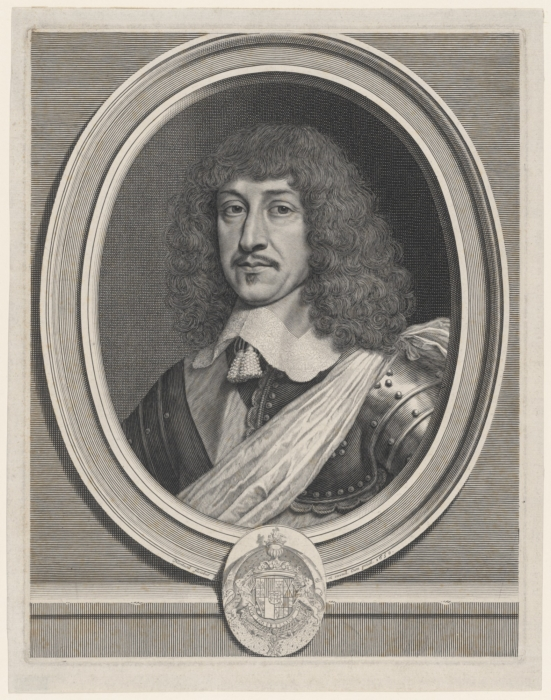
Engraved portrait of Bernard de Nogaret de La Valette, 1650, by Robert Nanteuil, Yale University Art Gallery

Bernard de Nogaret de La Valette (1592 – 25 July 1661) was Duke of Épernon and a French general, the son of Jean Louis de Nogaret de La Valette and Marguerite de Foix-Candale, granddaughter of the constable of Montmorency. Through his mother's line, Bernard could also claim the English title of Earl of Kendal, originally granted to his ancestor John de Foix in 1446.

== Life ==
Bernard was born in 1592 in Angoulême. In 1622, he married Gabrielle-Angélique de Verneuil, legitimised daughter of Henri IV and the Marquise de Verneuil, with whom he had a son, Louis-Charles-Gaston de Candale, and a daughter, Anne-Louise-Christine de Foix de La Valette d'Épernon. Gabrielle-Angélique died in 1627 (some say Bernard poisoned her) and in 1634 he married Marie Ducambaut, a niece of Cardinal Richelieu. It was not a happy marriage, as Bernard later conceived a lifelong passion for a middle-class woman named Ninon de Lartigue, who exerted absolute power over him and to whom he gave enormous sums of money.

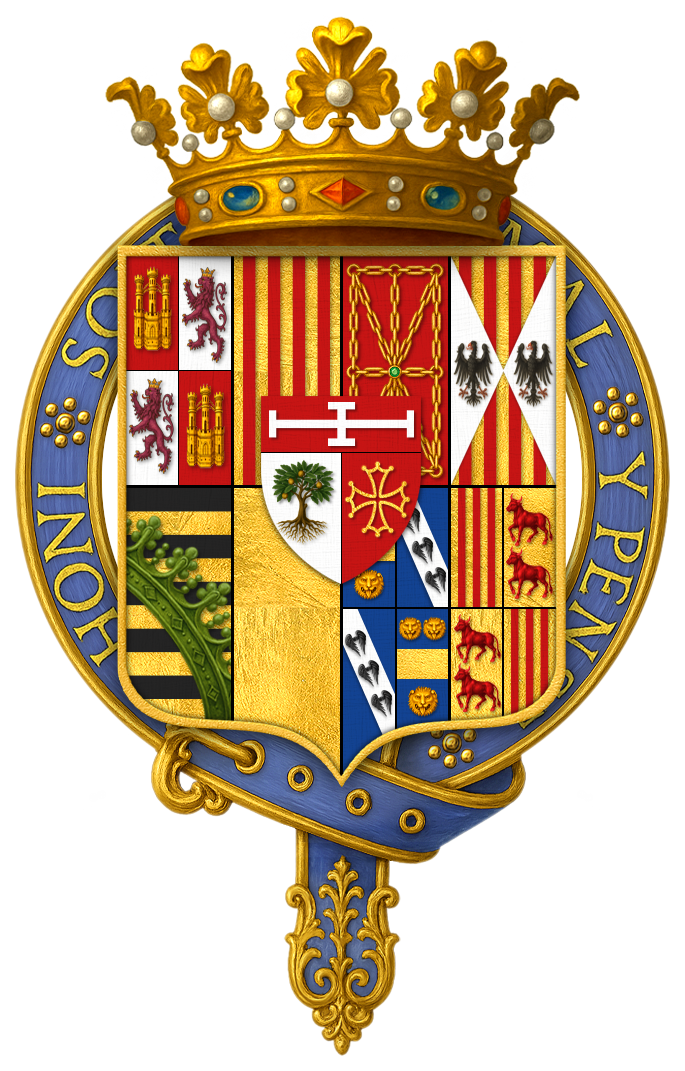
Gartered arms of Bernard de Nogaret de Foix, Duc d'Épernon, KG

Like his father, Bernard made a career of the military. He was named colonel-general of infantry and fought at the sieges of Saint-Jean-d'Angély (1621) and Royan (1622) and at the attack of the pas de Suse (1629). On 15 May 1633, Bernard became a Chevalier du Saint-Esprit and in 1635 he was charged by Louis XIII with restoring the order which had been disturbed by the lifting of taxes and religious passions. He fought in Picardy (1636), in Guyenne, and finally against the Spanish, and repressed a peasants' revolt, the Révolte des Croquants, in 1637.

Charged by the Prince de Condé in 1638 with leading the assault at the Siege of Fuenterrabía (Hondarribia), he refused, believing that the breach was not broad enough. He yielded his post to Vice-Admiral de Sourdis, who launched an ill-fated attack which resulted in heavy losses. The disaster was nonetheless attributed to the Duke of Valette, who had nothing to do with it and in fact had rejoined the remains of the army and led it to Bayonne. Richelieu, who hated de La Valette, had him tried in front of an extraordinary court chaired by the king himself (1639). The court returned a sentence of death but de La Valette, who knew Richelieu well, had prudently departed for England where he received the Order of the Garter. The penalty was carried out in effigy.

In 1642 Bernard's father died, raising him to the title of Duke of Épernon. After the death of Louis XIII, Bernard returned to France where the Parlement of Paris cancelled the judgement against him (1643). In 1648 he became governor of Guyenne. That same year, he was responsible for transporting artillery of the Château du Hâ to arm the Château-Trompette to put down unrest resulting from the Parliament of Bordeaux's refusal to allow the departure of a shipment of corn, for fear of famine. Bernard also served as governor of Burgundy (1654–1660) and was a guard of the theatre company of Charles Dufresne (whose most famous member was Molière).

He died in Paris in 1661.

== Family ==
Bernard's children included:

- Anne-Louise-Christine de Foix de La Valette, Mlle. d’Épernon. Became a Carmelite nun.
- Louis-Charles-Gaston de Candale

== See also ==
- Guillaume de Nogaret
- Jean Parisot de la Valette
- Jean Louis de Nogaret de La Valette
