= Marie Touchet =

Mistress to Charles IX of France

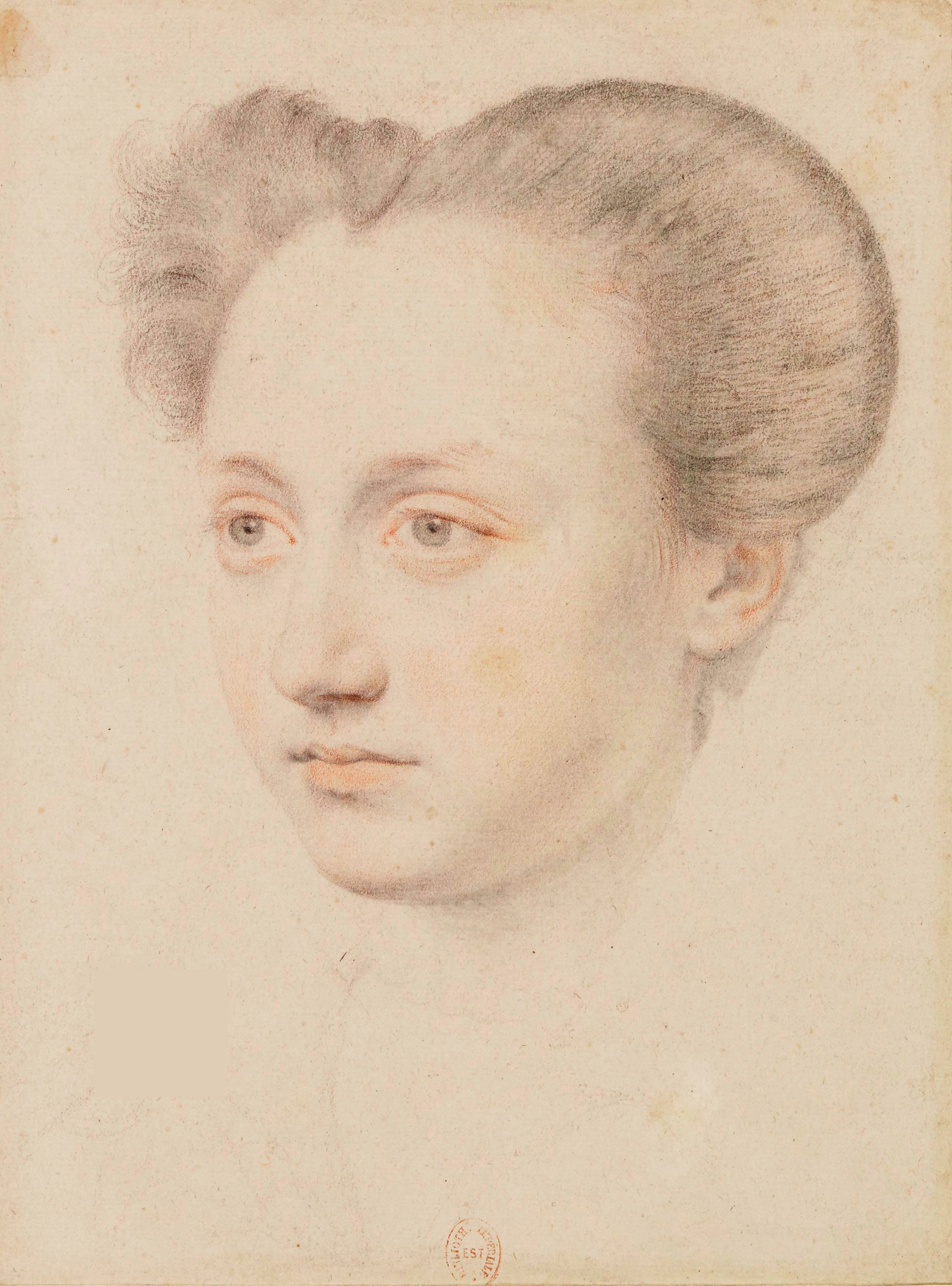
- Marie Touchet, mistress of Charles IX of France, etching by François Quesnel
- Born: 1549; Orléans, France
- Died: 28 March 1638 (aged 88 or 89); Paris, France
- Spouse: Charles Balzac d'Entragues
- Children: Charles de Valois; Catherine Henriette de Balzac d'Entragues; Marie-Charlotte de Balzac d'Entragues
- Parent(s): Jean Touchet; Marie Mathy

Marie Touchet (French pronunciation: [maʁi tuʃɛ]; 1549 – 28 March 1638), Dame de Belleville, was the only mistress of Charles IX of France.

== Life ==
Although born to a bourgeois family at Orléans, the daughter of Marie Mathy and a Huguenot lieutenant Jean Touchet, she "held her row at court as well as any of the first class ladies" (Le Laboureur, historian). Her anagrammed name was even Je Charme Tout meaning "I charm all." Henry III, King of Navarre was responsible for this clever wordplay.

By her late teens, she was mistress to Charles IX. In 1573 she bore the king a son, Charles de Valois. It would be his only son, for just one year later the king died, at which time his and Marie's son was entrusted to the care of his younger brother and successor, Henry III of France. The new king was faithful to his dead brother's wishes and raised little Charles dutifully. Marie Touchet received a pension for her services to Charles IX, and continued as a part of the royal circle.

Marie went on to marry the marquis d'Entragues, Charles Balzac d'Entragues, and had two daughters, Catherine Henriette de Balzac d'Entragues and Marie-Charlotte de Balzac d'Entragues. Both daughters would follow in their mother's footsteps, later becoming the mistresses of Henry IV of France. Marie died in Paris.

== Children ==
With Charles IX, King of France, she had:

- Charles de Valois

With her husband Charles Balzac d'Entragues, she had:

- Catherine Henriette de Balzac d'Entragues
- Marie-Charlotte de Balzac d'Entragues

== Sources ==
- Adams, Tracy; Adams, Christine, eds. (2020). "Gabrielle d'Estrees: Never the Twain Shall Meet". The Creation of the French Royal Mistress: From Agnès Sorel to Madame Du Barry. Penn State University Press. pp. 85–109. ISBN 9780271086446.
- Boucher, Jacqueline (2007). Société et mentalités autour de Henri III (in French). Champion. ISBN 9782745314406.
- Tapié, Victor L. (1988). France in the Age of Louis XIII and Richelieu. Cambridge University Press. ISBN 978-0275525309.
- Vincent, Marylène (2015). Henri IV et les femmes. De l'amour à la mort (in French). MGMD. ISBN 9791092463156.
