= Catherine Henriette de Balzac d'Entragues =

Mistress of Henry IV

Henriette d'Entragues Marquise de Verneuil
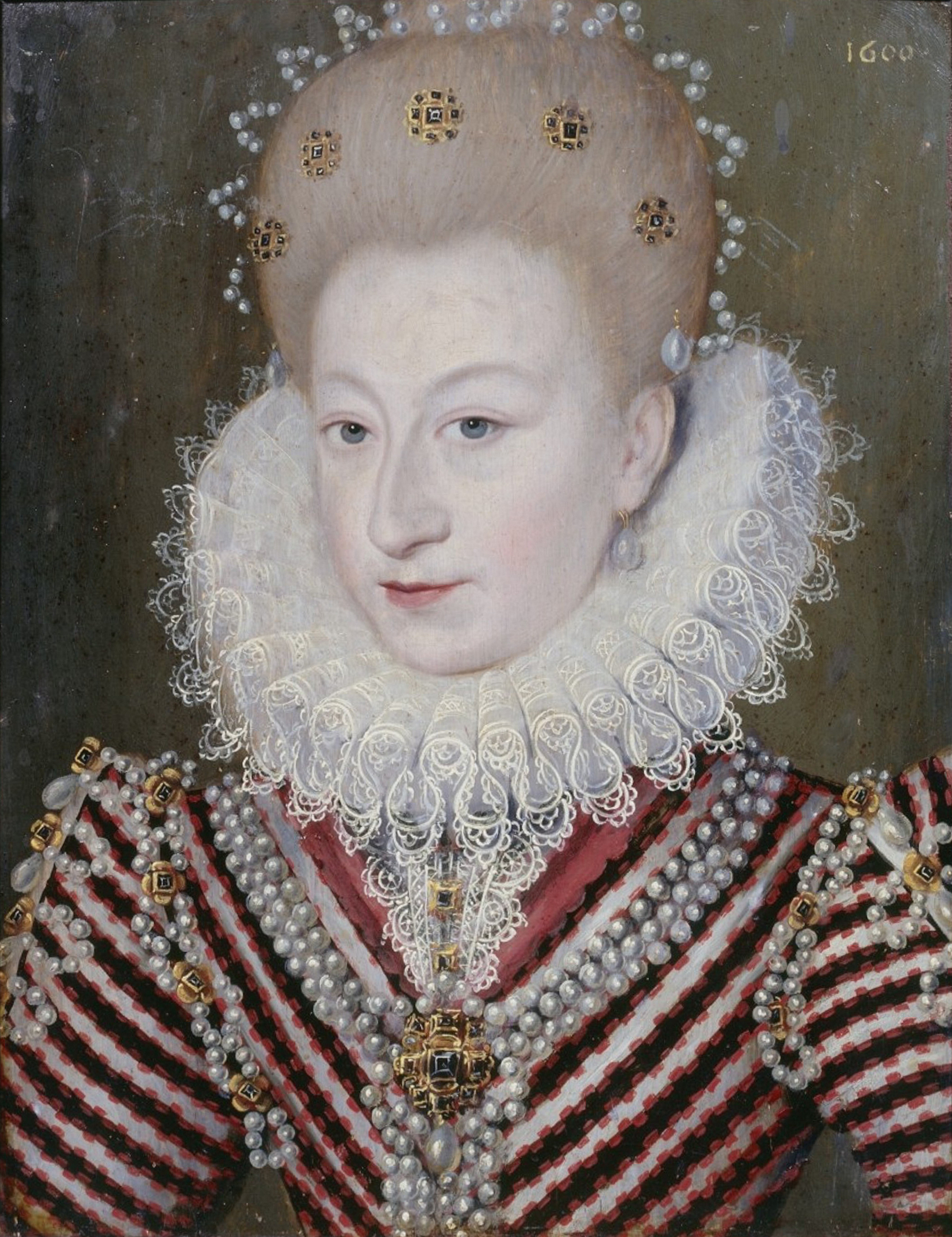
- Portrait of Catherine Henriette de Balzac d'Entragues
- Born: 1579
- Died: 1633 (aged 53–54)
- Children: Gaston Henri, Duc de Verneuil; Gabrielle Angélique de Bourbon, Mademoiselle de Verneuil
- Parent(s): Charles Balzac d'Entragues; Marie Touchet

Catherine Henriette de Balzac d'Entragues, Marquise de Verneuil [katʁin ɑ̃ʁjɛt də balzak dɑ̃tʁaɡ maʁkiz də vɛʁnœj] (1579–1633) was the favourite mistress of Henry IV of France after Gabrielle d'Estrées died: her sister Marie-Charlotte de Balzac d’Entragues was also a mistress of the king. She was the daughter of Charles Balzac d'Entragues and his wife Marie Touchet, who was formerly the sole mistress of Charles IX of France.

== Royal mistress ==
Catherine Henriette de Balzac was raised at a time when women often sought to become a royal mistress to royalty, and her mother Marie had previously been a mistress to Charles IX before her birth.

Ambitious, pretty and intriguing, by her late teens she had succeeded in becoming a mistress to Henry IV. While Henry was still deeply grieving over the death of Gabrielle d'Estrées, she induced him into a written promise to marry her. This led to bitter scenes of jealousy and arguing at the court when shortly afterwards Henry married Marie de' Medici instead.

Terribly infuriated and feeling betrayed, she carried her spite so far as to be deeply compromised in a conspiracy against the king in 1608, but escaped with only a slight punishment after the plot was foiled, and in 1608 Henry took her back into favour again as one of his mistresses.

She was later involved in the Spanish intrigues which preceded the death of the King in 1610. Upon the King's death, his wife, Marie de' Medici, was named Regent by Parliament, and immediately exiled Catherine from the royal court. She lived 23 years after Henri's death, dying in 1633 at the age of 54.

== Children ==
She had two children with the king:

Name	Birth	Legitimized	Death	Notes
Gaston Henri, Duc de Verneuil	1601	1603	1682	Married Charlotte Seguier, daughter of Pierre Séguier, Duc de Villemor.
Gabrielle Angelique, called Mademoiselle de Verneuil	1603		1627	Married Bernard de Nogaret de Foix, Duc de La Valette et d'Épernon.

== See also ==
- Henry IV of France's wives and mistresses
- List of French royal mistresses
