= Charles de Valois, Duke of Angoulême =

Charles de Valois
- Duke of Angoulême
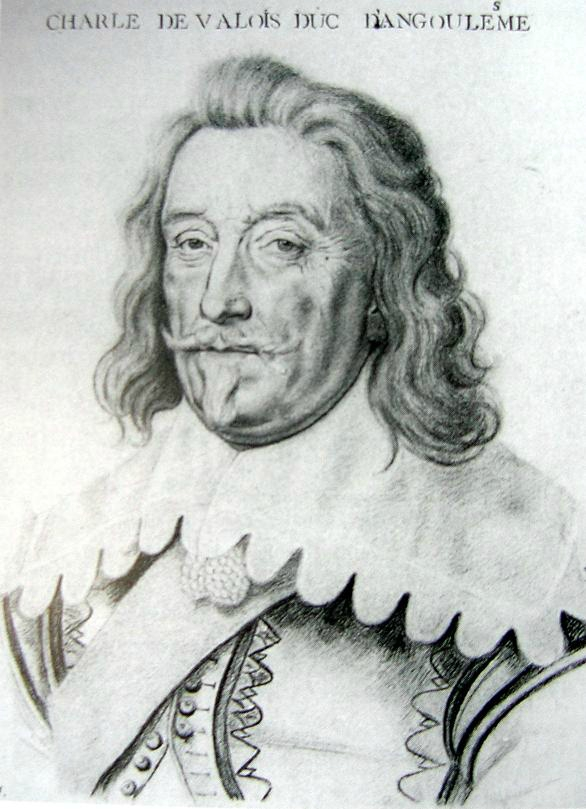
- Charles de Valois, drawing by Daniel Dumonstier.
- Born: 28 April 1573; Château de Fayet, Dauphiné, France
- Died: 24 September 1650 (aged 77)
- Spouse: Charlotte de Montmorency (m. 1591–1636) Françoise de Narbonne (m. 1644–1650)
- Issue: Henri de Valois; Louis-Emmanuel d'Angoulême; François de Valois
- House: Valois-Angoulême
- Father: Charles IX of France
- Mother: Marie Touchet

Charles de Valois (28 April 1573 – 24 September 1650) was an illegitimate son of Charles IX of France and Marie Touchet. He was count of Auvergne, duke of Angoulême, and a memoirist.

== Biography ==
Charles de Valois was born at the Château de Fayet in Dauphiné in 1573, the illegitimate son of Charles IX and Marie Touchet. His father, died the following year, commended him to the care and favour of Henry III, who faithfully fulfilled the charge. His mother then married François de Balzac, marquis d'Entragues.

Charles de Valois was carefully educated and was inducted into the Knights of Malta. In 1588, he attained one of the highest dignities of the order, being made Grand Prior of France. Shortly after he came into possession of large estates left by his paternal grandmother Catherine de' Medici, from one of which he took his title of count of Auvergne.

Following Henry III's assassination, Charles was commended to the good-will of his successor Henry IV. Under Henry IV he was made colonel of horse, and in that capacity commanded a squadron at the Battle of Ivry.

In 1601, Charles engaged in the conspiracy formed by the Dukes of Savoy, Biron and Monsieur de Turenne. The conspiracy was discovered; Biron and Bouillon were arrested and Biron was executed. Charles was released after a few months' imprisonment, chiefly through the influence of his half-sister, his aunt, the duchess of Angoulême and his father-in-law.

Charles then entered into fresh intrigues with the court of Philip III of Spain, acting in concert with Henriette de Balzac d'Entragues, his half-sister, and her father d'Entragues. In 1604 he and d'Entragues were arrested and condemned to death; at the same time Henriette was condemned to perpetual imprisonment in a convent. She easily obtained pardon, and the sentence of death against the other two was commuted into perpetual imprisonment. Charles remained in the Bastille for eleven years, from 1605 to 1616. A decree of the parlement (1606), obtained by Marguerite de Valois, deprived him of nearly all his possessions, including Auvergne, though he still retained the title. In 1616 he was released, was restored to his rank of colonel-general of horse, and dispatched against one of the disaffected nobles, the duke of Longueville, who had taken Péronne. Next year he commanded the forces collected in the Île-de-France, and obtained some successes.

In 1619 he received by bequest, ratified in 1620 by royal grant, the duchy of Angoulême. Soon after he was engaged on an important embassy to the Holy Roman Empire, the result of which was the treaty of Ulm, signed July 1620. In 1627 he commanded the large forces assembled at the siege of La Rochelle; and some years after in 1635, during the Thirty Years' War, he was general of the French army in Lorraine. In 1636 he was made lieutenant-general of the army. He appears to have retired from public life shortly after the death of Richelieu in 1643.

The duke was the author of the following works:

- Mémoires, from the assassination of Henri III. to the battle of Arques (1589–1593) published at Paris by Boneau, and reprinted by Buchon in his Choix de chroniques (1836) and by Petitot in his Mémoires (1st series, vol. xliv.)
- Les Harangues, prononcées en assemblée de MM. les princes protestants d'Allemagne, par Monseigneur le duc d' Angoulême (1620)
- a translation of a Spanish work by Diego de Torres.
- La générale et fidèle Relation de tout ce qui s'est passé en l'Isle de Ré, envoyée par le Roy à la Royne sa mère (Paris, 1624).

Angoulême died on 24 September 1650.

== Personal life ==
In 1591 he obtained a dispensation from the vows of the Order of Malta, and married Charlotte, daughter of Henry, maréchal d'Amville, afterwards Duke of Montmorency and his first wife. They had had three children:

- Henri
- Louis-Emmanuel de Valois, Count d'Alais, who succeeded his father as duke of Angoulême and was colonel-general of light cavalry and governor of Provence; his daughter Marie Françoise de Valois married Louis, Duke of Joyeuse;
- François, who died in 1622.

Charles' first wife died in 1636, and in 1644 he married Françoise de Narbonne, daughter of Charles, baron of Mareuil. They had no children and survived her husband until 1713.

== Sources ==
- Baynes, T. S., ed. (1878), "Charles de Valois, Duke of Angouleme" , Encyclopædia Britannica, vol. 2 (9th ed.), New York: Charles Scribner's Sons, p. 46
- Bergin, Joseph (1996), The Making of the French Episcopate, 1589–1661, Yale University Press
- Davenport, Richard Alfred, The History of the Bastile and of its Principal Captives, Kessinger Publishing
- James, Alan (2004). The Navy and Government in Early Modern France, 1572-1661. Boydell & Brewer.
- Kettering, Sharon (2008). Power and reputation at the court of Louis XIII: The career of Charles d'Albert, duc de Luynes (1578-1621). Manchester University Press.
- Knecht, Robert J. (2016). Hero or Tyrant? Henry III, King of France, 1574-89. Routledge.
- McIlvenna, Una (2016). Scandal and Reputation at the Court of Catherine de Medici. Routledge.
- Taylor, William Cooke (1842), Romantic Biography of the Age of Elizabeth: Calvin and the Church of Geneva, London: Richard Bentley
- Pitts, Vincent J. (2009). Henri IV of France: His Reign and Age. Johns Hopkins University Press.
- Tucker, Spencer, ed. (2010). "Siege of La Rochelle". Battles that Changed History: An Encyclopedia of World Conflict. ABC-CLIO.189

Attribution
