= Palazzo Sozzifanti =

Palace in Tuscany, Italy

Coordinates: 43.935151°N 10.915334°E

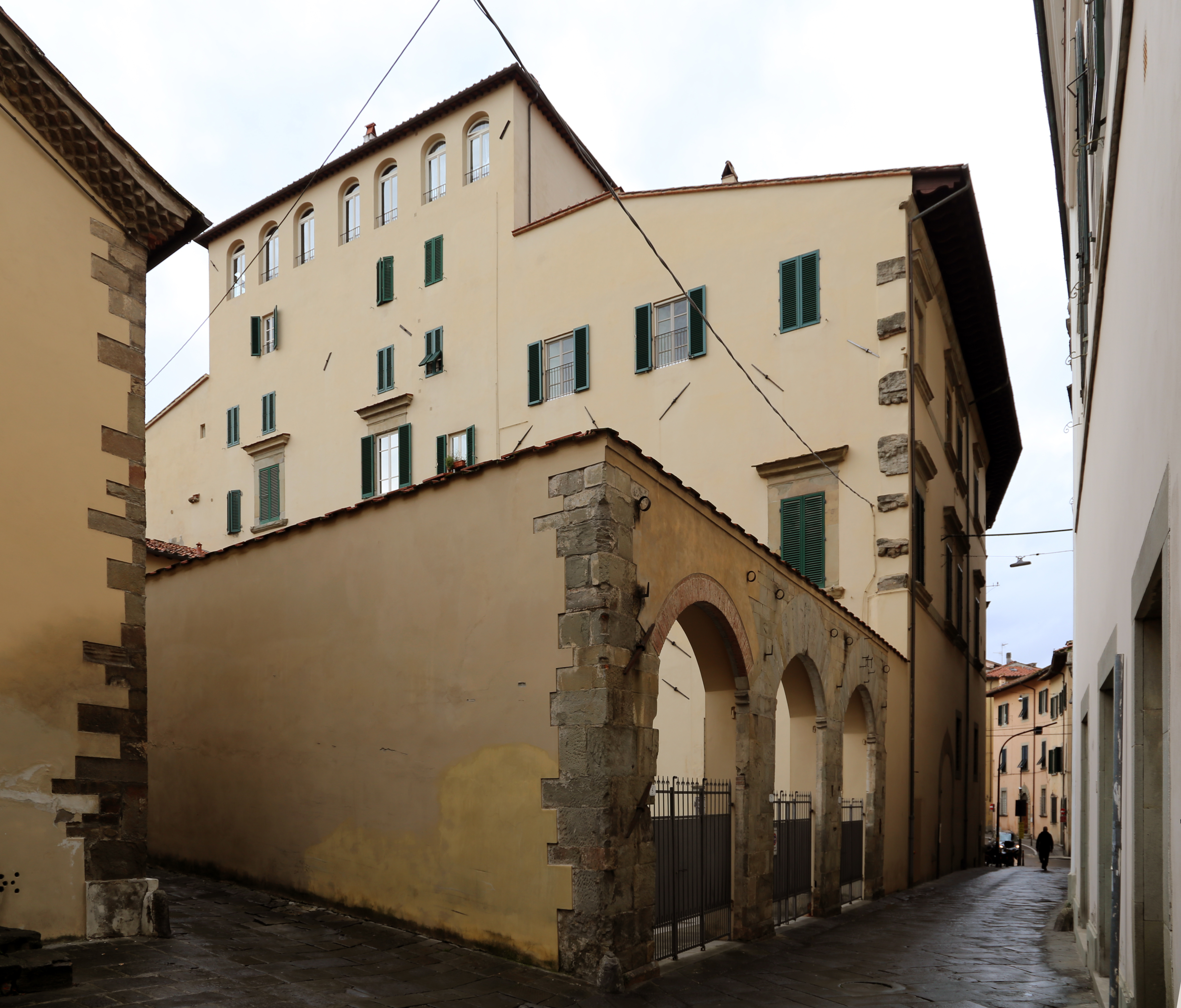
View of rear of palace from Via Abbi Pazienza

The Palazzo Sozzifanti also known as the Palazzo Buontalenti is a Renaissance-style palace located at the intersection of Via del Carmine, Via de' Rossi, Via Abbi Pazienza and Via Sant'Andrea in central Pistoia, Tuscany, Italy. The palace is used in 2019 as a temporary exhibition site by the Cassa di Risparmio di Pistoia and Pescia Foundation.

== Description ==
The design of the palace is attributed to Bernardo Buontalenti, and the building was initially intended for either the Grand Duke of Tuscany or one of his magistrates. Construction took place from 1527 to 1590, and a few years later the palace was sold to the wealthy noblemen, Ottavio and Giulio di Bartolomeo Sozzifanti. The palace once had an elevated walkway linking to the church of San Biagio, allowing the members to attend mass without entering the street. The palace has undergone a number of reconstructions, but retains its internal courtyard with a double-column loggia and portico.
