= San Giacomo Scossacavalli =

Church in Rome, destroyed in 1937

Church of San Giacomo Scossacavalli
- Chiesa di San Giacomo Scossacavalli (in Italian)
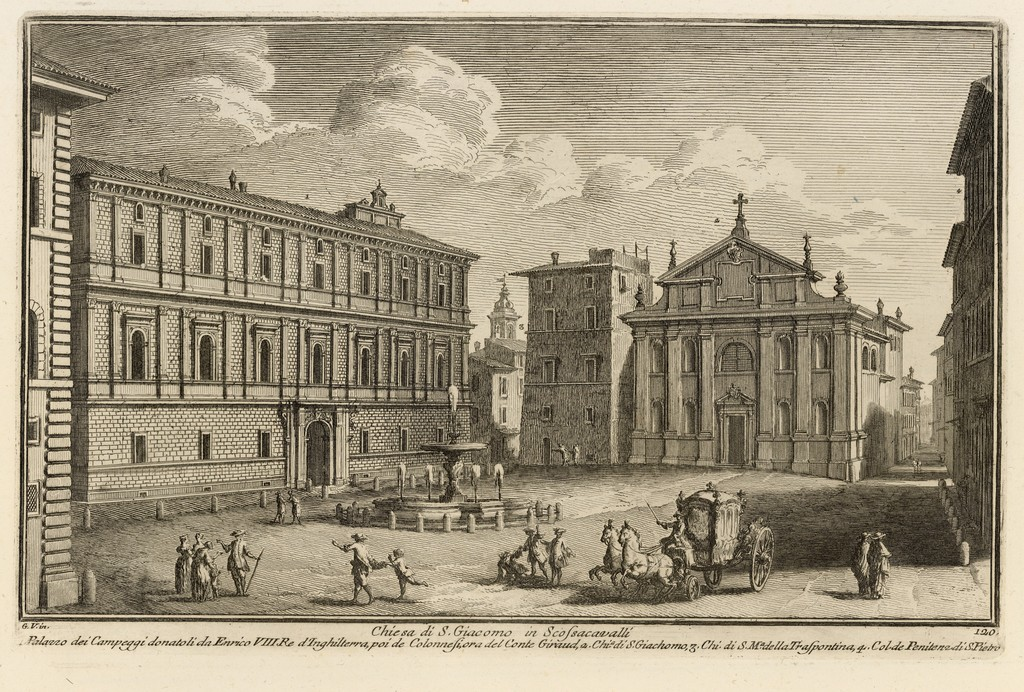
- Piazza Scossacavalli with Palazzo Torlonia and San Giacomo in an 18th-century etching by Giuseppe Vasi
- Click on the map for a fullscreen view
- 41°54′8.5″N 12°27′41.5″E
- Location: Rome
- Country: Italy
- Denomination: Roman Catholic

History
- Status: Parish (1275–1825)
- Dedication: St. James
- Consecrated: Before 8th century; 23 November 1777

Architecture
- Functional status: Destroyed in 1937
- Architect: Antonio da Sangallo the Younger
- Style: Renaissance, Mannerist
- Groundbreaking: About 1520
- Completed: 1592

Specifications
- Materials: Stone, Brickwork

San Giacomo Scossacavalli (San Giacomo a Scossacavalli) was a church in Rome important for historical and artistic reasons. The church, facing the Piazza Scossacavalli, was built during the early Middle Ages and since the early 16th century hosted a confraternity which commissioned Renaissance architect Antonio da Sangallo the Younger to build a new shrine. This was richly decorated with frescoes, painted (among others) by mannerist artist Giovanni Battista Ricci and his students. The church was demolished in 1937, when Via della Conciliazione (the avenue leading to St. Peter's Basilica) was built and the piazza and central part of the Borgo rione were demolished. Many decorative elements still exist, since they were preserved from demolition.

== Location ==
The church was located in Rome's Borgo rione, on the east side of Piazza Scossacavalli, its facade facing west and opposite the Palazzo dei Convertendi. Its south side paralleled the Borgo Vecchio.

== History ==
=== Middle Ages ===
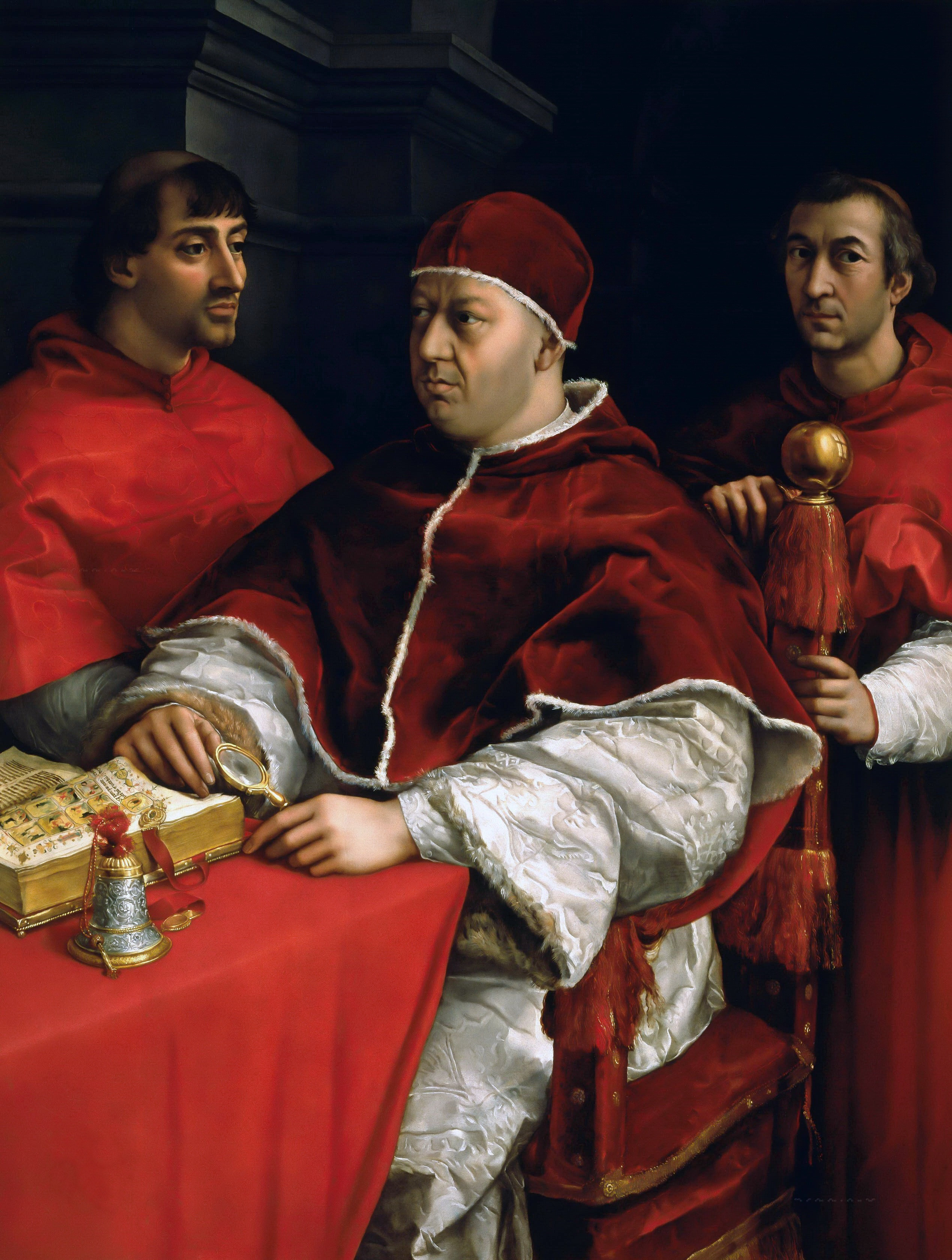
In 1513 Pope Leo X acknowledged the Confraternity of the Blessed Sacrament, which was entrusted with the care of San Giacomo in 1520.

The church's name gave birth to a legend. When Helena (mother of Constantine the Great) returned from her trip to the Holy Land, she brought back two stone relics: one from the presentation of Jesus at the Temple and one on which Abraham bound Isaac. The empress wanted to donate the stones to Saint Peter's Basilica, but when the convoy arrived at the site of the future church the horses (Italian: cavalli) refused to move further despite urging (Italian: scossi). A chapel hosting the stones was built, the origin of the church. The most probable reason for the name was the discovery, near the square, of a thigh from a Roman equestrian statue (coxa caballi in Vulgar Latin).

The church had an ancient origin: during the Middle Ages it was dedicated to the Redeemer (Italian: Salvatore), and was called San Salvatoris de Coxa Caballi in the papal bulls of Sergius I (r. 687–701) and Leo IV (r. 847-55). It is also mentioned in the main medieval catalogues of Roman churches, like that of Cencio Camerarius and of Paris.

According to some sources, the church could be identified with San Salvatore de Bordonia; a bordone was the staff borne by pilgrims coming to St. Peter's. These would have left their staffs in San Giacomo before entering Saint Peter, exactly as they did after completing the Way of St. James, and this fact would explain also the late dedication to Saint James.

In 1250, relics of St. James were brought to the church and its dedication was changed. It was usually known in contemporary documents as S. Jacobus de Portico, where the Porticus in medieval Rome was the covered passage linking Saint Peter's with the Tiber (Porticus Sancti Petri). In 1198 Pope Innocent III (r. 1198–1216) entrusted the Chapter of Saint Peter (Italian: Capitolo di San Pietro) with the church's care, and in 1275 the church became a parish.

=== Renaissance ===
Piazza Scossacavalli with San Giacomo and the fountain of Carlo Maderno in a 17th-century etching by Giovanni Battista Falda

In 1520 the confraternity of the Blessed Sacrament (Italian: Confraternita del Santissimo Sacramento) was entrusted with the church's care. The confraternity originated in Borgo in 1509. On a windy evening of 1506, a Carmelite coming from the old Santa Maria in Traspontina church (lying near Castel Sant'Angelo), followed by a lay brother bearing a candle, was bringing the sacramental bread to a sick person. Since the wind had extinguished the candle, the layman went into a nearby shop asking for fire, so that the priest was left alone. At the sight of the lone priest bearing the blessed Sacrament, several passers-by were moved, gathered around him and accompanied him, bearing a baldachin and torches. The group grew, and on 3 September 1509 its members formed a compagnia. The Carmelites assigned it to a chapel in Santa Maria in Traspontina, and in 1513 Pope Leo X (r. 1513–21) acknowledged the association, which in 1520 moved to San Giacomo.

The members wore clothing made from white hessian fabric (Italian: sacchi). It had a small figure on the left shoulder: a vermilion chalice and an image of Christ with open arms. The confraternity was committed to provide a doctor and barber to the poor of the parish, and each Holy Thursday in the church it exhibited a wax sculpture of the crucified Christ. An annual procession went to Santa Maria Sopra Minerva in Pigna, the Pauline Chapel in the Apostolic Palace and finally to St. Peter's. In 1578 Pope Gregory XIII (r. 1572–85) made the association an archconfraternity. The association's duties and privileges increased; each year beginning in 1580, the brothers gave four poor parish girls a white dress and twenty-five scudi as a dowry. In 1590, Pope Sixtus V (r.1585–90) gave the archconfraternity the privilege of setting free each year a person condemned to death..

Shortly after their assignment to San Giacomo, the brethren started to reconstruct it, choosing as architect Antonio da Sangallo the Younger, but due to lack of funds its facade was still unfinished in 1590. That year Ludovico Fulgineo, ecclesiastical referendary and governor of the archconfraternity, died, leaving his inheritance to the association. Thanks to his legacy, two years later, the construction was finished. In 1601, an oratory dedicated to Saint Sebastian was built behind the church.

=== Baroque and Modern Ages ===
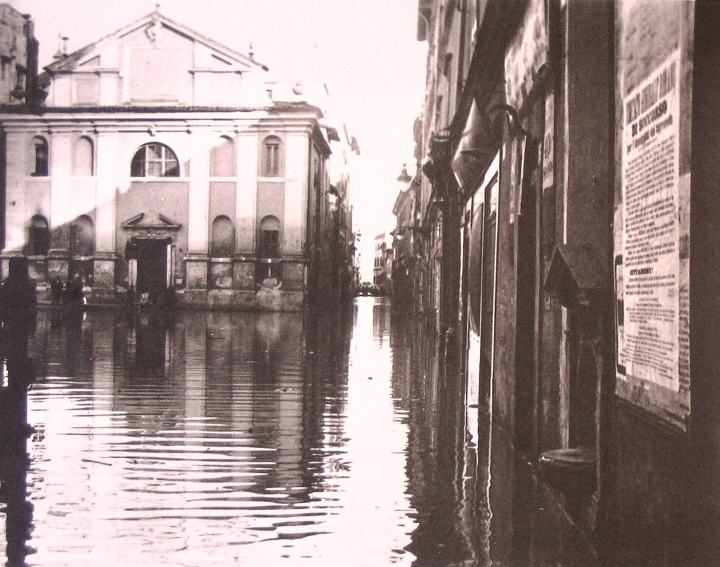
The church in Piazza Scossacavalli and the Borgo Vecchio during the Tiber flood of 15 February 1915

San Giacomo underwent thorough restorations in the first half of the 17th century and the second half of the 18th. On 23 November 1777, the church was reconsecrated by Cardinal Henry Benedict Stuart.

It was damaged during the French occupation of Rome under Napoleon and restored in 1810 and 1880, when the stone socles were removed. In 1825 San Giacomo lost its status as a parish. In 1927 a fire damaged several works of art, and in 1929 it was assigned to the Sons of Divine Providence.

The church was demolished by 30 September 1937 for the construction of Via della Conciliazione. Its art was given to the Capitolo di San Pietro and then to the Museo Petriano; some chapel frescoes are on display at the Museo di Roma. Elements of the facade, including the 17th-century travertino portal decorated with cherubs, are in the comune storehouse at the Bastione Ardeatino. The two relics (of Isaac's sacrifice and the presentation of Jesus in the temple) were placed in the church of the Santi Michele e Magno, the national church of the Dutch in Borgo, during the early 1990s; the latter is now the church's main altar.

== Description ==
The church's artistic importance is primarily due to its design by Antonio da Sangallo the Younger and its frescoes and paintings, particularly those by the Piemontese mannerist painter Giovanni Battista Ricci and his students.

=== Architecture ===
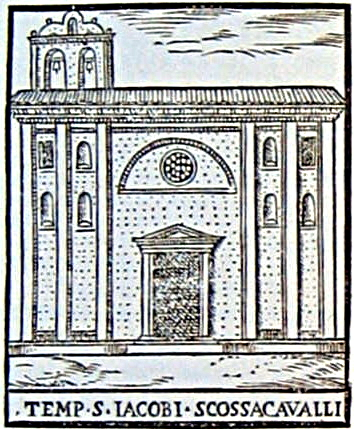
The church in a woodcut by Girolamo Franzini from Cose maravigliose dell'alma città di Roma, published in 1588

When Antonio da Sangallo was commissioned to rebuild the church, his main problem was its shape; its width, facing Piazza Scossacavalli, was longer than its depth (along Borgo Vecchio). Drawings in the Uffizi indicate several solutions: a single-nave plan, oriented along its long side with a side entrance, and octagonal and oval plans. The latter was adopted by Giacomo Barozzi da Vignola for the church of Sant'Anna dei Palafrenieri, and became popular during the 17th century. Sangallo did not adopt any of these plans, instead deciding to reduce the area of the church, whose plan became a rectangle with its long side normal to Piazza Scossacavalli. Its nave was flanked by four large niches, and Sangallo designed four rooms (two on each side) as sacristies.

The church's appearance in the mid-16th century, shortly before its completion, is known from a woodcut by Girolamo Franzini. Its facade appears almost square; at its center there was a portal with a tympanum, surmounted by a large fanlight opened by a round window. On its side were three rows of pilasters with two pairs of niches, one over the other. A bell-gable was on one side of the roof.

When the facade was completed high plinths, consisting of a tympanum with a large panel adorned with frescoes and outlined by a mixtilinear frame, were added at the base of the pilasters. At the slopes' edges were two candelabra, and two oriflammes were at the base of the second order. These elements gave the facade (which, since 1592, also bore the coats of arms of Pope Clement VIII (r. 1592–1605) and the confraternity) an upward swing. The facade was adorned with frescoes of sacred subjects, including "faked figures of yellow Saints made of golden metal" attributed to Giovanni Guerra or Cristoforo Ambrogini.

The church, without an apse and a transept, maintained its original single-nave plan until at least 1627. In 1662 the naves had become three, separated by two rows of square brick pillars and surmounted by vaults. The church had five altars in 1627, increasing to six in 1649. In 1726 the closing of its side gate along the Borgo Vecchio made room for another altar.

=== Interior ===
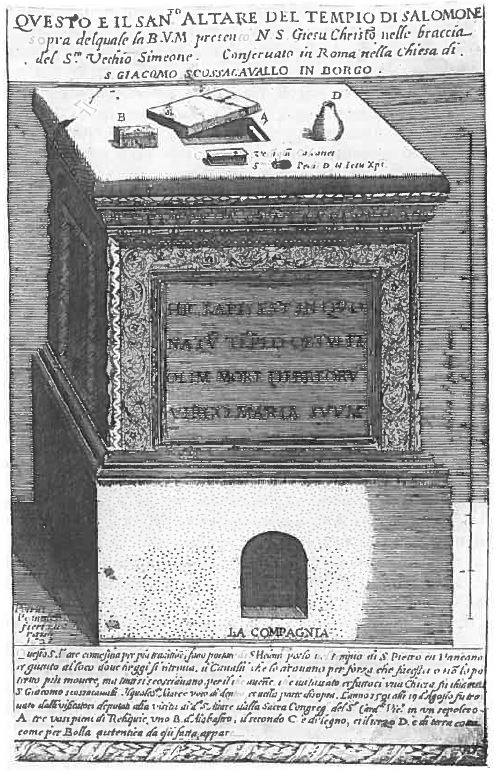
1623 engraving of the reported altar from Solomon's Temple in a chapel of the church

On the right side, the first chapel was dedicated to the Virgin Mary. On its vault were paintings of four Doctors of the Church (Ambrose, Jerome, Augustine and Gregory the Great), and its walls were adorned with frescoes by Cristoforo Ambrogini (or Ambrogi). Several frescoes, depicting events in the Life of the Virgin attributed to a late-mannerist Emilian artist, are on display at the Museo di Roma. The second chapel was dedicated to San Biagio, and housed a panel painting of the saint. This, the last chapel added to the church, was the original side door on the Borgo Vecchio. The third chapel was dedicated to the Nativity of Jesus. It was called "of the circumcision" because of a painting by Giovanni Battista Ricci (nicknamed "il Novara" after his birthplace) of the Circumcision of Jesus. It was also known as the "chapel of the stone", since the stone over which Jesus had reportedly been presented at the temple in Jerusalem was kept here; after the church's demolition, the stone and that of the sacrifice of Isaac were moved to the nearby church of Santi Michele e Magno. Above its altar was an oil painting by a student of Ricci of the presentation of Jesus. A 16th-century fresco depicting the Pietà as part of a choir of angels was on a bottom wall of the nave.

On the left side, the first chapel was dedicated to the Nativity of Mary. Since 1573 this chapel, the giuspatronato of the Milanese Carcano family, contained the stone reportedly used for Isaac's sacrifice. A Ricci painting of the birth of Mary was on its altar; on its vault were the Four Evangelists, and its walls were decorated with frescoes. The second chapel, dedicated to San Giacomo, had a statue (later replaced by a painting) of the saint above the altar and was the burial place for members of the Confraternity of the Blessed Sacrament. The third chapel, dedicated to the Crucifixion, contained a large sculpture of Christ on the cross.

A Ricci painting of the Last Supper was above the main altar, which was dedicated to Jesus the Redeemer; in 1662, a fresco of the Madonna was moved there. The Ardicini cardinals had the image painted on the facade of their palace in Borgo Sant'Angelo, and it was venerated by the local people because of a number of miracles attributed to her intercession. On the altar was an African-marble tabernacle by Giovanni Battista Ciolli, and to the right of the entrance was a holy water font presented to the church in 1589 by Francesco Del Sodo (a member of the archconfraternity). The church was the burial place of several people, whose tombstones adorned the floor; among them were the son and mother-in-law of Pirro Ligorio and Battista Gerosa, son of the Oratory of San Sebastiano architect Antonio Gerosa.

== Sources ==
- Baronio, Cesare (1697). Descrizione di Roma moderna (in Italian). M.A. and P.A. De Rossi, Roma.
- Borgatti, Mariano (1926). Borgo e S. Pietro nel 1300 –1600 –1925 (in Italian). Roma: Federico Pustet.
- Ceccarelli, Giuseppe (Ceccarius) (1938). La "Spina" dei Borghi (in Italian). Roma: Danesi.
- Castagnoli, Ferdinando; Cecchelli, Carlo; Giovannoni, Gustavo; Zocca, Mario (1958). Topografia e urbanistica di Roma (in Italian). Bologna: Cappelli.
- Delli, Sergio (1988) [1975]. Le strade di Roma (in Italian) (3 ed.). Roma: Newton Compton.
- Cambedda, Anna (1990). "La demolizione della Spina dei Borghi". Itinerari Didattici d'Arte e di Cultura (in Italian). Roma: Fratelli Palombi Editori. ISSN 0394-9753.
- Gigli, Laura (1992). Guide rionali di Roma (in Italian). Vol. Borgo (III). Roma: Fratelli Palombi Editori. ISSN 0393-2710.
- Gigli, Laura (1994). Guide rionali di Roma (in Italian). Vol. Borgo (IV). Roma: Fratelli Palombi Editori. ISSN 0393-2710.
- Lombardi, Ferruccio (1996). Roma. Le chiese scomparse. La memoria storica della città (in Italian). Roma: Fratelli Palombi Editori. ISBN 978-88-7621-069-3.
