= Cristoforo Ambrogini =

Italian painter

Cristoforo Ambrogini (also Ambrosini or Ambrosi) was an Italian painter active in Rome in the late 16th - early 17th century. His only known works are the frescoes (also attributed to Giovanni Guerra) on the facade of the church of San Giacomo Scossacavalli in Rome, and those on the walls and the vault of the first chapel (dedicated to the Virgin Mary) of the right nave in the same church. The chapel was restructured in 1600 by architect Antonio Longhi and was thereafter decorated by Ambrogini. San Giacomo was destroyed in 1937 for the erection of Via della Conciliazione.

== Sources ==
- Gigli, Laura (1992). Guide rionali di Roma (in Italian). Vol. Borgo (III). Roma: Fratelli Palombi Editori. ISSN 0393-2710.
