= Villa di Pratolino =

Building in Vaglia, Italy

Coordinates: 43°51′36″N 11°18′09″E

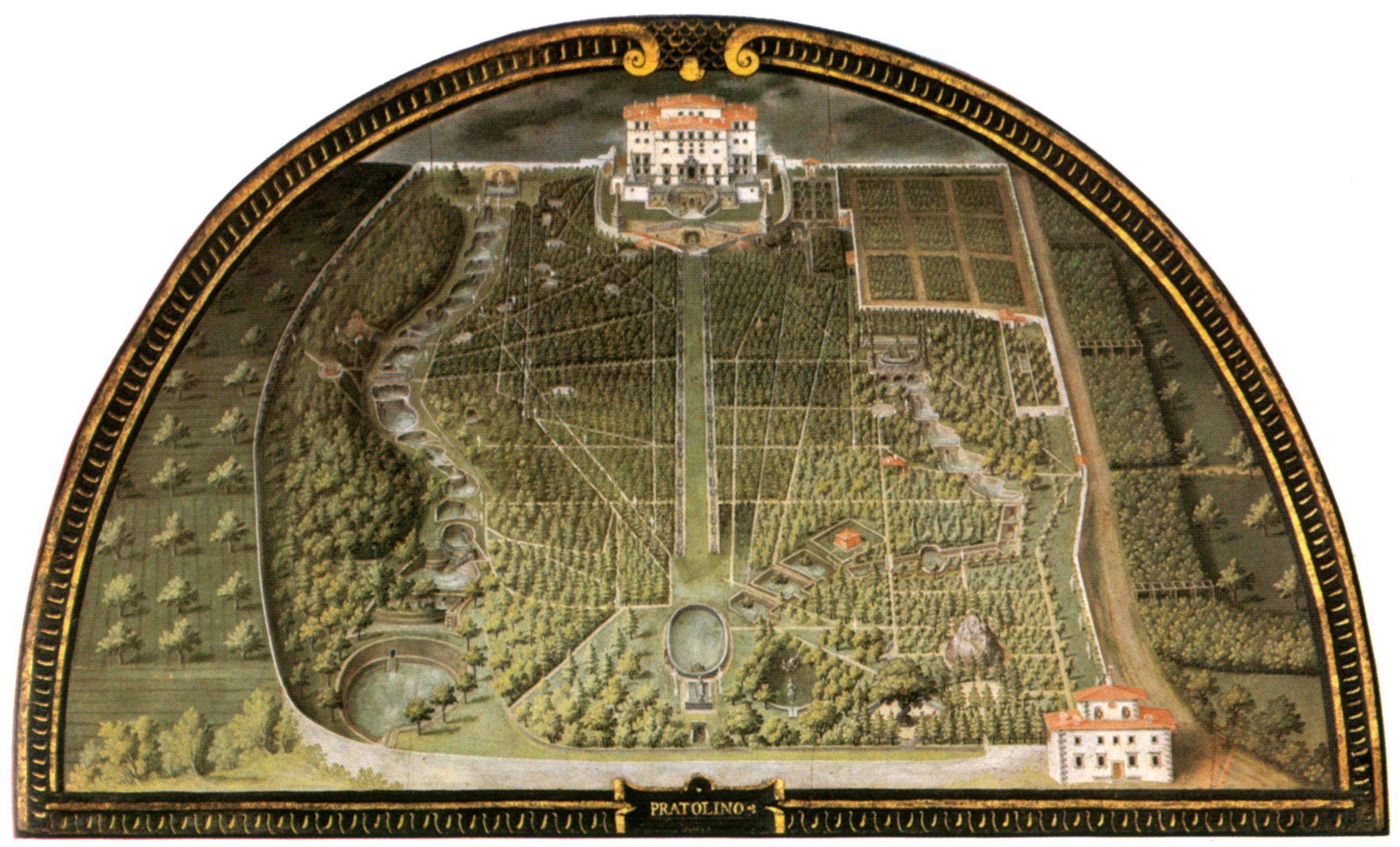
Pratolino, the lower half of the garden, by Giusto Utens, 1599 (Museo Topografico, Florence)

The Villa di Pratolino was a Renaissance patrician villa in Vaglia, Tuscany, Italy. It was mostly demolished in 1822. Its remains are now part of the Villa Demidoff, 12 km north of Florence, reached from the main road to Bologna.

== History ==
The villa was built by Francesco de' Medici, Grand Duke of Tuscany, in part to please his Venetian mistress, the celebrated Bianca Cappello. Villa and gardens were designed by his court architect, designer and engineer Bernardo Buontalenti, who completed the construction from 1569 to 1581. It was sufficiently finished to provide the setting for Francesco's public wedding to Bianca Cappello in 1579. In its time it was a splendid example of the Mannerist garden.

Francesco had assembled most of the property, which was not a hereditary Medici possession, by September 1568, and construction began the following spring.

The garden was laid out along a perfectly straight down-slope axis passing through the center of the villa, which stood midway. Down the central descent, the visitor still walks under a cooling arch of fountain jets, without getting wet.

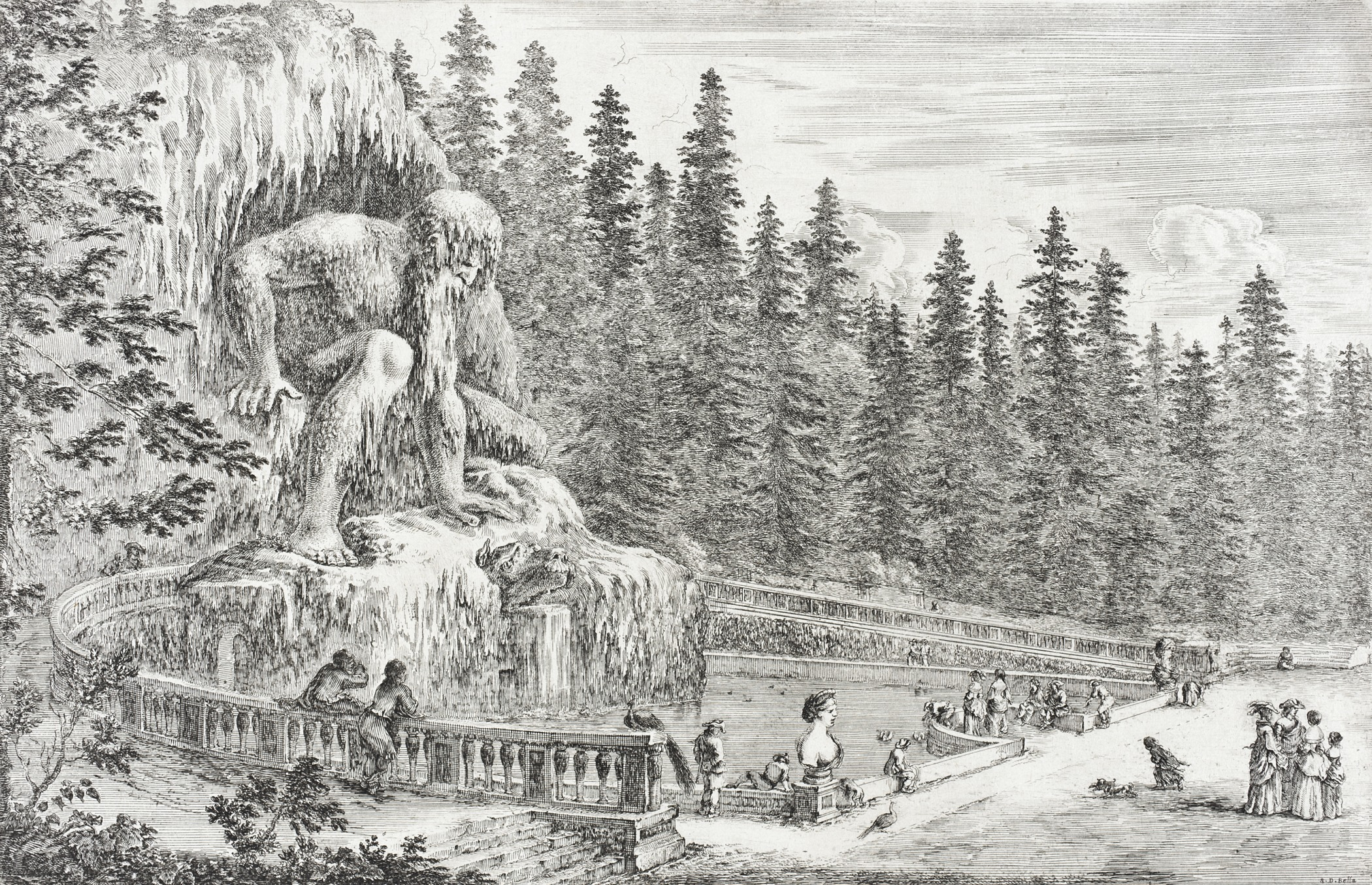
The "Apennine Colossus" in its niche

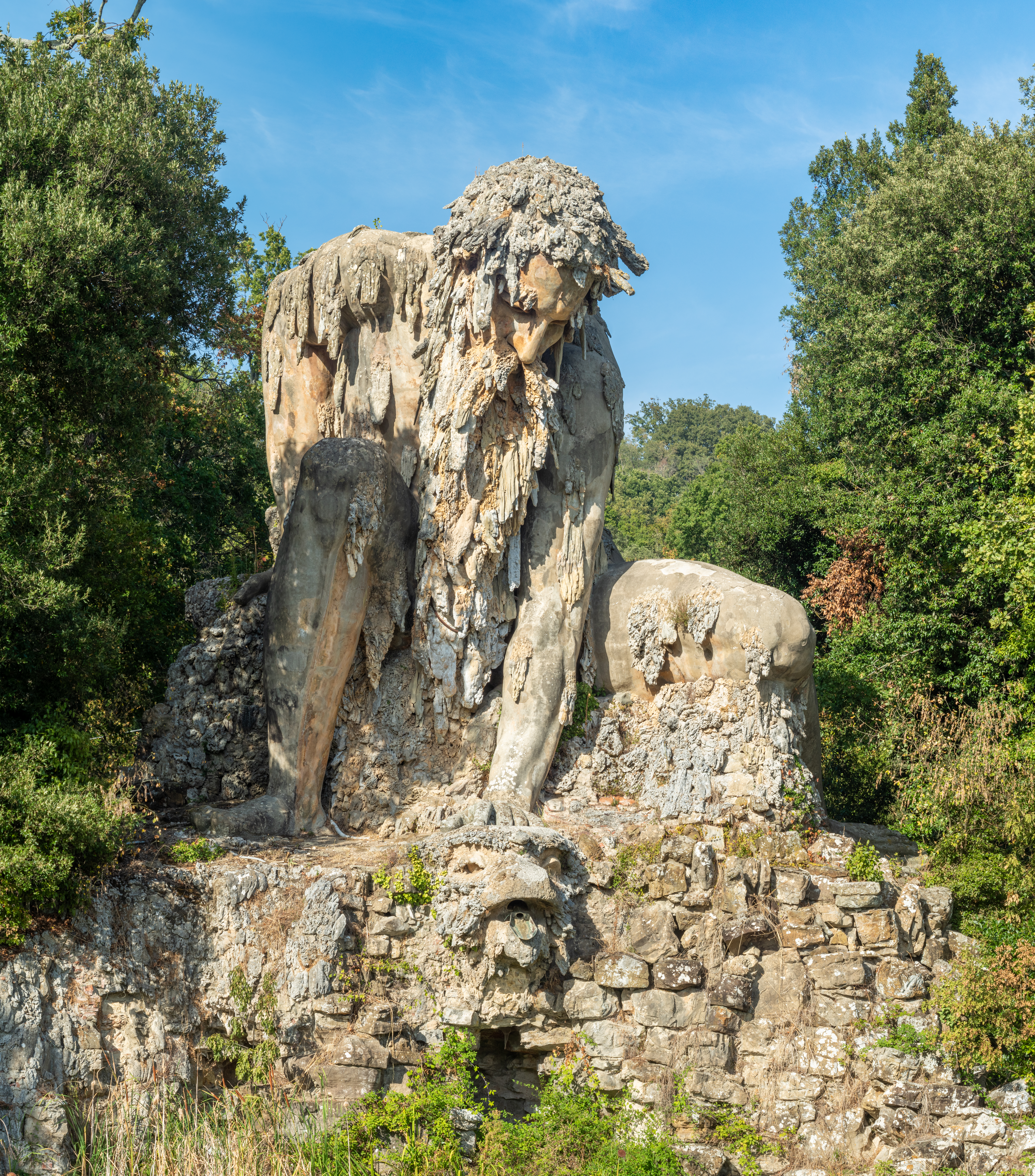
The "Apennine Colossus" by Giambologna

Michel de Montaigne, one of the earliest visitors to leave a description of Pratolino, saw it in 1581, and considered it to have been built, he thought when visiting Villa d'Este, "precisely in rivalry with this place". A long description was published by a Florentine, Francesco de' Vieri, in 1586. Giusto Utens included a view of the southern half of the villa and its gardens among his series of lunettes containing bird's-eye views of the Medicean villas painted in 1599. Stefano Della Bella made six etchings of the Pratolino's gardens in the mid-17th century, the picture is rounded out by further 18th century descriptions. Nevertheless, Pratolino has not survived, as other Medici villas have.

Though the villa and its fountains were kept in repair, after Francesco's death it was deserted. The Pratolino appeared to be closely designed to please the original owner and in later periods many of its features were seen as too expensive to maintain. In 1773, some of its sculptures were removed to adorn the extension of the Boboli Gardens and the place was left to fall into decay; by 1798 a German visitor was impressed with the romantic ruin of it. Grand Duke Ferdinand III decided to capitalize on the air of overgrown wildness; in 1820 it was decided to demolish the villa, and the garden was then re-designed in the English landscape manner and became one of the most romantic gardens ever seen in Tuscany. In 1872 the complex was sold by the heirs of Leopold II, former Grand Duke of Tuscany, to Prince Pavel Pavlovich Demidov who restored the Paggeria, or pages' lodgings of the former residence, as the Villa Demidoff di Pratolino. The property was eventually inherited by Prince Paul of Yugoslavia. Later the park was bought by the province of Florence who maintain the park and open it for public use from April through October.

The complicated iconography of the garden is embodied in the brooding statue of "Appennino", a colossal sculpture by Giambologna built in 1579–1580, which originally seemed to emerge from the vaulted rockwork niche that once surrounded him. Multiple grottoes with water-driven automata, a water organ, surprise jets that drenched visitors' finery when the fontanieri opened secret spigots, offered striking juxtapositions of Art with imitations of rugged Nature.

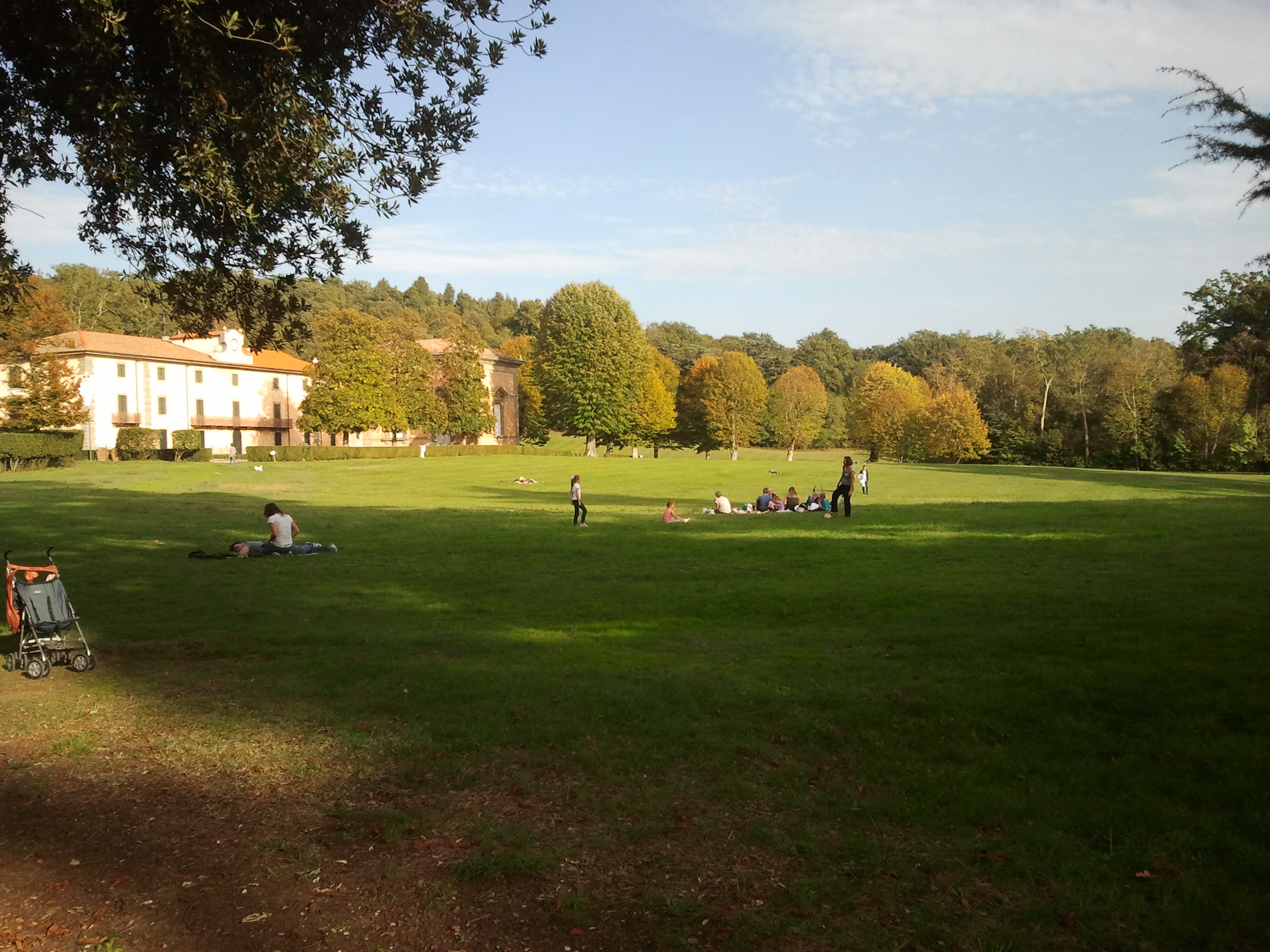
The park and Villa Demidoff, which is the restored Paggeria of Villa di Pratolino.

== See also ==
- Medici villas
- Villa Feri
