= Barbetti =

Barbetti is an Italian surname that may refer to the following notable people:

- Cesare Barbetti (1930–2006), Italian actor and voice actor
- Rinaldo Barbetti (1830-c.1904), Italian sculptor, designer and illustrator
