= Hamilton Place, London =

Street in the City of Westminster, London

Coordinates: 51°30′14.6″N 0°09′00.2″W

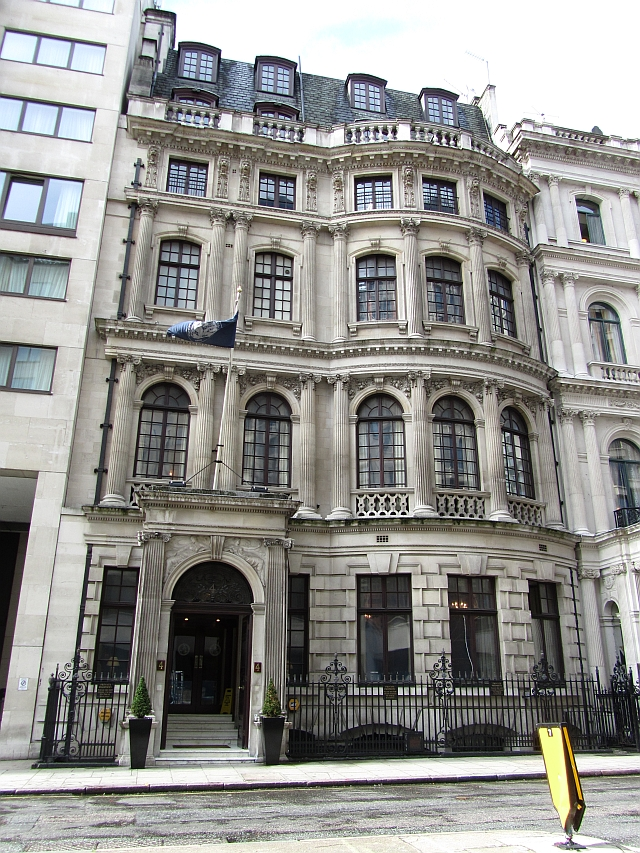
Number 4 Hamilton Place

Hamilton Place, City of Westminster is a side street off Piccadilly close to Hyde Park Corner, London.

Hamilton Place is a short street (about 400 feet (120 m) long) and the first street east of Park Lane. It is one of the most prestigious streets in London with three five-star hotels: the London Intercontinental Hotel at no. 1, the London Hilton at no. 22. and the Four Seasons at Hamilton Place. The Les Ambassadeurs Club casino and club is located at No. 5 in a house built by Thomas Leverton and remodelled in the Venetian Renaissance style with Louis XV and fin de siecle interior decoration for Leopold de Rothschild. No. 4 is home to the headquarters of the Royal Aeronautical Society.

Its name derived from the Hamilton family who had a residence there. During the Interregnum, buildings were erected for the first time between Hyde Park Corner and what is now Old Regent Street. After the Restoration they were leased from the Crown by James Hamilton (died 1673) a courtier during the reign of Charles II who held the position of Hyde Park Ranger. The lease was renewed for a period of 99 years by Elizabeth his widow in 1692.

== Notes ==
- Knight, Charles, ed. (1851), Knight's cyclopædia of London, London, p. 789
- Walford, Edward (1878), "Hyde Park", Old and New London, vol. 4, pp. 375–405
