= Palazzo di Bianca Cappello =

Coordinates: 43°46′1.31″N 11°14′56.54″E

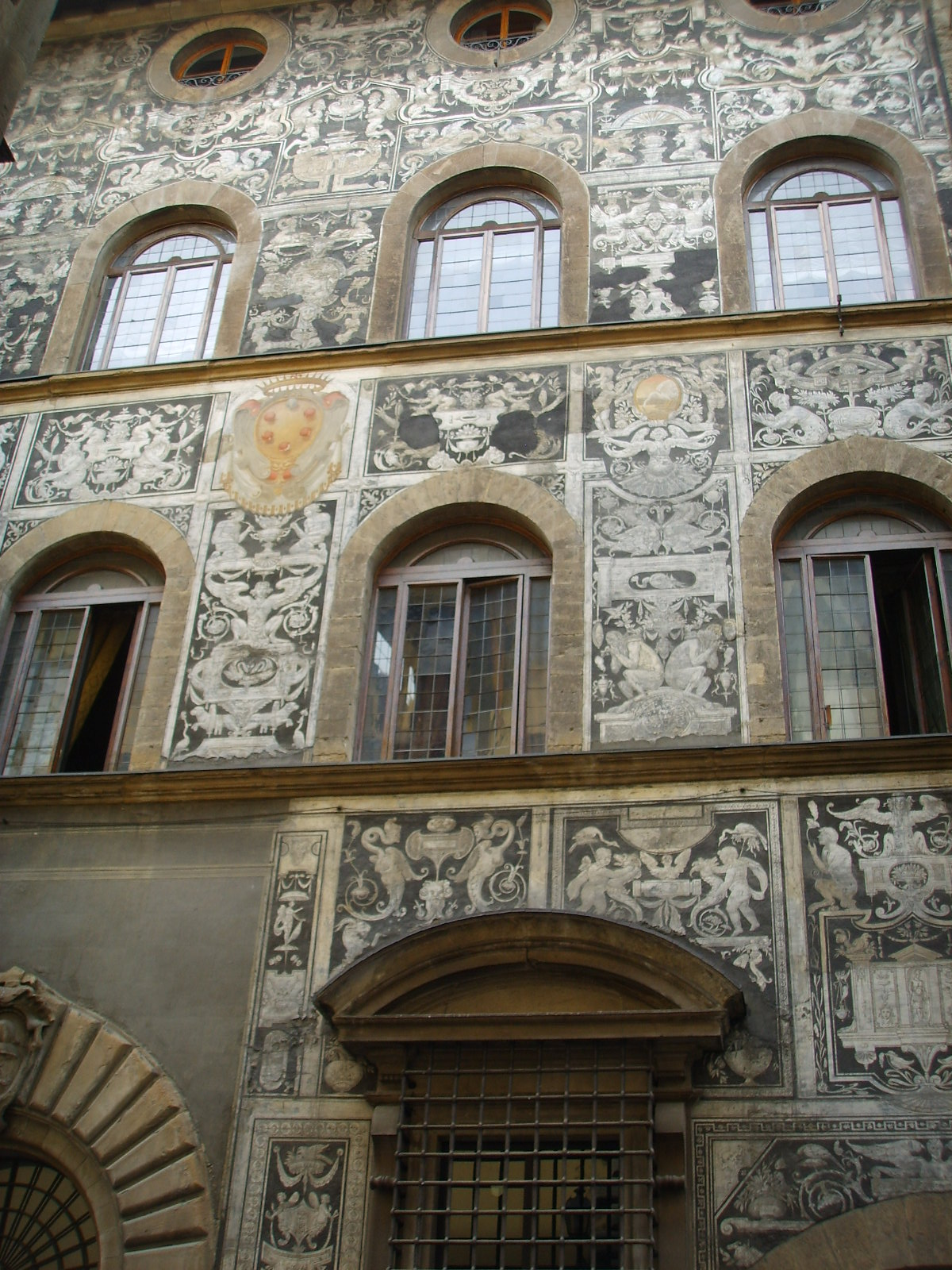
Palazzo di Bianca Cappello, graffiti

The Palazzo di Bianca Cappello, originally belonging to Corbinelli family is a Renaissance-style palace located on Via Maggio #26 of the quarter of Oltrarno in Florence, region of Tuscany, Italy. It is notable for its facade decoration, and once housing Bianca Cappello, the mistress, then wife of the Grand-Duke Francesco I de' Medici

== History ==
The house, which was near the Grand-Duke's Palazzo Pitti, was acquired in 1566 and refurbished for Bianca Capello, who utilized the architectural work (1570–1574) of Bernardo Buontalenti. The palace was ceded by the Capello to the Ospedale di Santa Maria Nuova, and soon thereafter (1579–1580) the facade graffito was decorated by Bernardino Poccetti. The palace later came into possession of the Riccardi family, then Carlo Lasinio, professor of the Florentine Accademia di Belle Arti. It now belongs to the Comune of Florence, who have made it the archive and laboratory of conservation of books of the Gabinetto Vieusseux.

Across the street is the Palazzo Ridolfi (Via di Maggio #13), designed by Santi di Tito. On the same side of the street is Palazzo Machiavelli (#16-18), now an Anglican church.

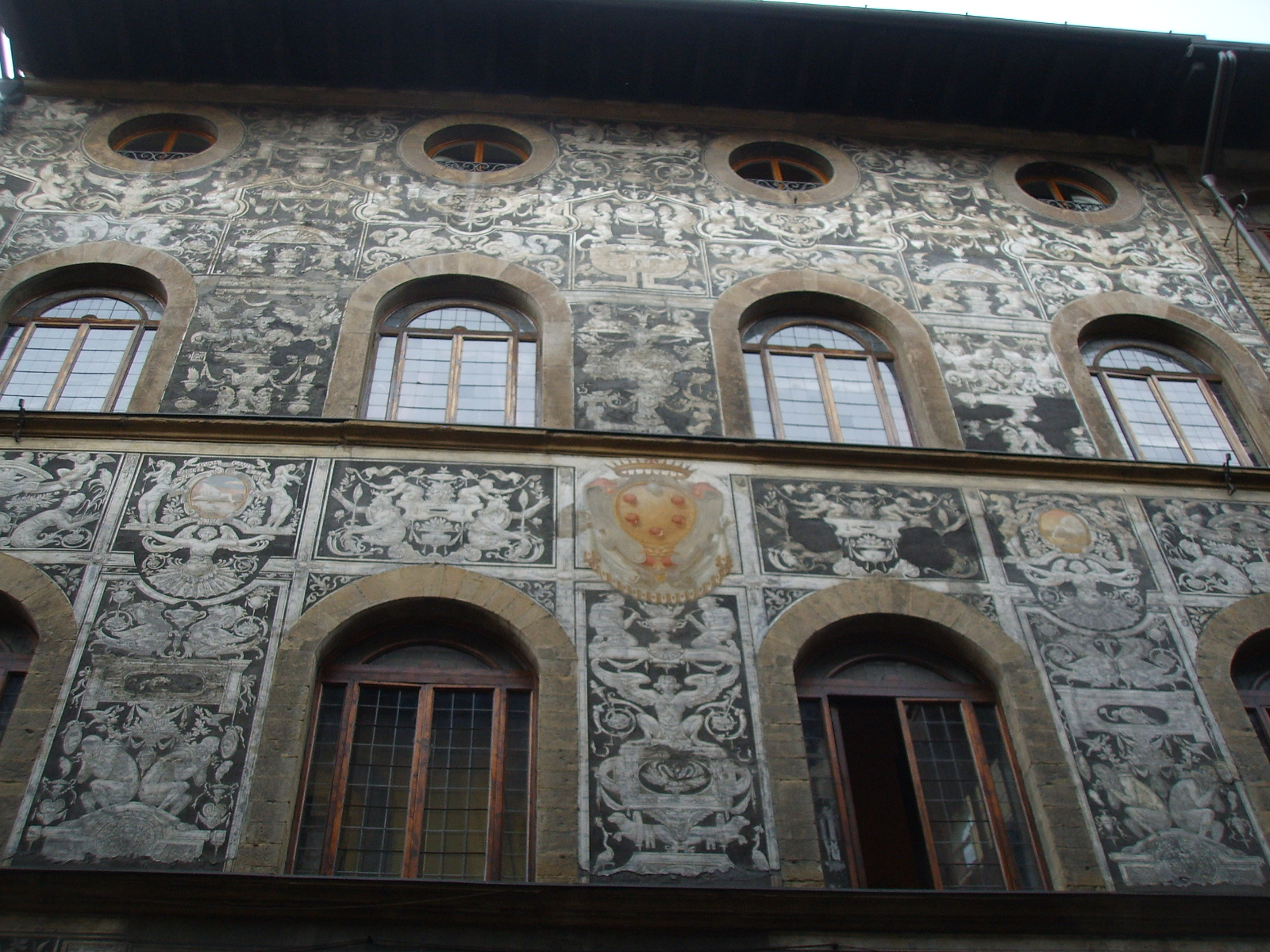
Facade

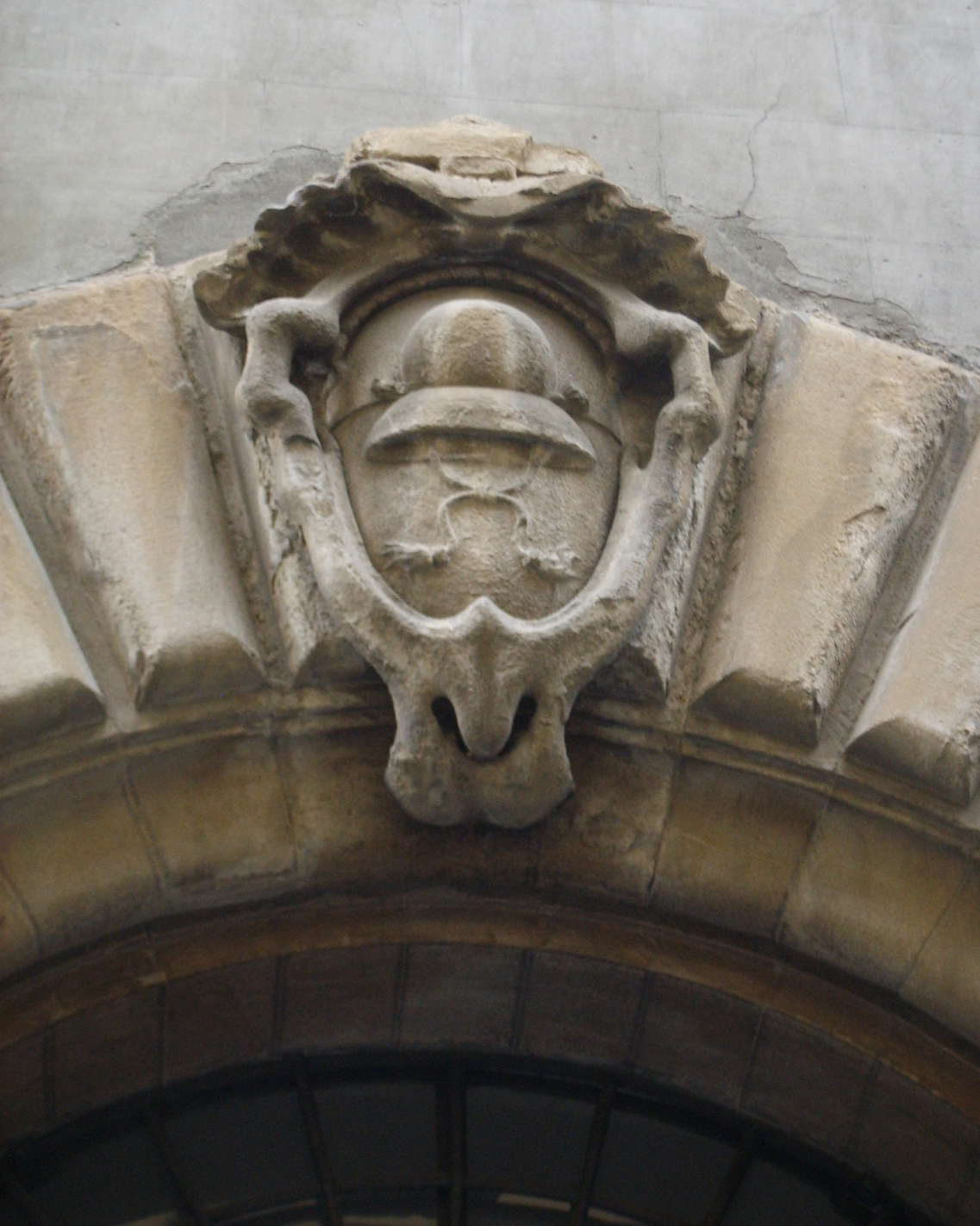
Heraldic shield of Cappello

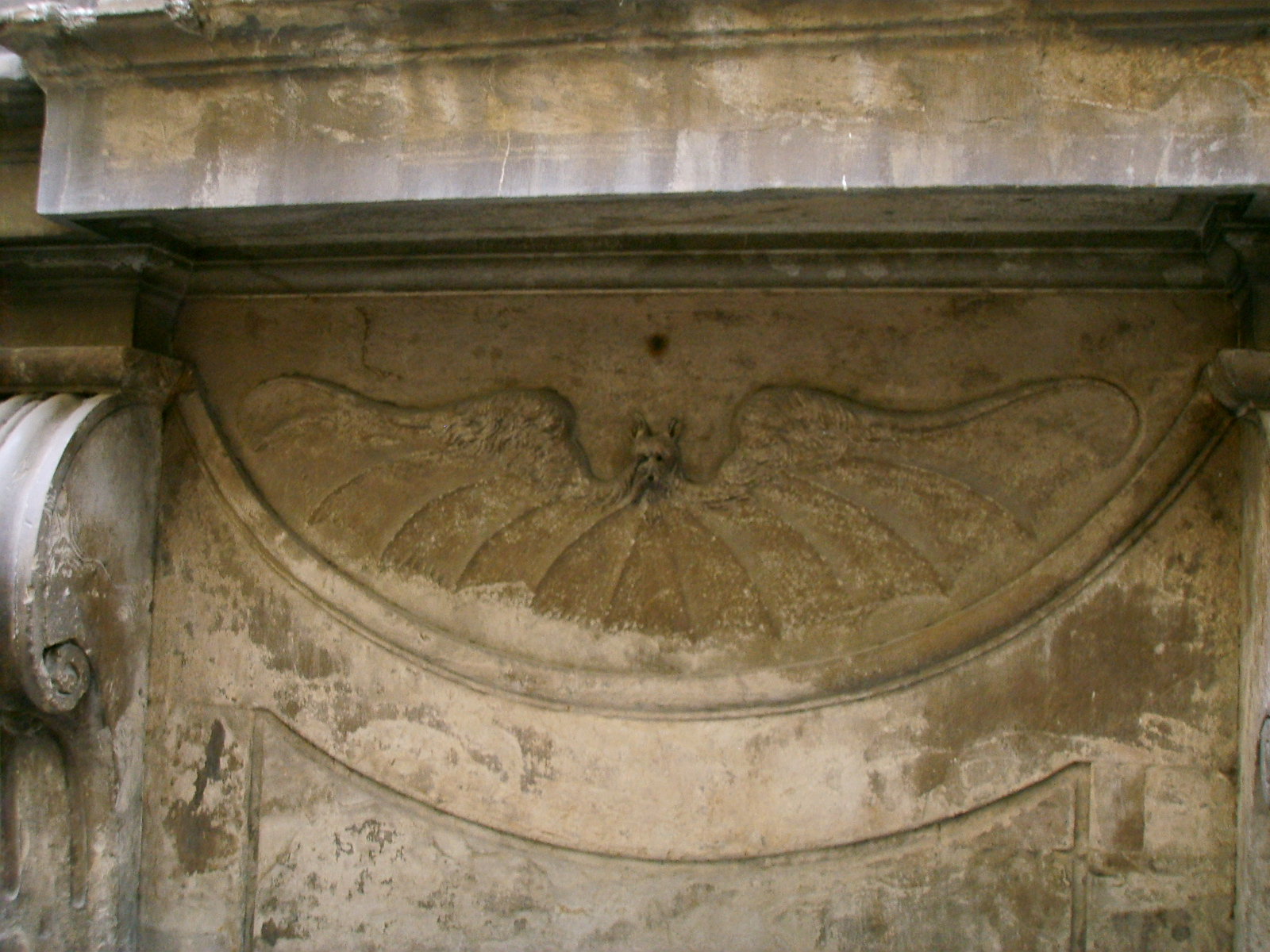
Architectural detail

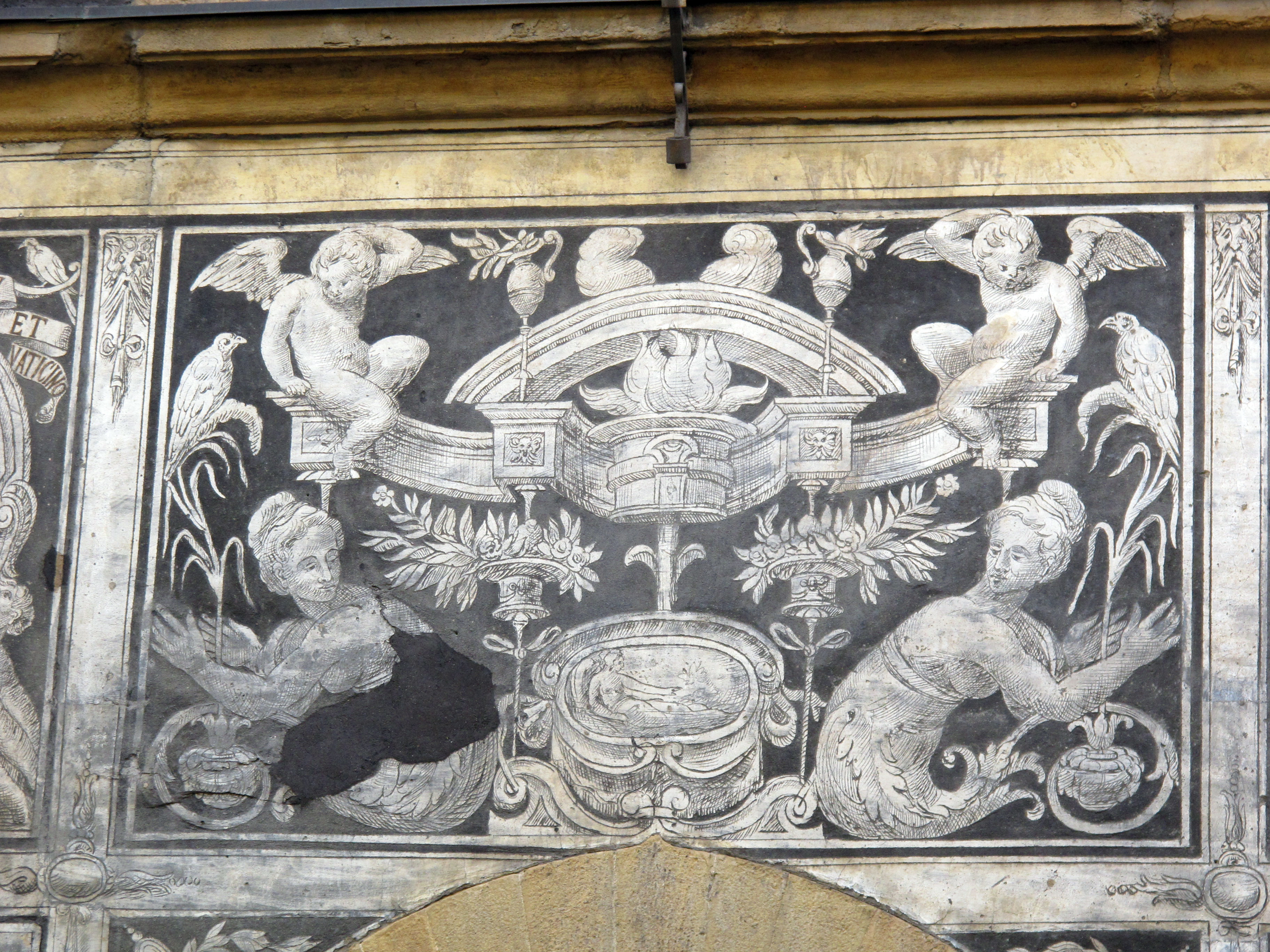
Detail of Graffito

== Bibliography ==
- Marcello Vannucci, Splendidi palazzi di Firenze, Le Lettere, Firenze 1995.
