= Giovanni Battista Ricci =

Italian painter (1537–1627)

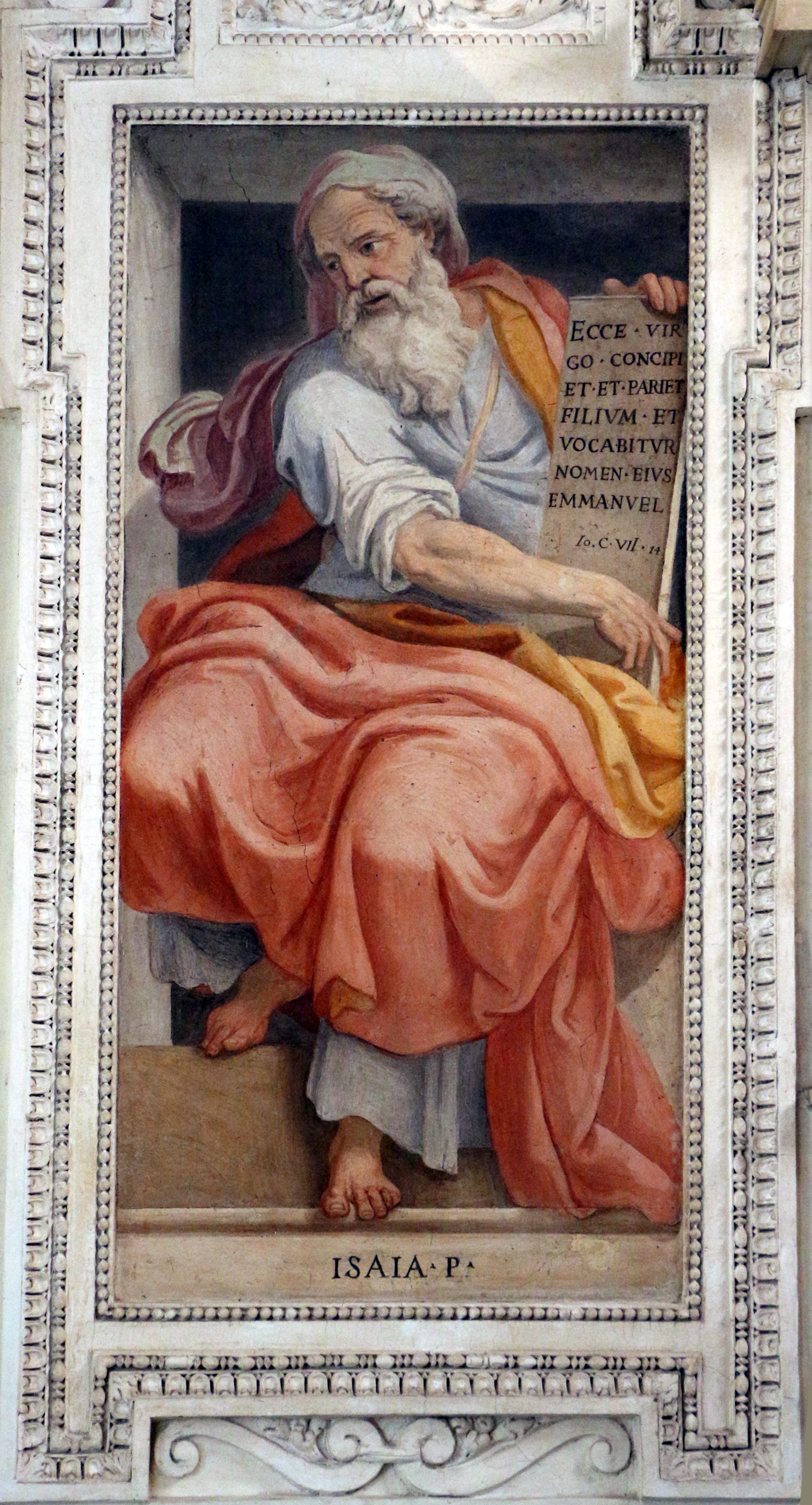
Giovanni Battista Ricci and Cristoforo Greppi, frescos in San Francesco a Ripa, Rome

Giovanni Battista Ricci (Novara, circa 1537 – Rome, 1627) nicknamed Il Novara after his birth town, was an Italian painter of the late-Mannerist and early-Baroque period, active mainly in Rome.

== Biography ==
He was born in Novara or in Suno, in the present-day Province of Novara. In 1576 he and Bernardino Lanino were commissioned some paintings (perhaps Novara's Crocifissione tra santi) for the Saint Benedict Chapel of the duomo of Novara. In 1578 was registered the dowry for his wife, Cassandra Cattanea (Cattanei), originally from and resident in Novara.

Ricci moved to Rome from his native Piedmont, followed by his wife, before 1581, during the papacy of Gregory XIII and was registered with the guild of painters by 1581. He was active in the fresco decoration (1590-1593) of the Scala Sancta in Santa Maria Maggiore, in the decoration (1597-1613) of San Marcello, and (1619) Santa Maria in Traspontina. He was influenced by Federico Zuccari. He also painted in the Vatican Library and the church of Santissima Trinità dei Pellegrini. In 1617–1620, Ricci collaborated with Cristoforo Greppi, a painter from Lombardy, in designing and painting the frescoes for the Castellani Chapel in San Francesco a Ripa. Ricci and his assistants executed several frescoes and paintings in the church of San Giacomo Scossacavalli in Borgo, destroyed in 1937. Ricci was an excellent draftsman, working primarily in pen and brown ink, although a handful of studies in chalk are also known.
