= Apennine Colossus =

Statue in Tuscany, Italy

- Colosso dell'Appennino (Italian)
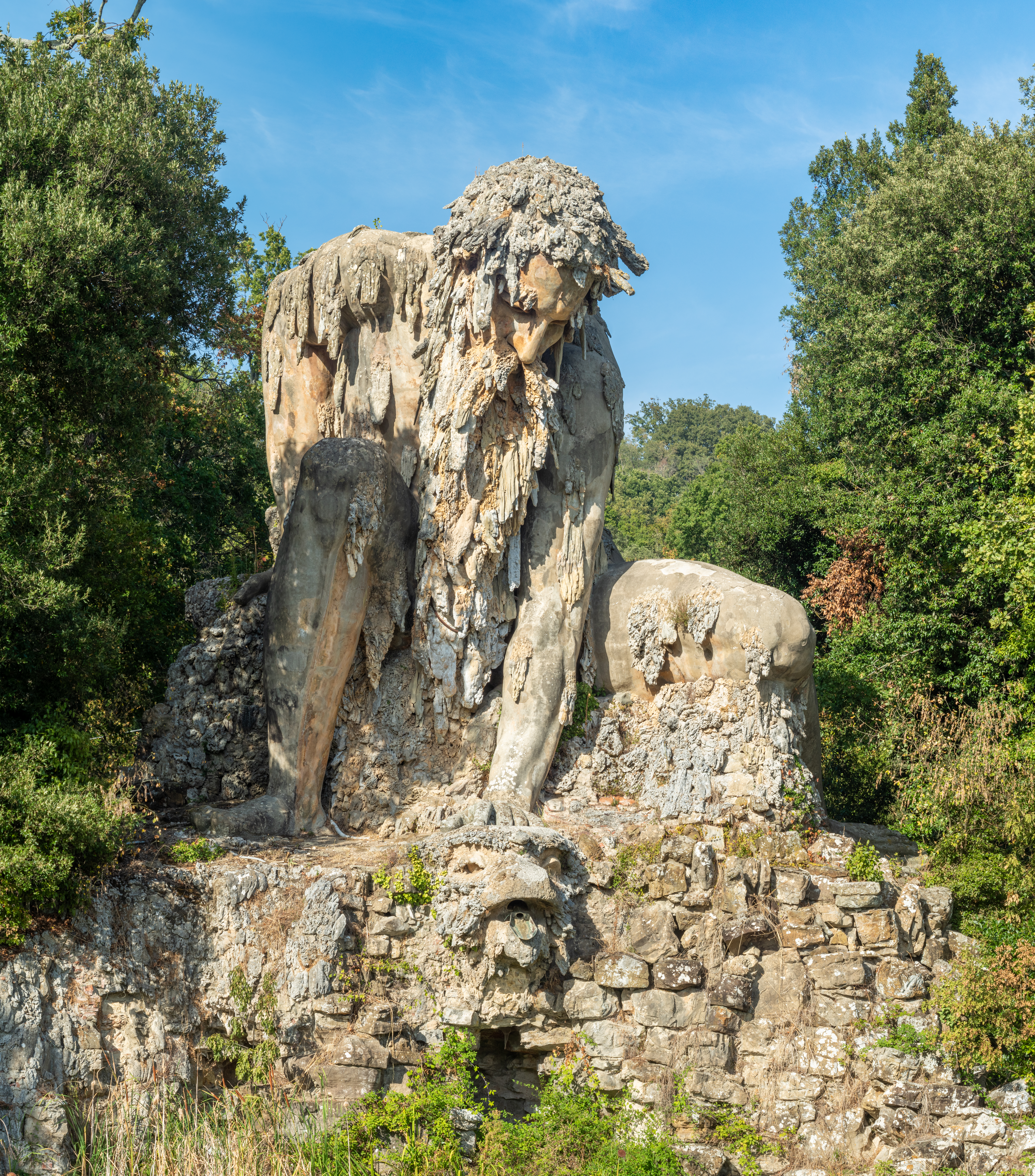
- Colossus of Apennine
- Artists: Jean de Boulogne, a.k.a. Giambologna
- Completion date: late 1580s
- Medium: Stone
- Dimensions: 11 meters (36 feet)
- Location: Vaglia, Italy; 43°51′34″N 11°18′16″E

The Apennine Colossus (Italian: Colosso dell'Appennino) is a stone statue, approximately 11 meters high, in the estate of the Villa Demidoff in Vaglia, Tuscany, Italy. Giambologna (Flemish sculptor Jean de Boulogne) created the colossal figure, a personification of the Apennine Mountains, in the late 1580s. It was constructed on the grounds of the Villa di Pratolino, a Renaissance villa that fell into disrepair and was replaced by the Villa Demidoff in the 1800s.

== Description ==
The colossus is about 11 metres (36 ft) high and is meant as a personification of the Apennine Mountains. It was the water source for the Pratolino, its fountains and secret water plays. The colossus has the appearance of an elderly man crouched at the shore of a lake and is surrounded by other sculptures depicting mythological themes from Ovid's Metamorphoses including Pegasus, Parnassus or Jupiter. It is presumed that Giambologna was inspired by the description of a mountain-like Atlas in Ovid's Metamorphoses, when he designed the figure of Apennine. Other sources cite the Atlas as described in the Aeneid of the Roman poet Virgil as an inspiration. With his left hand in front of him, the Apennine seems to squeeze the head of a sea monster through whose open mouth water emanates into the pond ahead of the statue. The stone colossus is depicted naked, with stalactites in the thick beard and long hair to show the metamorphosis of man and mountain, blending his body with the surrounding nature, populated by aquatic vegetation. The statue is described to originally have been emerging from its environment like being alive. The giant was able to sweat and weep over a network of water pipes. In the winter season, icicles would cover his body. The work was made of stone and plaster and appearing to be partially covered with moss and lichens.

Within the giant exist a series of chambers and caves on three levels. In the ground floor of the colossus exists a cave containing an octagonal fountain dedicated to the Greek goddess Thetys. The Italian painter Jacopo Ligozzi adorned the Grotto de Thetys with frescos of villages from the Mediterranean coast of Tuscany in 1586. In other chambers mining scenes based on the book De re metallica by the mineralogist Georgius Agricola were to be seen. In the giant's upper floor is a chamber big enough for a small orchestra and in the head a small chamber holds a fireplace out of which the smoke would escape through his nostrils. The chamber in the head had slits in the ears and the eyes. Francesco I de Medici, Grand Duke of Tuscany, enjoyed fishing while sitting in the head chamber, throwing the fishing line through one of the eye slits. At night the chamber was illuminated with torches, following which the eyes appeared to glow in the dark. Initially, the back of the Colossus was protected by a structure resembling a cave, as seen on an etching by Stefano della Bella. As Giambologna was an admirer of the Italian sculptor Michelangelo the cave-like structure was also compared with Michelangelo's style of the non-finito. On top of it, there was a terrace. The cave-resembling structure was demolished around 1690 by the sculptor Giovan Battista Foggini, who also built a statue of a dragon to adorn the back of the colossus. The dragon was described to have been a fountain, but it is assumed the dragon's belly was transformed into a fireplace while the dragon's neck and head had the function of its chimney. In 1876, the Italian sculptor Rinaldo Barbetti renovated the statue.

== Location and ownership ==
The Pratolino is located about 10 kilometres (6.2 mi) north of Florence at the foot of the Apennine mountain range. In it, there is a rectangular square called the Prato del Appennino, situated in front of the colossus.

After Francesco de' Medici's death in 1587 and that of his wife Bianca Capello the next day, the villa and its surroundings fell into decay. The Villa di Pratolino was demolished in 1822 and in 1872, the heirs of Leopold II, Grand Duke of Tuscany, sold the estate to the Demidoff family who built their own villa on it. In 1981, the Villa Demidoff was purchased by the Province of Florence and today the park and its giant are accessible to the public.

== Gallery ==
Etching by Stefano Della Bella

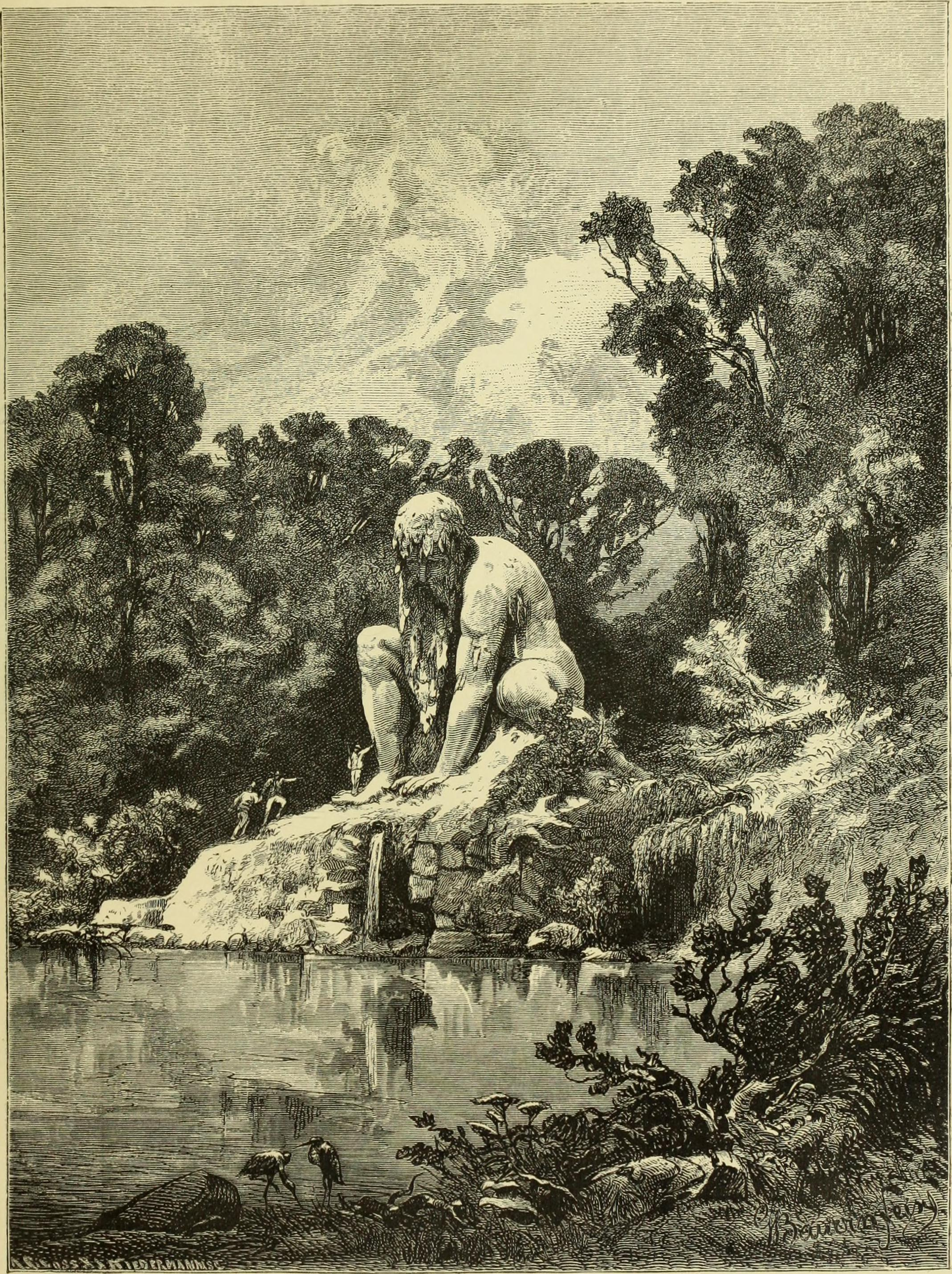

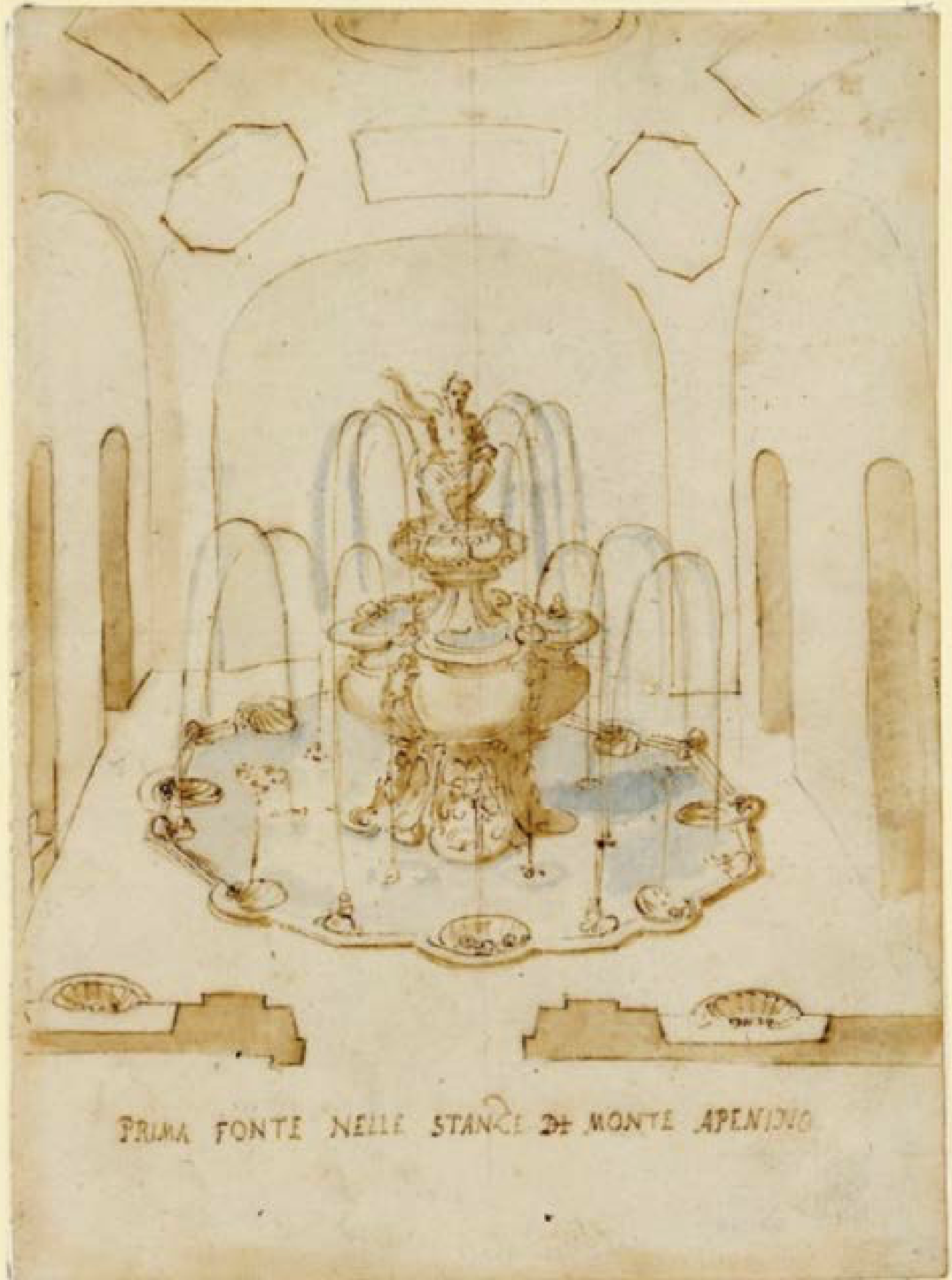
Fountain of Thetys in the ground floor by Giovanni Guerra

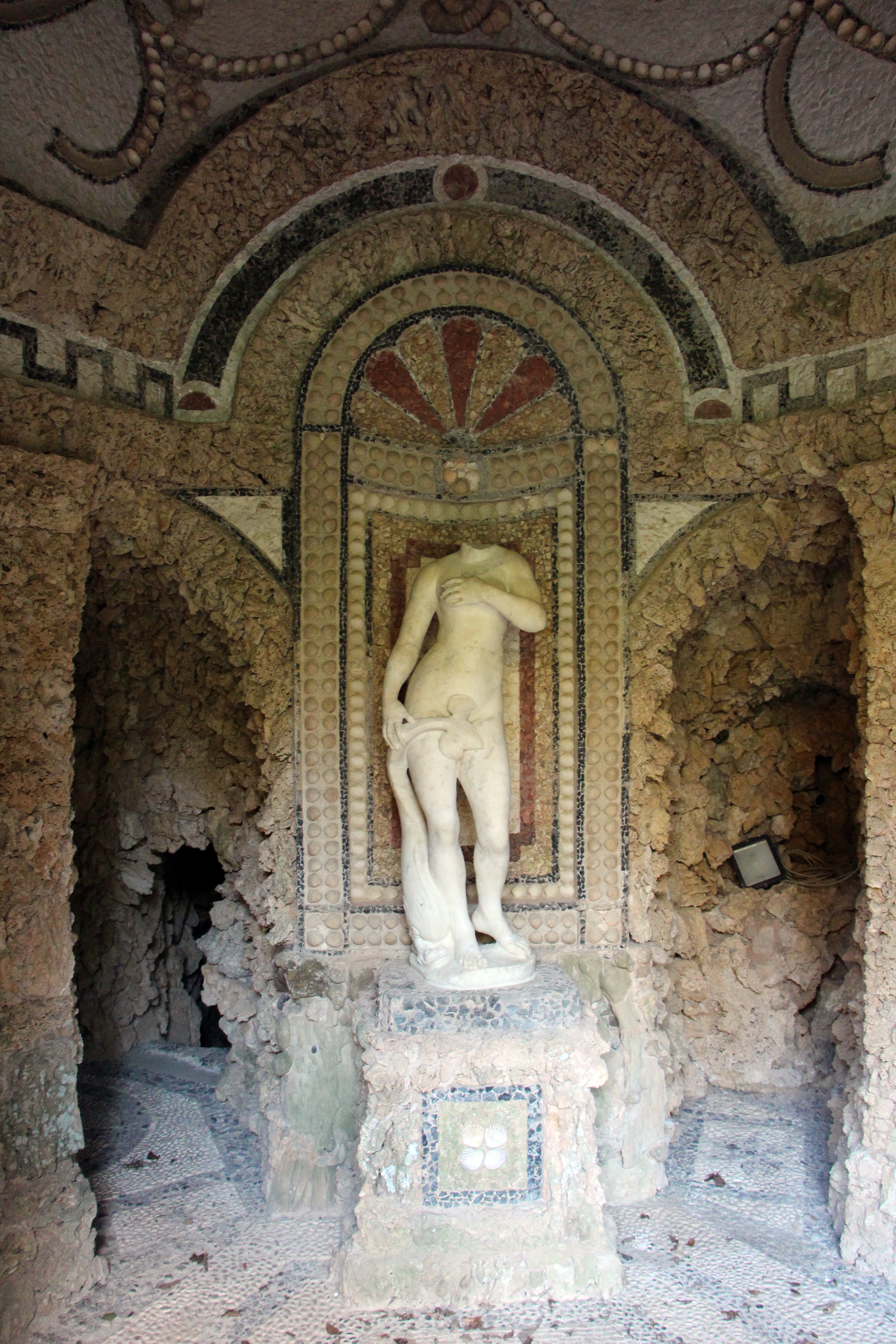
Upper chamber within the statue

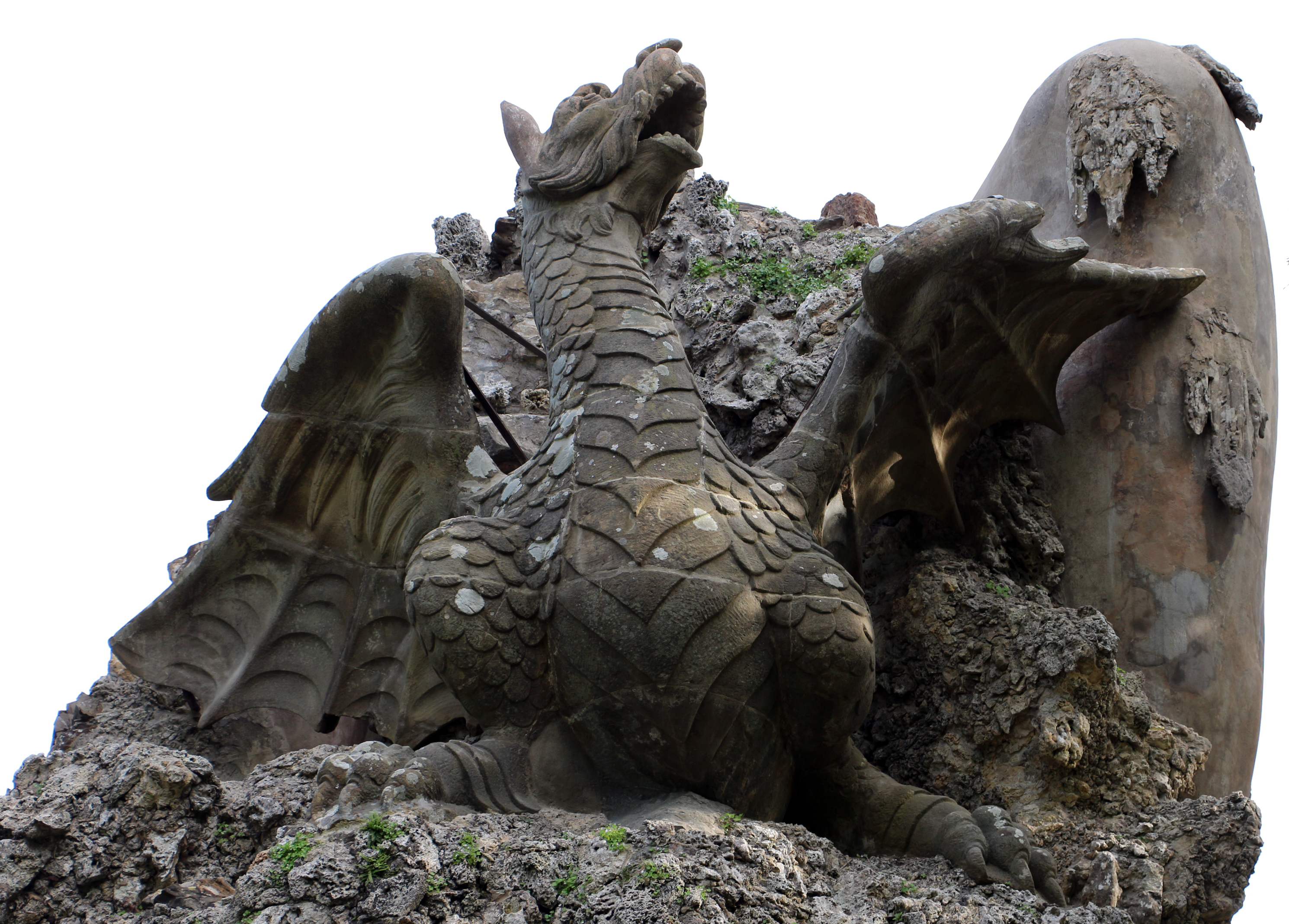
Dragon at the back of the Colossus by Giovanni Battista Foggini
