= Les Ambassadeurs Club =

London club and casino

Coordinates: 51°30′16″N 00°09′02″W

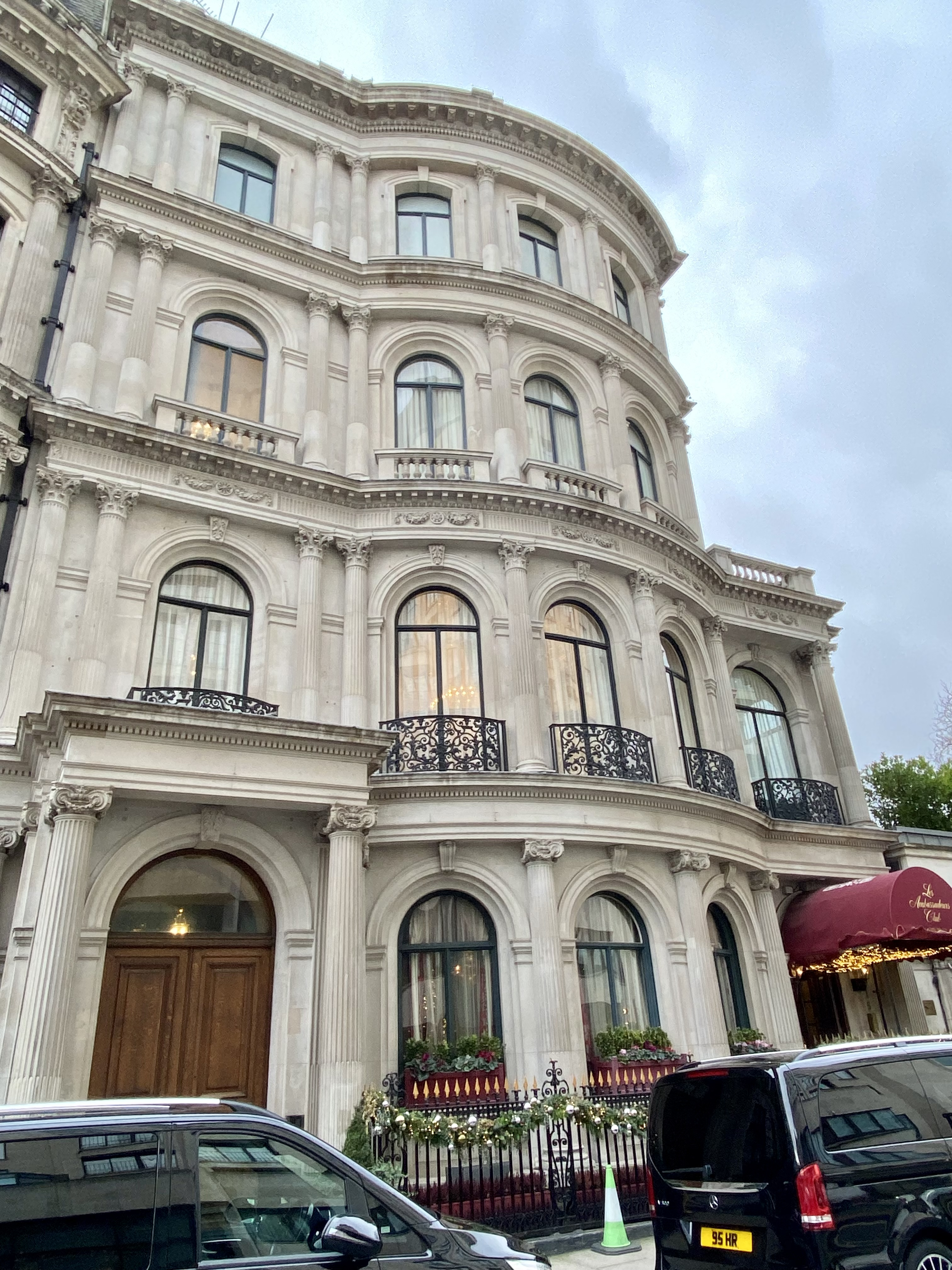
Les Ambassadeurs Club in 2023

Les Ambassadeurs Club (also known as "Les A") is a private club and casino located at 5 Hamilton Place in the Mayfair area of London, England.

The club was originally established on Hanover Square in 1941 by John Mills, and it has had several owners since Mills sold it in 1981. The club moved to 5 Hamilton Place in 1950, and Le Cercle casino was established at the club in 1961. The Milroy and Garrison nightclubs have also been based at 5 Hamilton Place. The club was portrayed in the inaugural James Bond film, Dr. No, and scenes from The Beatles' film A Hard Day's Night were filmed at the club.

== History ==
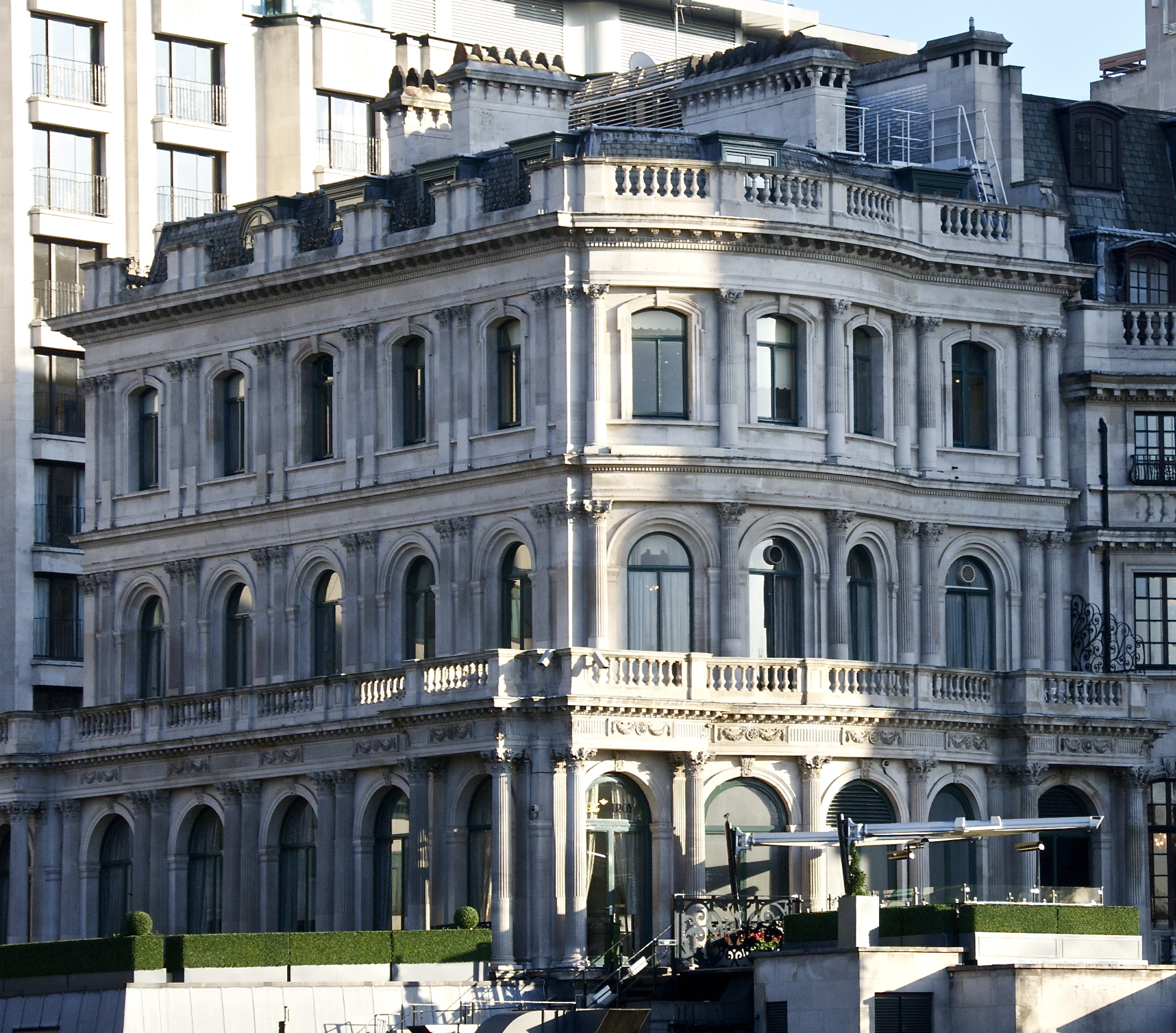
The rear of the club from Park Lane

The building at 5 Hamilton Place was built between 1807 and 1810 by Thomas Leverton and remodelled in the Venetian Renaissance style by W. R. Rogers of William Cubitt for Leopold de Rothschild. Interior decoration in the Louis XV and fin de siècle style was completed by John Jackson, Mellier, Forsythe. The interior is noted for its fine workmanship, including an oak staircase with excessively scrolled balustrade. The woodwork in the library was completed in the Florentine studios of Chevalier Rinaldo Barbetti. It is listed Grade II* on the National Heritage List for England. The oval ceiling fresco in the Marble Room was painted by Edmund Thomas Parris in the 1830s.

The main gaming floor of the club has sixteen tables, where American roulette, baccarat, blackjack and Three Card Poker can be played. Roulette and more discreet games of cards can be played in the club's Marble Room. The club has a garden area, where players can smoke while placing their bets. The club's Red Room has a separate entrance at 6 Hamilton Place.

=== Early years ===
Les Ambassadeurs was first opened on Hanover Square in 1941 by the Polish-born soldier and businessman John Mills (born Jean-Jean Millstein). Mills also co-owned the Milroy Nightclub on Stratton Street in Mayfair with bandleader Harry Roy. The club was memorably visited in October 1948 by actress Pat Kirkwood, accompanied by the high society photographer Baron and Prince Philip, Duke of Edinburgh. The group dined at Les Ambassadeurs before dancing at the Milroy. Kirkwood danced with Philip, to the shock of onlookers, and this incurred the displeasure of King George VI. Christopher Lee kept a bottle of gin with his name on it at the club. The screenwriter Charles Bennett said of the Milroy during the Second World War that "Scotch whiskey and champagne flowed like the Niagara river rapids. Nero fiddled while Rome burned, and if there was death outside in darkest London, within the warmth and brilliance of the Milroy there was food, drink and dancing".

The club refused to admit Jewish members until as late as 1943.

Les Ambassadeurs and the Milroy were relocated to No. 5 Hamilton Place, off Park Lane, in 1950 with the lease bought for £40,000 (equivalent to £1,183,997 in 2025). The band at the Milroy was led by Stephane Grappelli in the early 1950s.

Le Cercle gaming club for members of Les Ambassadeurs was established at the club in May 1961 after the passing of the Betting and Gaming Act 1960. The Garrison Room, a nightclub, was established in the basement of the building. Mills was subsequently convicted in 1963 at Bow Street Magistrates' Court under the Betting and Gaming Act in a case involving the legality of charges imposed in Chemin de fer at Le Cercle but his appeal was successfully heard at the Queen's Bench Division of the High Court of Justice in December 1963 in Mills v. Mackinnon. John Stanley, 18th Earl of Derby lost £165,000 in an evening gambling at the club in the 1960s. The extent of Derby's losses caused the souring of Mills's relationship with fellow casino owner John Aspinall, who had previously had Derby as a regular patron. Le Cercle lost their gambling licence in 1978 following convictions against the company and a former manager for breaches of the gaming act.

=== Recent years ===
Mills ran the casino until 1981, when the leasehold was bought by casino group London Clubs International. In 2006, Les Ambassadeurs was sold to the Indonesian businessman Putera Sampoerna for £115 million. The freehold of 5 Hamilton Place was put up for sale for £50 million by the Crown Estate in 2012. In 2016, it was announced that all the shares were to be purchased by Hong Kong listed Landing International Development Ltd. This move was designed to focus on the Asian market opportunities in London. Les Ambassadeurs has since been sold to another Chinese business person, Paul Ho Chung Suen, who also owns Birmingham City F.C.

Notable members of the club have included film producer Betty Box, bookmaker Victor Chandler, football manager Alex Ferguson, businessman Philip Green, attorney general Michael Havers, Baron Havers, entrepreneurs Robert and Vincent Tchenguiz, and football agent Pini Zahavi. The negotiations for José Mourinho to become the manager of Chelsea F.C. took place at the club in 2004 between Mourinho, his agent Jorge Mendes, and Zahavi. In 2004, Philip Green won £2 million playing roulette at the club, and in 2006, as he celebrated with friends at Les Ambassadeurs after receiving his knighthood, Green initially lost £700,000 at blackjack before recovering the sum through roulette. A 2007 article in The Evening Standard described Les Ambassadeurs as attracting a predominantly Middle Eastern clientele of "Kuwaitis, Saudis, and Iranian Jews", and that a 2005 profit warning from the club was partially caused by a decline in gambling revenues during Ramadan.

The building formerly had a garden that extended into what is now Park Lane; the garden was reduced in size when Park Lane was widened in the 1960s. A ground floor extension was later built, and this stood until replaced with a terrace and green roof in 2014.

== In popular culture ==
The club was portrayed in the inaugural James Bond film, Dr. No (1962). A set built at Pinewood Studios and designed by Ken Adam was based on Les Ambassadeurs. Bond, portrayed by Sean Connery, and playing chemin de fer, introduces himself for the first time in the film franchise.

Two scenes in The Beatles' 1964 film A Hard Day's Night were filmed at Les Ambassadeurs. The Beatles are shown dancing to "I Wanna Be Your Man" and "Don't Bother Me" in the Garrison Room and find Wilfrid Brambell at the Le Cercle gaming tables. The scenes were shot in March and April 1964.
