= Cristoforo Greppi =

Italian painter

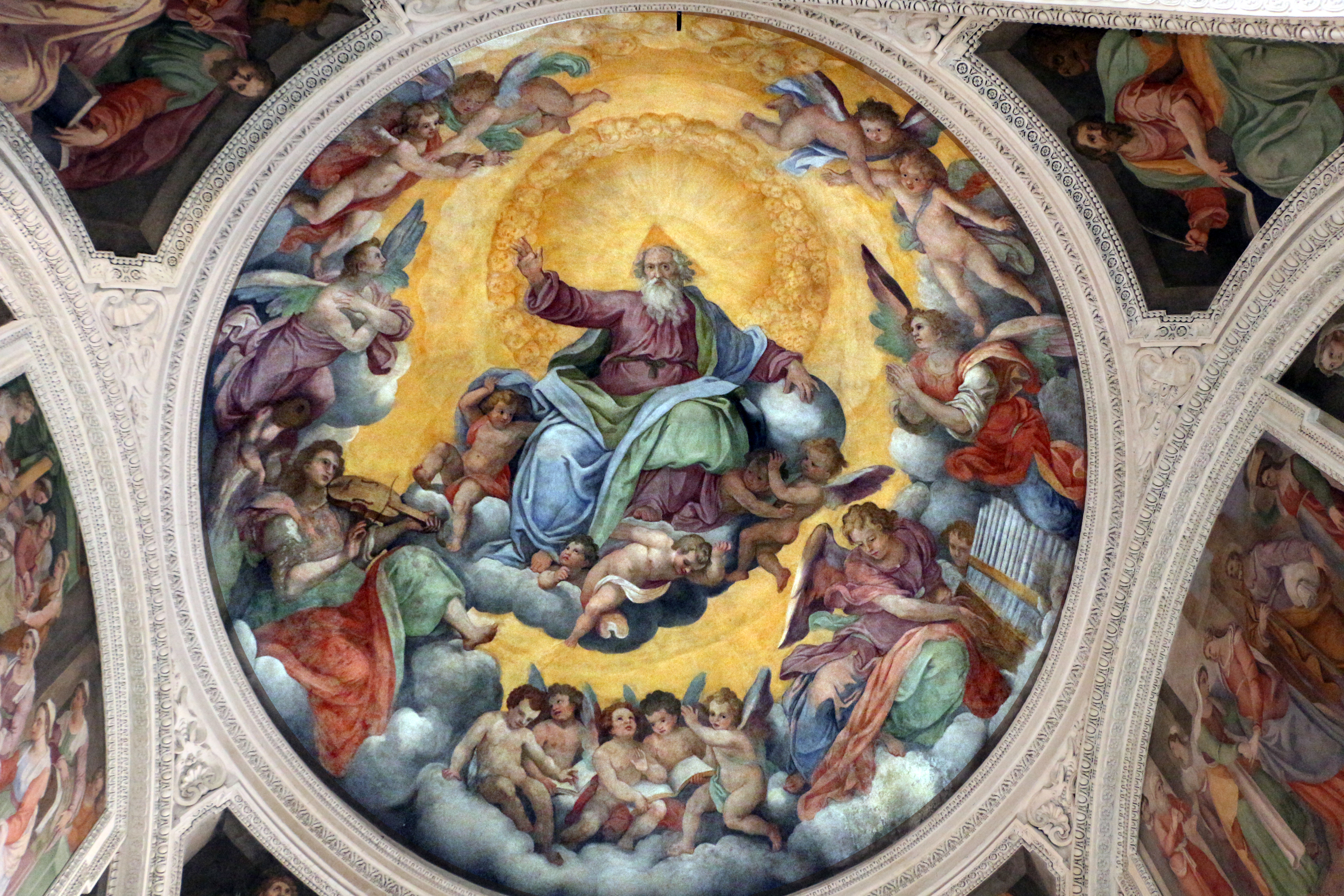
Giovanni Battista Ricci and Cristoforo Greppi, frescos in San Francesco a Ripa, Rome

Cristoforo Greppi (Active early 17th century) was an Italian painter of the Mannerist period, active in Rome.

He was born in Como, Region of Lombardy, in Italy. He worked circa 1600 with Prospero Orsi and Francesco Nappi under the guidance of Cristoforo Roncalli in the decoration of the Palazzo Mattei, Rome. Greppi painted the fresco of Joseph's brothers in Egypt. In 1605–1608, he worked with the same team on decoration for the Vatican palaces. Greppi also worked with Giovanni Battista Ricci in the decoration of the Castellani chapel in San Francesco a Ripa, Rome. He also worked on painting the vault of the Albertoni Chapel in the same church.
