= Bernardo Buontalenti =

Italian painter (c. 1531–1608)

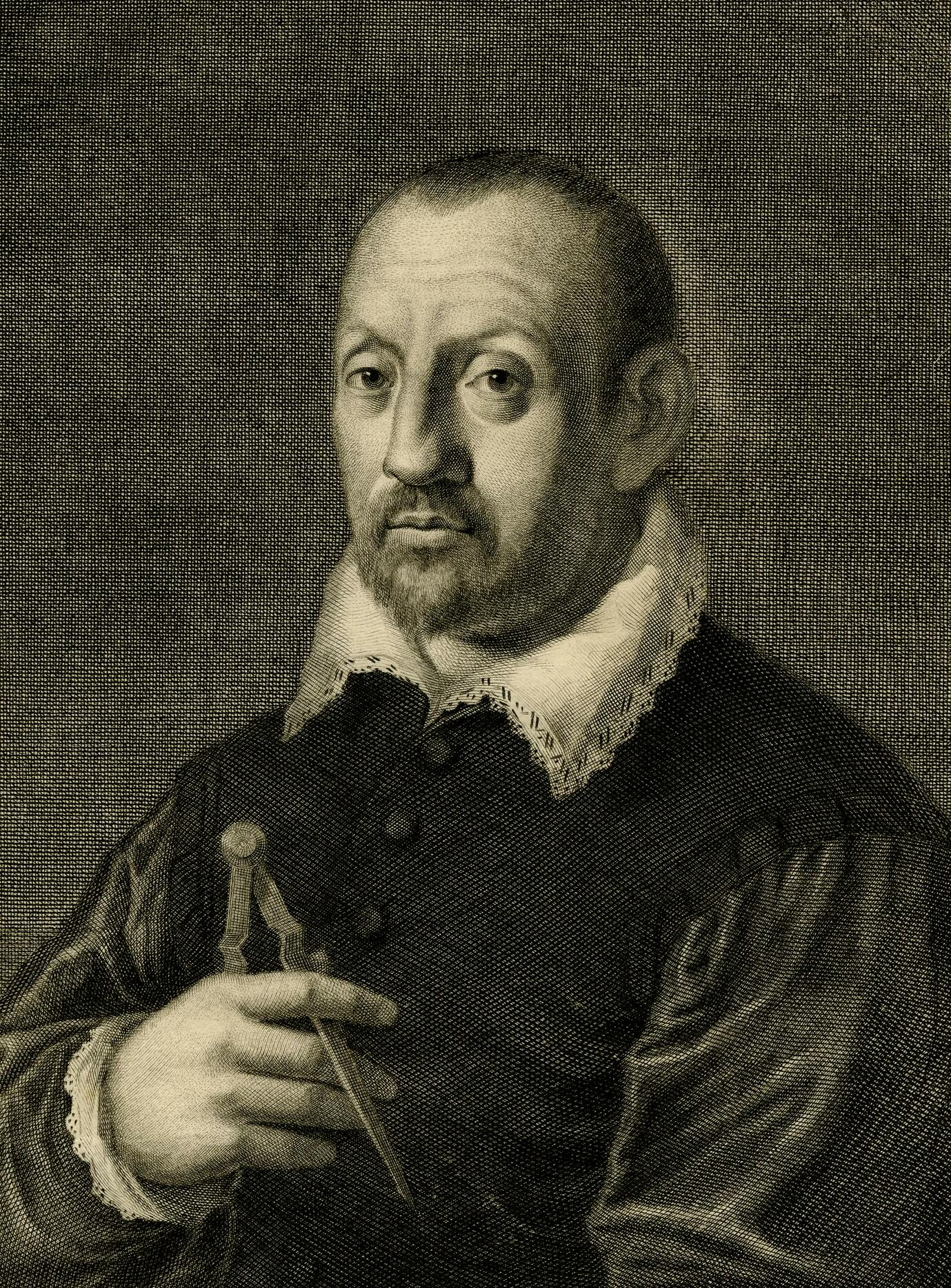
- Born: Bernardo Timante Buonacorsi c. 1531; Florence, Republic of Florence
- Died: June 1608 (aged 76–77)
- Other name: Bernardo delle Girandole
- Occupations: Stage and theatrical designer; Architect; Military engineer; Artist
- Known for: Inventor of Italian ice cream
- Notable work: Palazzo di Bianca Cappello; Boboli Gardens; Villa di Pratolino

Bernardo Timante Buonacorsi (c. 1531 – June 1608), known as Bernardo Buontalenti (Italian pronunciation: [berˈnardo ˌbwɔntaˈlɛnti]) and sometimes by the nickname "Bernardo delle Girandole", was an Italian stage designer, architect, theatrical designer, military engineer and artist.

== Biography ==
Buontalenti was born in Florence c. 1531. He entered the service of the Medici as a youth and remained with them the rest of his life. He is said to have been instructed in painting by Salviati and Bronzino, in sculpture by Michelangelo, in architecture by Giorgio Vasari, and in miniature painting under Giulio Clovio. He executed a number of miniatures for Francesco, the son of Cosimo I. More than a painter, he was celebrated as an architect; in this role he was much employed in the design of fortifications, villas, and gardens and is considered one of the most important architects of the Mannerist period. He was also a great mechanic, and an excellent mathematician. In 1562 he travelled to Spain.

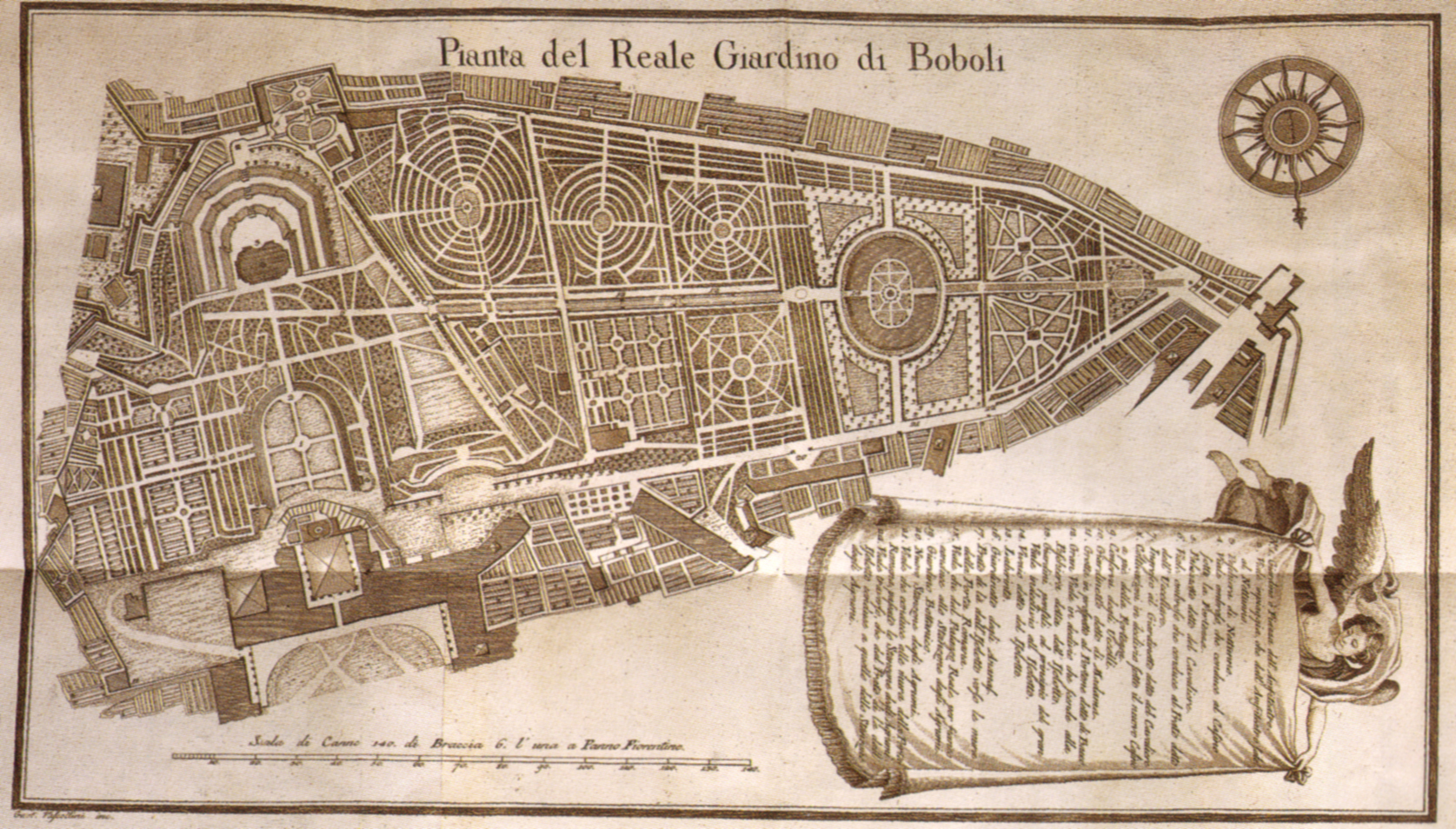
Boboli Gardens.

His first known work is from 1568, the Palazzo di Bianca Cappello in Florence. His main achievements include the project for the new city of Livorno, the decoration of Palazzo Pitti and the Boboli Gardens with the famous grotto, as well as the Parco di Pratolino of which little remains today, except for a giant sculpture by Giambologna, representing the Colossus of the Apennines. Buontalenti's skills as a military engineer are shown by the fortifications of the port of Livorno, the Forte di Belvedere in Florence, the city walls of Pistoia, Grosseto, Prato, Portoferraio (Elba) and Naples; he also perfected designs for cannons, and devised a new type of incendiary grenade.

In the Uffizi Palace of Florence, he built a great court stage, where, during the winter of 1585–1586, splendid festivities were produced under his direction. He designed costumes for the Medici extravaganzas. He was also an innovator in ice conservation and is credited with inventing the precursor to modern Florentine gelato.

Despite his successes, his prodigality led Buontalenti to financial ruin; he survived in his later life thanks to a pension given him by the Grand Duke of Tuscany.

== Work ==
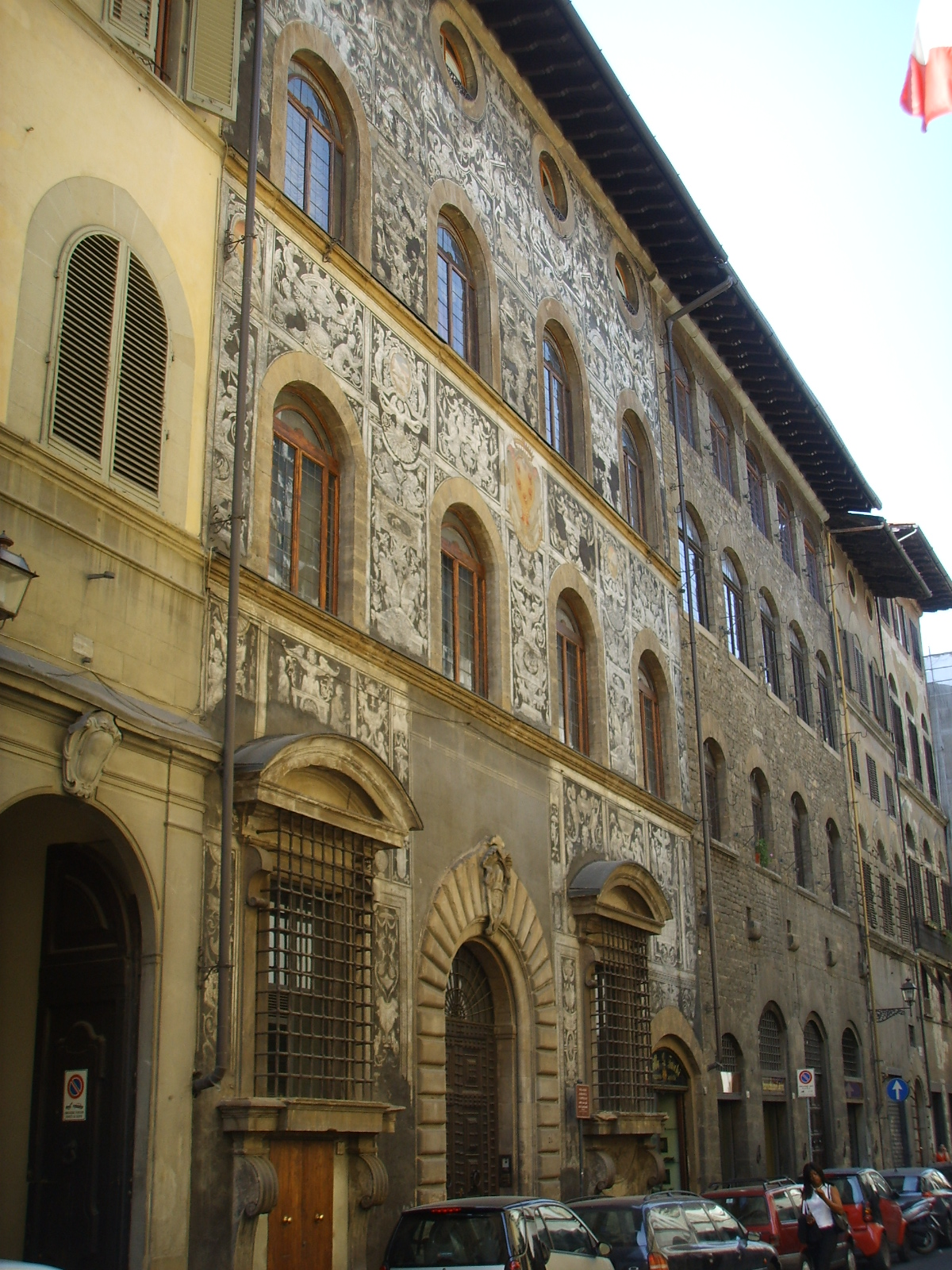
Buontalenti's Palazzo di Bianca Cappello in Florence.

One of the theaters that Bernardo had built was the Theater of Baldracca (or the Theater of the Dogana). It was opened in 1576, when Bernardo was the Court Architect, and it became one of the oldest theaters in Florence. This theater, however is not like other modern theaters. In the Theater of Baldracca the stage would be raised a little, and the audience had to stand or to sit on long benches to watch the live performance. The theater also included a box with grating, that would seat very high-ranking viewers. The grating allowed the viewers to see but not to be seen. However, the theater was not very popular and was replaced by the Uffizi Gallery Library.

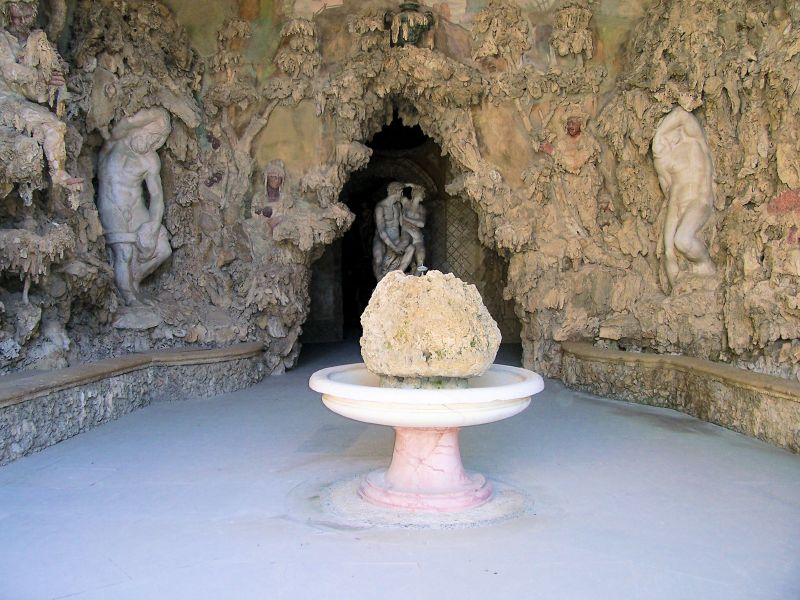
The famous Mannerist Buontalenti Grotto in the Boboli Gardens.

Another theater built by Bernardo was the Medici Theater, built for the Grand Duke Francesco I Medici. Bernardo worked at the theater between 1576 and 1586. Bernardo had employed a Mannerist and experimental architectural language for this theater, but in 1589 Bernardo had to modify the decorations to represent the authority of the Grand Duke Ferdinando I. The room structure was inspired by theaters of classical antiquity. Bernardo also included a sloped floor that allowed the audience to see better. However, when the court moved to another location, the room was left behind. Bountalenti and his pupil Matteo Nigetti were commissioned to build the Palazzo Nonfinito in 1592, but only the first floor was completed.

Buontalenti was involved in other Baroque theaters before his death. He also helped design stage machinery for specific performances, as well as many allegorical costumes for the Medici Theater. Finally, he was responsible for arranging spectacular fireworks displays for some of the performances.
