= Villa Feri =

Coordinates: 43°44′44.09″N 11°13′59.52″E

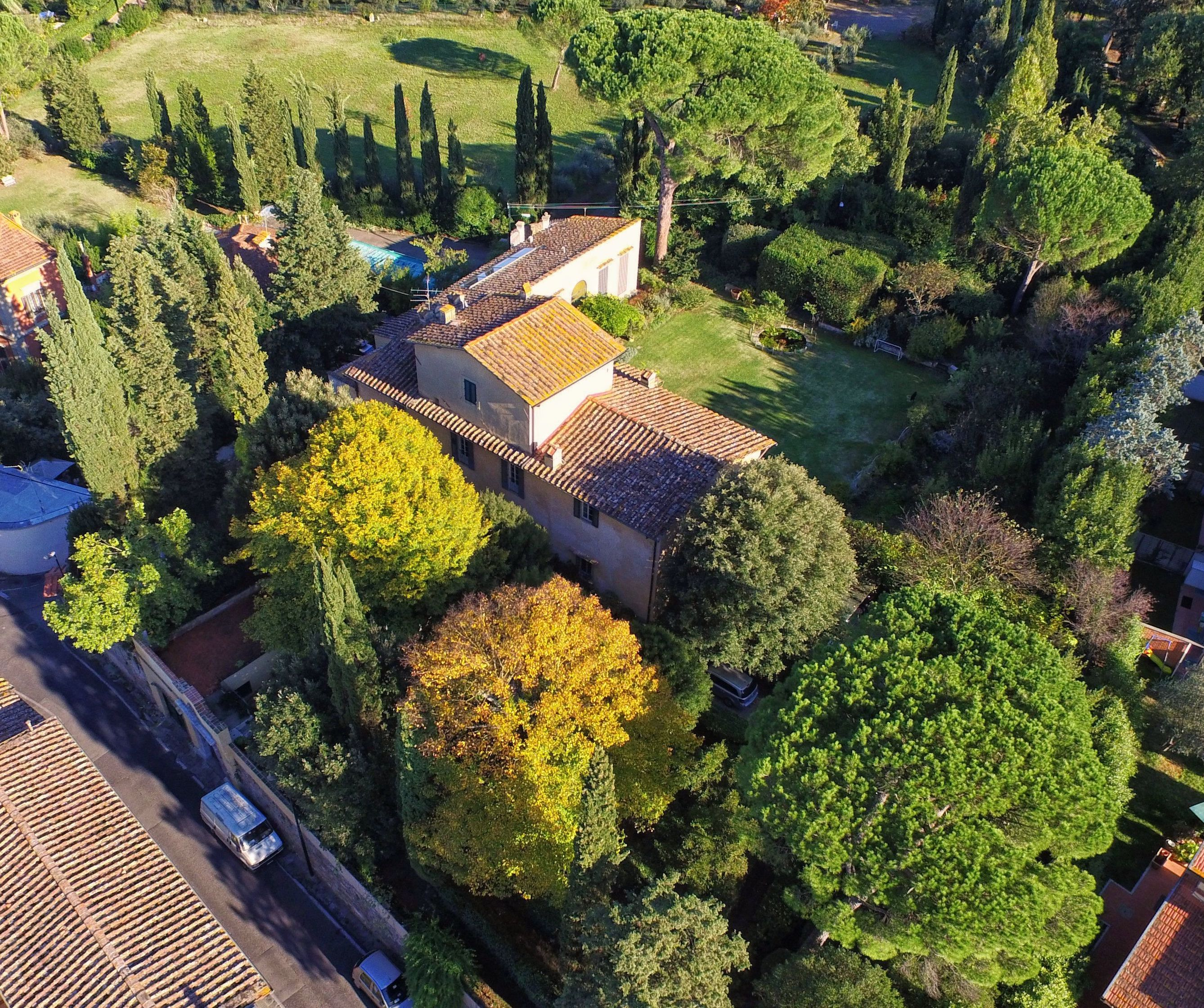
Villa Malavolta (Villa Feri) from above

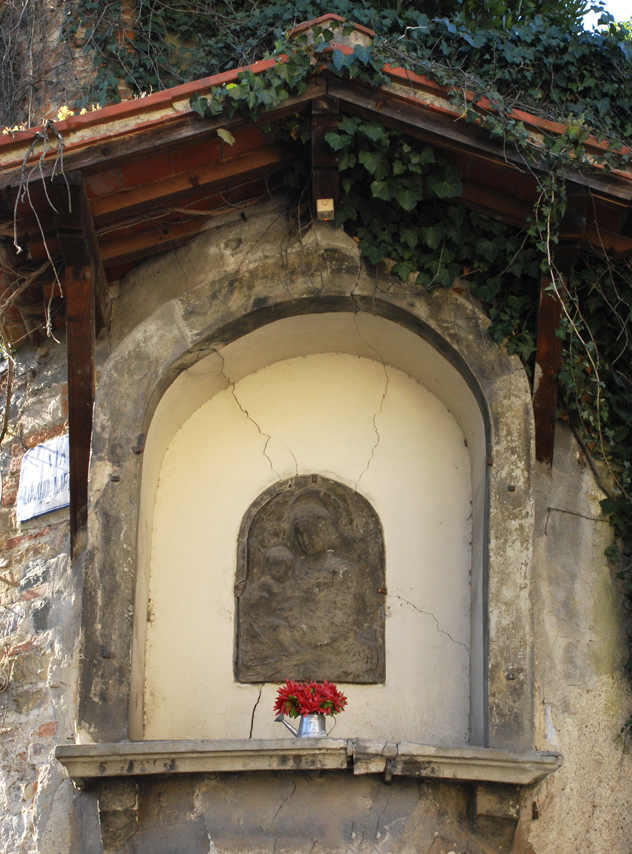
Villa Feri - Tabernacle

Villa Feri is a villa in Florence, central Italy. It is known as "gentleman's villa" (villa da signore) already in the 15th century.

The first known documents about this villa date back to 1472, when Agostino di Lotto Tanini and Agnolo di Zanobi Da Diacceto sold it to Bernardo d'Antonio degli Alberti. In 1481 it became property of the brothers Agnolo and Benedetto Bartolomei, then, at the beginning of the 16th century, was acquired by Raffaello and Miniato Miniati. It was then property of Bartolini Salimbeni, who modified the structure of the main building, of the Vinci family and, later, of the Boni family. In 1863 it was finally acquired by the Feri family, which eventually gave the current denomination (the Feri family coat of arms is still visible on top of the main gate).

The building lies on higher grounds than the road delimiting its walls and it is symmetric in structure to the main door on Via del Podestà. The villa has two floors with a large tower-like room on top of 19th century making.

On the front there is an Italian garden from the late 19th century with hedges of laurel, limes, cypress, platanus, and a water-well. On the rear is a large garden with a centennial pine tree, while the northern side is occupied by a large limonaia delimiting Via Martellini.

On the external wall of the villa is a terracotta tabernacle with a Madonna with Child.

The Feri family sold the villa to the current owners at the end of the 1980s. Since then it is also known as Villa Malavolta.

== See also ==
- Palazzo Bartolini Salimbeni

== Sources ==
- Carocci, Guido (1892). Il Comune del Galluzzo. Florence. pp. 66–67.
- Guido Carocci, I dintorni di Firenze, Florence, 1906–1907, Volume II, pag. 293.
- Giulio Lensi Orlandi, Le ville di Firenze, Florence, Vallecchi Editore, 1965, 2nd edition, Vol. II, page. 112
- Piero Bargellini (a cura di), Le strade di Firenze, Florence, Bonechi Editore, 1977, Volume 54, pag. 138.
- Luigi Zangheri, Ville della provincia di Firenze: la città, Milan, Rusconi Editore, 1989, pag. 360.
- Bettino Gerini, Il quartiere 3, Florence, Edizioni Aster Italia, 2005, pag. 331.
