= Rinaldo Barbetti =

Italian sculptor

- Born: 29 March 1830; Siena Italy
- Died: 1904 (aged 73–74); Florence, Italy
- Known for: Woodwork
- Notable work: Italian lira design
- Father: Angelo Barbetti
- Patrons: Rothschild family, Anatoly Demidov

Rinaldo Barbetti (29 March 1830 c. 1904) was an Italian sculptor, designer and illustrator. He created designs with different art mediums such as leather, gold and wood.

== Early life ==
Barbetti was born 29 March 1830 in Siena, Italy. When he was ten years old he was working as a goldsmith. In 1841 the Barbetti family moved to Florence and he worked with his father who was a successful wood carver. His father Angelo Barbetti ran one of the most successful Wood carving shops doing work for wealthy Europeans, including Anatoly Demidov and the Rothschild family. The Barbetti's also exhibited their work in competitions and won two medals at the 1851 Great Exhibition in London: for furniture and sculpture.

At night he Rinaldo Barbetti worked as an apprenticed under designer Ulysses Owens carving picture frames.

== Career ==
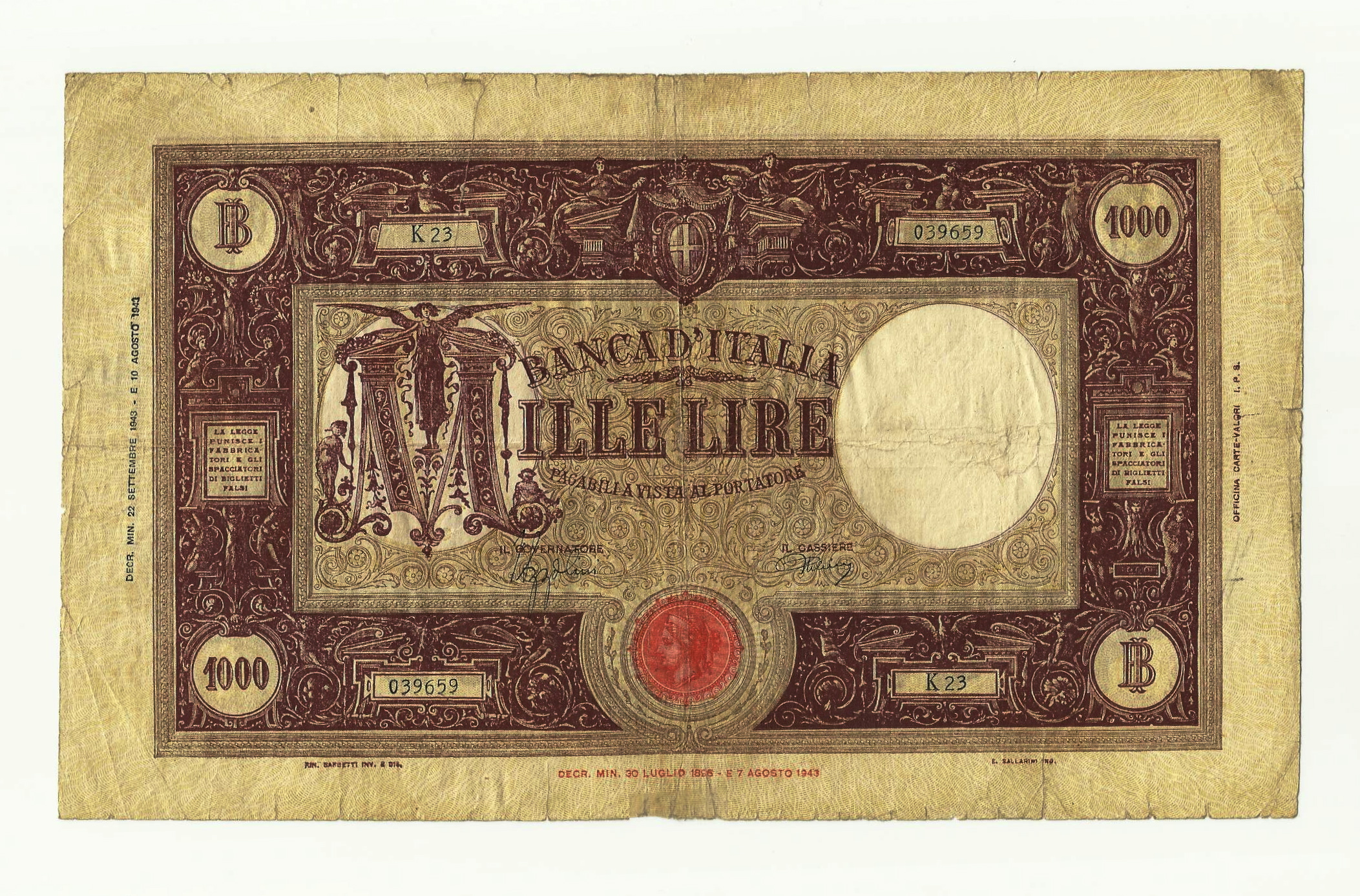
Barbetti designed 1'000 Lire Italiane del 1943

Barbetti was considered one of the leading artists in Florence, Italy. He was called on to produce artwork throughout Florence. He worked with stamped leather in the Villa Paolina. He was also an expert engraver and was known for the precision of his work. He did work on the facade of the Florentine Duomo. In Florence, 1900 he was commissioned by Desiderio Chilovi, to create an urn for the poet Dante's ashes, or what was referred to as "Dante's dust". Barbetti designed the urn but it is not known if he ever created it. The urn has never been found and there are no pictures of it.

His design was also used on the Italian lira currency for the 1943 banknote known as the Grande M or Mille Lire.

In 1876 Barbetti renovated the giant Apennine Colossus statue.

The woodwork in the library of Les Ambassadeurs Club was completed in the Florentine studios of Rinaldo Barbetti.
