= Giovanni Guerra =

Italian painter

Giovanni Guerra (1544–1618) was an Italian draughtsman and painter from Modena who worked in Rome. He probably arrived in the city as early as 1562, though he was not documented until 1583, when he frescoed three friezes of allegorical figures in the Palazzetto Cenci, a modest project for a patron who was not very prestigious.

For Cardinal Montalto he dedicated an elaborate composition of the Mystic Terrestrial Paradise (paradiso terrestre mistico), which he had engraved with verses composed for the occasion; decorations from the Sala Grande of the Palazzo alle Terme of the Villa Montalto are also attributed to Guerra: on 24 April 1585 the Cardinal was elected to the papacy as Sixtus V. In 1586 Guerra received the important commission, the first project of Sixtus, to fresco the staircase that connects the Sistine Chapel in the Vatican Palace with St. Peter's Basilica. In this large undertaking he was associated from the start of the following year with the experienced Cesare Nebbia, and the partners continued to control the expanding team of painters in the vast decorations for Sixtus V, notably in the Salone Sistino of the Vatican Library (completed in 1589), where they provided designs and supervision for a multitude of assistants, in a project that Sydney J. Freedberg dismisses as "prosy humanistic subject matter in a flat academic style". Guerra did less painting as the project unrolled, concentrating on providing the other artists with designs, his strong point, for his coloring was weak, according to his first biographer, F. Forciroli. He developed a reputation as an inventor of designs, such as the series of drawings demonstrating the story of Judith, now in the Avery Library, Columbia University, which another hand has referred to this pittore erudito

Guerra provided drawings for Cesare Ripa's Iconologia (1593) and further drawings for its second, expanded Roman edition (1603), which remained in active use by painters and designers for the decorative arts for more than a century. His own little volume of engraved emblems, Varii Emblemi hierogliphici, he signed as Pittore e Invent. More than three hundred drawings by him are conserved in the Musée du Louvre and the École nationale supérieure des Beaux-Arts, Paris.
