= Anna de' Medici =

Anna de' Medici may refer to:

- Anna de' Medici (1569–1584), daughter of Grand Duke Francesco I de' Medici
- Anna de' Medici, Archduchess of Austria (1616–1676), daughter of Grand-duke Cosimo II de' Medici
- Anna Maria Luisa de' Medici (1667–1743), daughter of Grand-duke Cosimo III de' Medici
- Anna de' Medici (1553–1553), daughter of Grand-duke Cosimo I de' Medici
