= Philip de' Medici =

Italian noble (1577–1582)

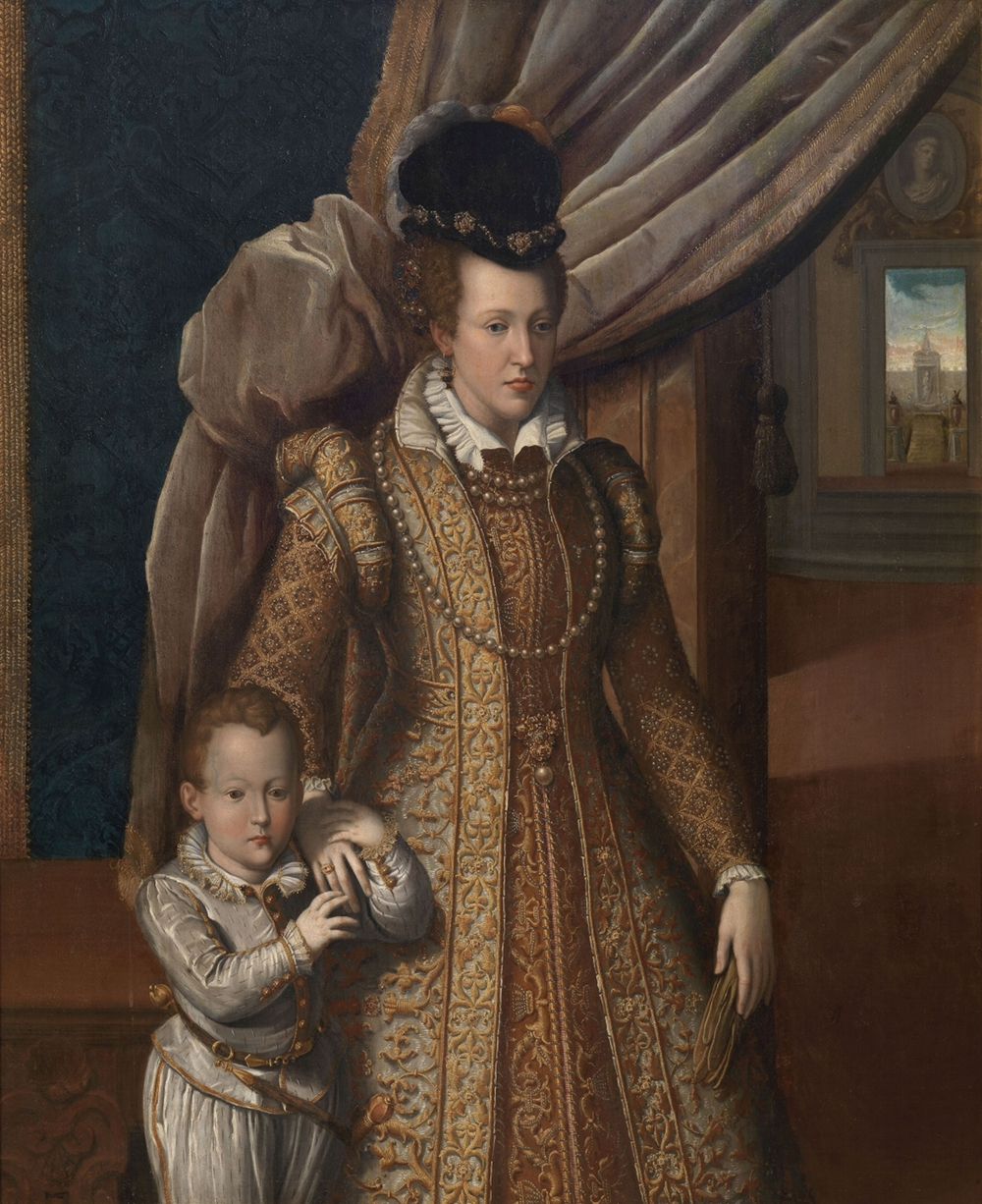
Philip and his mother

Philip de' Medici (20 May 1577 – 29 March 1582) was the youngest child of Francesco I de' Medici and Joanna of Austria. He was the heir to the Tuscan throne.

== Life ==
Philip received his name in honour of the King Philip II of Spain. The birth was celebrated with great joy by all the court, because thus was secured the succession of the Grand Duchy for another generation and eliminated all the hopes of Bianca Cappello (his father's mistress) to have her son Antonio become heir of Tuscany. Philip became Grand Prince of Tuscany.

When he was not quite eleven months old, his mother died in an accident falling down the stairs of the ducal apartments while heavily pregnant. His father then married Bianca Cappello. Philip was one of seven children, but only two of the children survived till adulthood, Eleonora de' Medici and Marie de' Medici (who became queen consort of France). He had another sister Anna who died aged fourteen. Philip died on 29 March 1582; he was four years old, and suffered from hydrocephalus: when his skull was opened, the equivalent of about a glass of fluid came out. Recent study of his remains have confirmed the diagnosis.

== Ancestry ==
Ancestors of Philip de' Medici

8. Giovanni dalle Bande Nere
4. Cosimo I de' Medici
9. Maria Salviati
2. Francesco I de' Medici
10. Pedro Álvarez de Toledo
5. Eleonora of Toledo
11. Maria Osorio
1. Philip de' Medici
12. Philip I of Castile
6. Ferdinand I, Holy Roman Emperor
13. Joanna of Castile
3. Joanna of Austria
14. Vladislaus II of Bohemia and Hungary
7. Anna of Bohemia and Hungary
15. Anna of Foix-Candale
