= Marie de' Medici =

Queen of France from 1600 to 1610

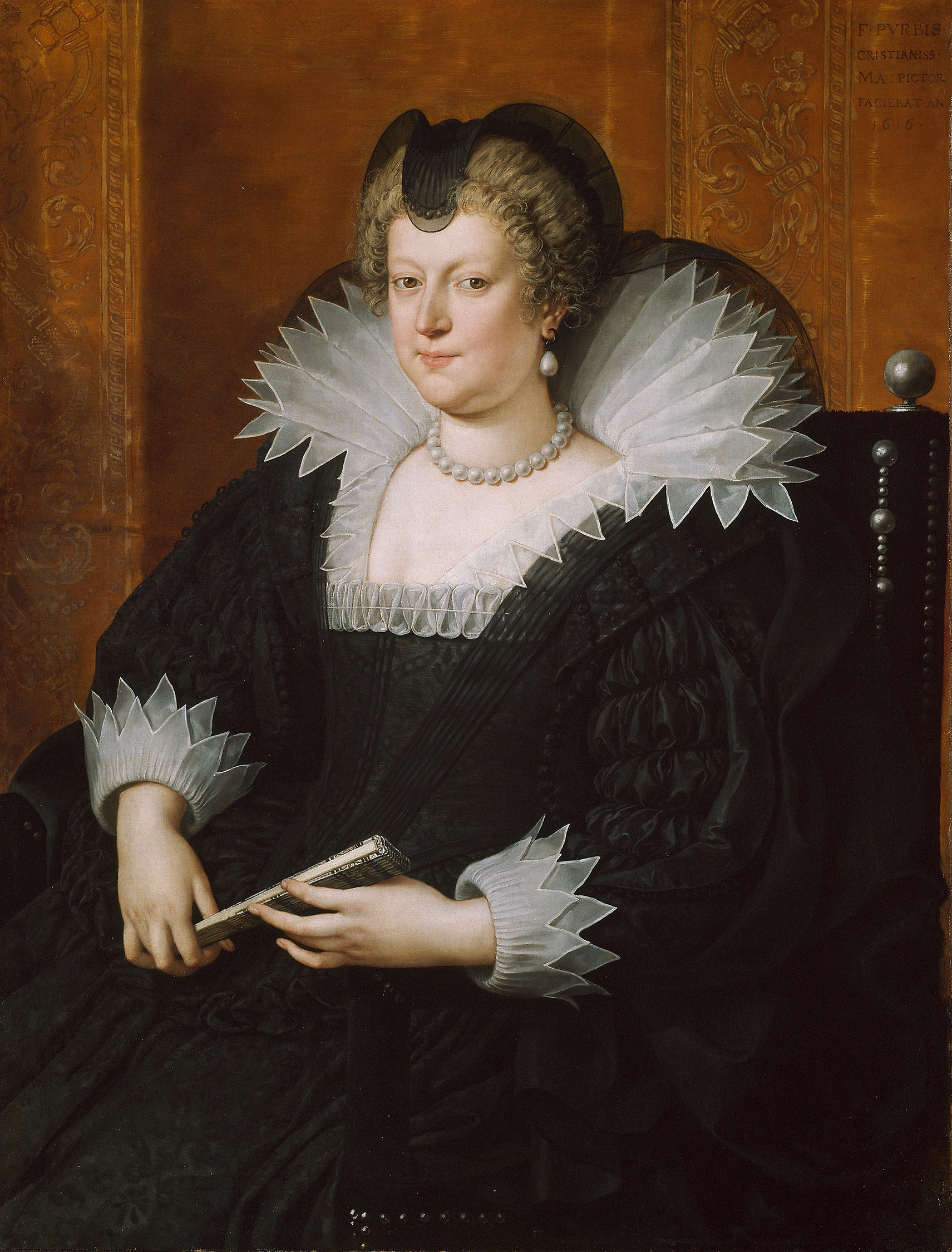

Queen consort of France and Navarre
- Tenure: 17 December 1600 – 14 May 1610
- Coronation: 13 May 1610

Queen regent of France and Navarre
- Regency: 14 May 1610 – 24 April 1617
- Monarch: Louis XIII
- Born: 26 April 1575; Palazzo Pitti, Florence, Tuscany
- Died: 3 July 1642 (aged 67); Sternengasse 10, Cologne
- Burial: 8 March 1643; Basilica of St Denis, Paris, France
- Spouse: Henry IV of France (m. 1600; died 1610)
- Issue: Louis XIII, King of France; Elisabeth, Queen of Spain and Portugal; Christine, Duchess of Savoy; Nicolas, Duke of Orléans; Gaston, Duke of Orléans; Henrietta Maria, Queen of England, Scotland, and Ireland
- House: Medici
- Father: Francesco I, Grand Duke of Tuscany
- Mother: Joanna of Austria
- Religion: Catholicism

Marie de' Medici (French: Marie de Médicis; Italian: Maria de' Medici; 26 April 1575 – 3 July 1642) was Queen of France and Navarre as the second wife of King Henry IV. After Henry's assassination in 1610, Marie became Queen Regent of France for her young son, Louis XIII, giving her significant political influence. She served in the role between 1610 and 1617, during the minority of the boy king. Her mandate as regent legally expired in 1614, when Louis reached the age of majority, but, she refused to resign and continued as regent until she was removed by a coup in 1617.

Marie was a member of the powerful House of Medici in the branch of the grand dukes of Tuscany. Her family's wealth inspired Henry IV to choose Marie as his second wife after his divorce from his previous wife, Margaret of Valois. The assassination of her husband in 1610, which occurred the day after her coronation, caused her to act as regent for her son, Louis XIII, until 1614, when he officially attained his legal majority, but as the head of the Conseil du Roi, she retained the power.

Noted for her ceaseless political intrigues at the French court, her extensive artistic patronage and her favourites (the most famous being Concino Concini and Leonora Dori), she ended up being banished from the country by her son and dying in the city of Cologne, in the Holy Roman Empire.

== Life ==
=== Early years ===
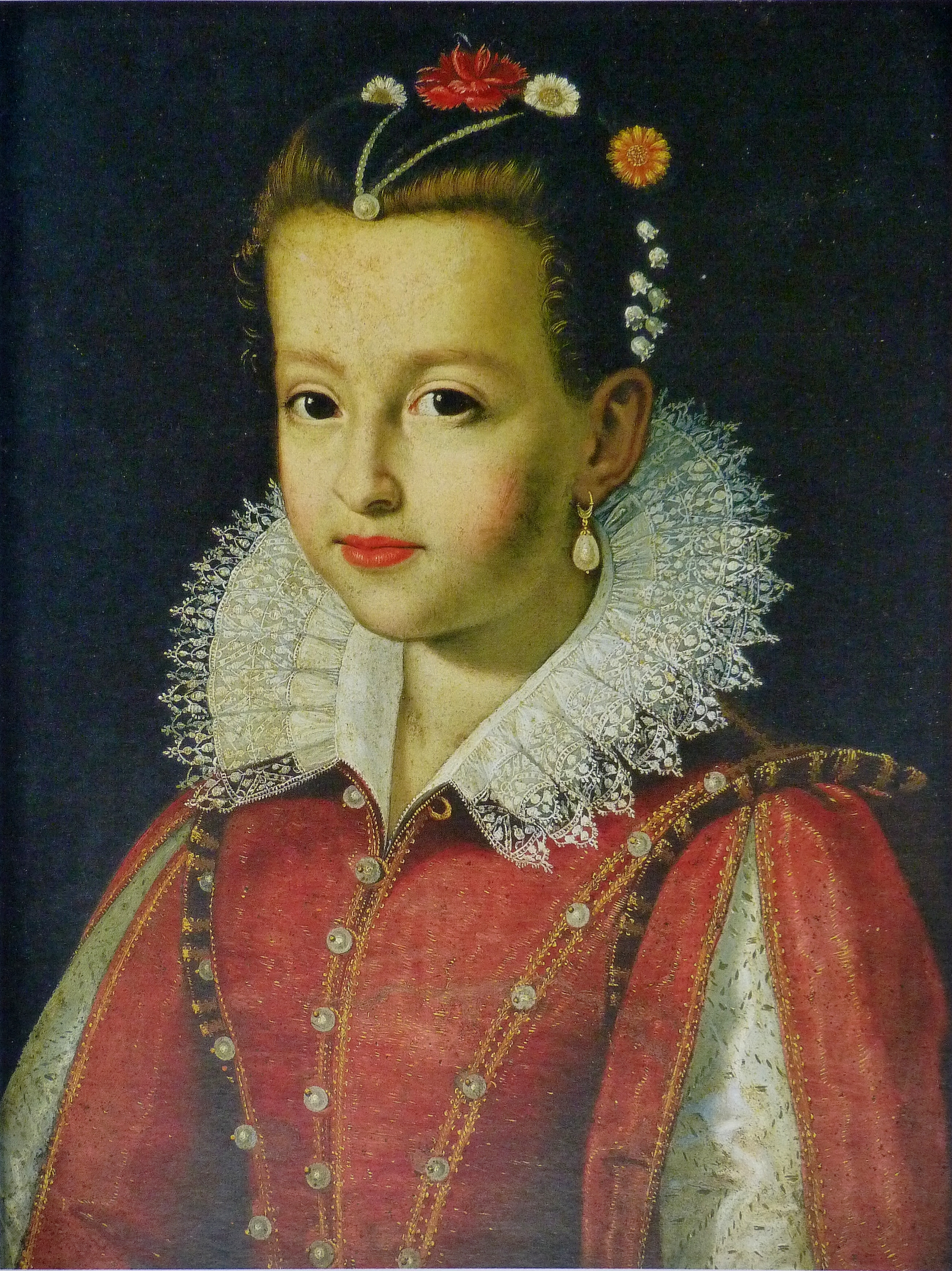
Maria de' Medici as a child.

Born at the Palazzo Pitti of Florence, Italy on 26 April 1575, Maria was the sixth daughter of Francesco I de' Medici, Grand Duke of Tuscany, and Archduchess Joanna of Austria. She was a descendant of Lorenzo the Elder –a branch of the Medici family sometimes referred to as the 'cadet' branch– and was also a Habsburg through her mother, who was a direct descendant of Joanna of Castile and Philip I of Castile.

Of her five elder sisters, only the eldest, Eleonora and the third, Anna survived infancy. Their only brother Philip de' Medici, was born on 20 May 1577. In 1578, Grand Duchess Joanna was heavily pregnant with her eighth child when she fell from the stairs in the Grand Ducal Palace in Florence, dying the next day after giving birth to a premature stillborn son. A few months later, Grand Duke Francesco I married his longtime mistress Bianca Cappello; the marriage was officially revealed one year later, on 12 June 1579. In a few years, Maria also lost two of her siblings, Philip (died 29 March 1582 aged 4) and Anna (died 19 February 1584 aged 14).

Maria and her only surviving sister, Eleonora (with whom she had a close relationship) spent their childhood at the Palazzo Pitti in Florence, placed under the care of a governess along with their paternal first cousin Virginio Orsini (son of Isabella de' Medici, Duchess of Bracciano).

After her sister's marriage in 1584 with Vincenzo Gonzaga, heir of the Duchy of Mantua, and her departure to her husband's homeland, Maria's only playmate was her first cousin Virginio Orsini, to whom she deferred all her affection. In addition, her stepmother brought a female companion to the Palazzo Pitti for Maria, a young girl named Dianora Dori, who would be renamed Leonora. This young girl, a few years older than Maria, soon gained great influence over the princess, to the point that Maria would not make decisions without talking to Leonora first.

On the 19th and 20 October, in 1587, at the Villa Medici in Poggio a Caiano, Grand Duke Francesco I and Bianca Cappello died. They may have been poisoned, but some historians believe they were killed by malarial fever. Now orphaned, Maria was considered the richest heiress in Europe.

Maria's uncle Ferdinando I de' Medici became the new Grand Duke of Tuscany and married Christina of Lorraine (granddaughter of the famous Catherine de' Medici, Queen of France) in 1589. Notwithstanding his desire to give an heir to his dynasty, the new Grand Duke gave his orphaned nephew and niece a good education. Maria was interested in science; she enjoyed learning about mathematics, philosophy, astronomy, as well as the arts. She was also passionate about jewelry and precious stones. Very devout, she was known to keep an open mind, and to depend on those around her for support.

Close to the artists of her native Florence, Maria was trained in drawing by Jacopo Ligozzi, and she was reportedly very talented; she also played music (singing and practicing the guitar and the lute) and enjoyed theater, dance, and comedy.

The wealth of the Medici family attracted many suitors, in particular the younger brother of her aunt Grand Duchess Christina, François, Count of Vaudémont and heir of the Duchy of Lorraine. But soon, a more prestigious suitor presented himself: King Henry IV of France.

=== Queen of France ===
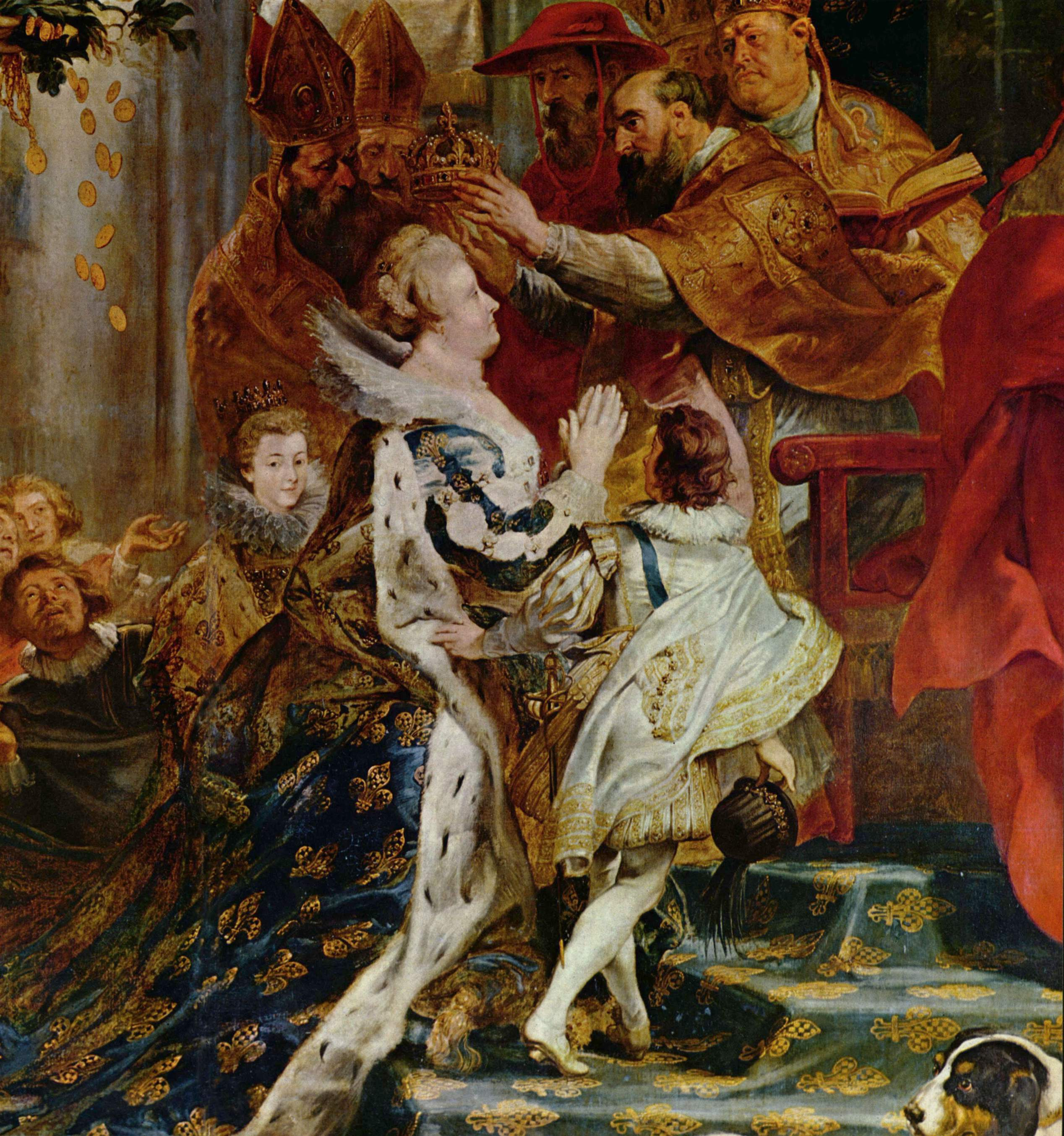
Coronation of Marie de' Medici in St. Denis (detail), by Peter Paul Rubens, 1622–1625

The marriage of Henry IV with Maria de' Medici represented above all, for France, a solution to dynastic and financial concerns: it was said that the French king "owed the bride's father, Francesco de' Medici, Grand Duke of Tuscany, who had helped support his war effort, a whopping 1,174,000 écus and this was the only means Henry could find to pay back the debt..." In addition, the Medici family—banking creditors of the Kings of France—promised a dowry of 600,000 écus d'or (2 million livres including 1 million paid in cash to cancel the debt contracted by France with the Medici bank), which earned the future Queen the nickname "the big banker" (la grosse banquière) from her jealous rival, Catherine Henriette de Balzac d'Entragues, Henry IV's current maîtresse-en-titre. Moreover, Maria de' Medici was the granddaughter of Ferdinand I, Holy Roman Emperor (in office: 1556–1564), thereby ensuring and reinforcing a legitimate royal descent for prospective future members of the House of Bourbon (the Catholic League and Habsburg Spain had questioned Bourbon legitimacy during the previous French Succession War of 1589 - c. 1593).

After having obtained the annulment of his union to Margaret of Valois in December 1599, Henry IV officially started negotiations for his new marriage with Maria de' Medici. The marriage contract was signed in Paris in March 1600 and official ceremonies took place in Tuscany and France from October to December of the same year: the marriage by proxy took place at the Cathedral of Santa Maria del Fiore (now Florence Cathedral) on 5 October 1600 with Henry IV's favorite the Duc de Bellegarde representing the French sovereign. The celebrations were attended by 4,000 guests with lavish entertainment, including examples of the newly invented musical genre of opera, such as Jacopo Peri's Euridice. Maria (now known by the French usage of her name, Marie de Médicis) left Florence for Livorno on 23 October, accompanied by 2,000 people who made up her suite, and set off for Marseille, which she reached on 3 November. Antoinette de Pons, Marquise de Guercheville and Première dame d'honneur of the new Queen, was responsible for welcoming her to Marseille. After her disembarkation, Marie continued her trip, arriving at Lyon on 3 December. She and Henry IV finally met on 9 December and spent their wedding night together. On 17 December, the Papal legate finally arrived, and gave his blessing to the religious wedding ceremony at the Cathedral of Saint-Jean-Baptiste de Lyon.

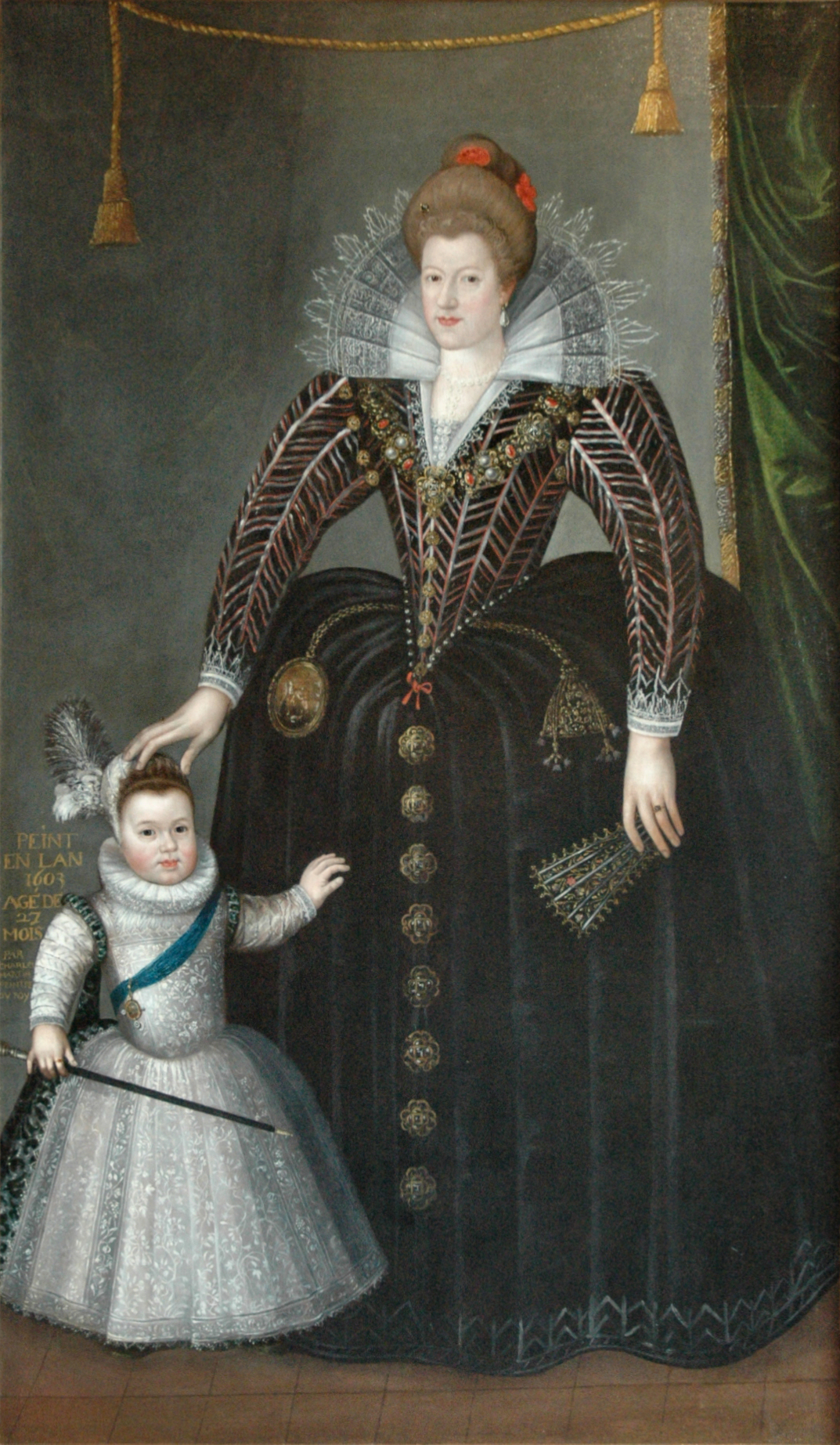
Marie de Médicis and her son the Dauphin (future Louis XIII), c. 1603.

Marie gave birth to her first child, a son, on 27 September 1601 at the Palace of Fontainebleau. The boy, named Louis, and automatically upon birth heir to the throne and Dauphin of France, was born to the great satisfaction of the King and France, which had been waiting for the birth of a Dauphin for more than 40 years. Marie gave birth to five more children (three daughters and two more sons) between 1602 and 1609; however, during 1603–1606, she was effectively separated from her husband.

Although the marriage succeeded in producing children, it was not a happy one. Marie was of a very jealous temperament, and she refused to accept her husband's numerous infidelities; indeed, he forced his wife to rub shoulders with his mistresses. She mostly quarreled with the maîtresse-en-titre Catherine de Balzac d'Entragues (whom Henry IV had allegedly promised he would marry following the death in 1599 of his former maîtresse-en-titre, Gabrielle d'Estrées) in a language that shocked French courtiers; also, it was said in court that Henry IV took Marie only for breeding purposes exactly as Henry II had treated Catherine de' Medici. Although the King could have easily banished his mistress, supporting his wife, he never did so. Marie, in turn, showed great sympathy and support to her husband's banished ex-wife Marguerite de Valois, prompting Henry IV to allow her back to Paris.

Another bone of contention concerned the proper maintenance of Marie's household as Queen of France: despite the enormous dowry she brought to the marriage, her husband often refused her the money necessary to pay all the expenses that she intended to carry out to show everyone her royal rank. Household scenes took place, followed by periods of relative peace. Marie was also very keen to be officially crowned Queen of France, but Henry IV postponed the ceremony for political reasons.

Marie had to wait until 13 May 1610 to be finally crowned Queen of France. At this time, Henry IV was about to depart to fight in the War of Succession over the United Duchies of Jülich-Cleves-Berg; the coronation aimed to confer greater legitimacy on the Queen from the perspective of a possible regency which she would be called upon to provide in the absence of the King. The very next day (14 May), Henry IV was assassinated by François Ravaillac - which immediately raised suspicions of a conspiracy.

=== Regency ===
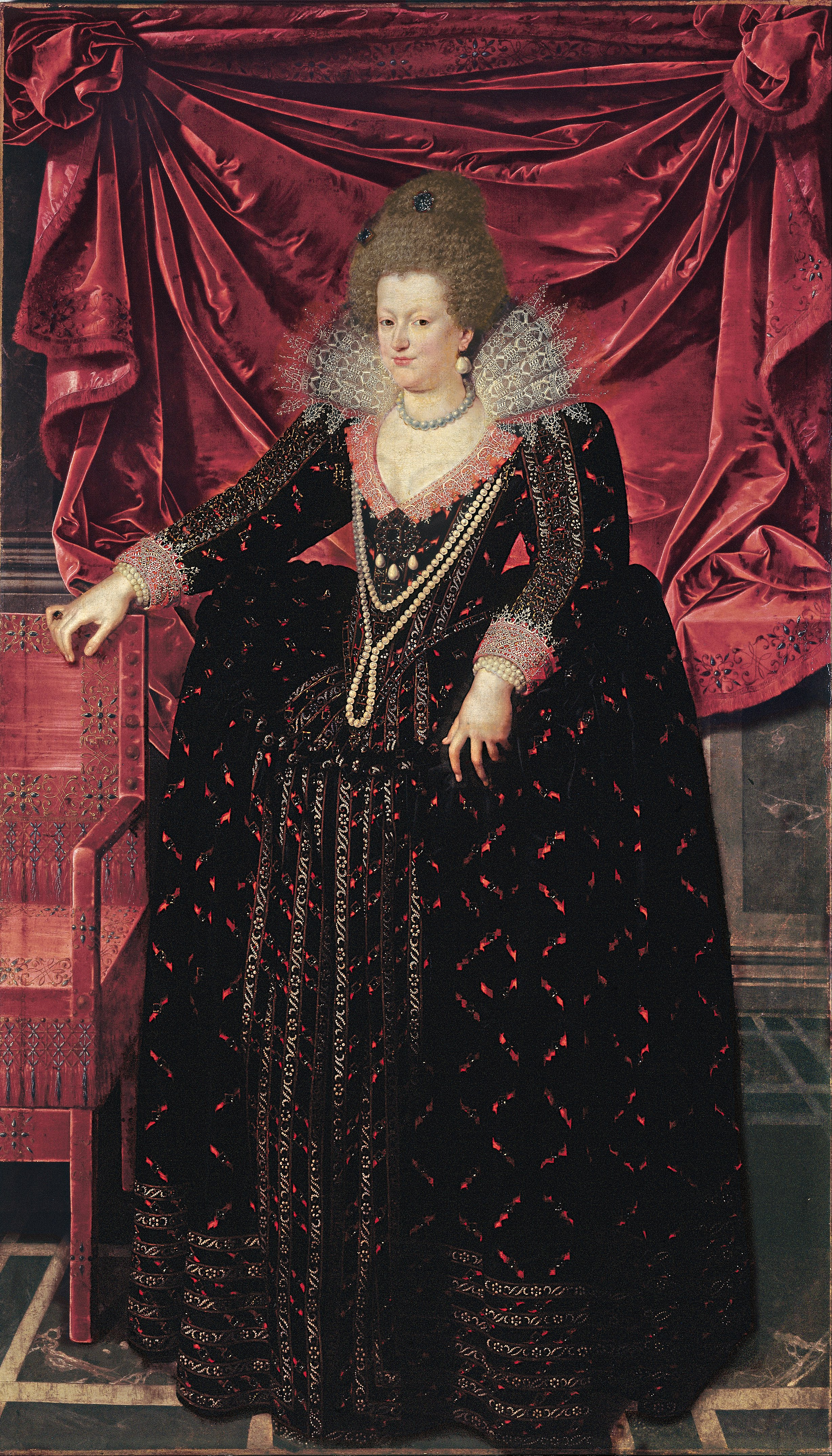
Marie de Médicis, by Frans Pourbus the Younger, c. 1606. Museo de Bellas Artes de Bilbao.

Within hours after Henry IV's assassination, Marie was confirmed as Regent by the Parliament of Paris on behalf of her son and new King, eight-year-old Louis XIII. She immediately banished her late husband's mistress, Catherine de Balzac d'Entragues, from the court. At first, she kept the closest advisers of Henry IV in the key court positions and took for herself (1611) the title of Governess of the Bastille, although she entrusted the physical custody of this important Parisian fortress to Joachim de Chateauvieux, her knight of honor, who took direct command as a lieutenant of the Queen-Regent.

From the beginning, Marie was under suspicion at court because she was perceived as a foreigner and never truly mastered French; moreover, she was heavily influenced by her Italian friends and confidants, including her foster sister Leonora "Galigai" Dori and Concino Concini, who was created Marquis d'Ancre and a Marshal of France, even though he had never fought a single battle. The Concinis had Henry IV's able minister, the Duke of Sully, dismissed, and Italian representatives of the Roman Catholic Church hoped to force the suppression of Protestantism in France by means of their influence. However, Marie maintained her late husband's policy of religious tolerance. As one of her first acts, Marie reconfirmed Henri IV's Edict of Nantes, which ordered religious tolerance for Protestants in France while asserting the supremacy of the Roman Catholic Church.

To further consolidate her authority as Regent of the Kingdom of France, Marie decided to impose the strict protocol from the court of Spain. An avid ballet performer and art collector, she deployed artistic patronage that helped develop the arts in France. Daughter of a Habsburg archduchess, the Queen-Regent abandoned the traditional anti-Habsburg French foreign policy (one of her first acts was the overturn of the Treaty of Bruzolo, an alliance signed between Henry IV's representatives and Charles Emmanuel I, Duke of Savoy), and formed an alliance with Habsburg Spain which culminated in 1615 with the double marriage of her daughter Elisabeth and her son Louis XIII with the two children of King Philip III of Spain, Philip, Prince of Asturias (future Philip IV) and Anne of Austria, respectively.

Nevertheless, the Queen-Regent's policy caused discontent. On the one hand, Protestants were worried about the rapprochement of Marie with Spain; on the other hand, Marie's attempts to strengthen her power by relying on the Concinis deeply displeased part of the French nobility. Stirring up xenophobic passion, the nobility designated the Italian immigrants favored by Marie as responsible for all the wrongs of the kingdom. Taking advantage of the clear weakness of the Regency, the princes of the blood under the leadership of Henri II, Prince of Condé, rebelled against Marie.

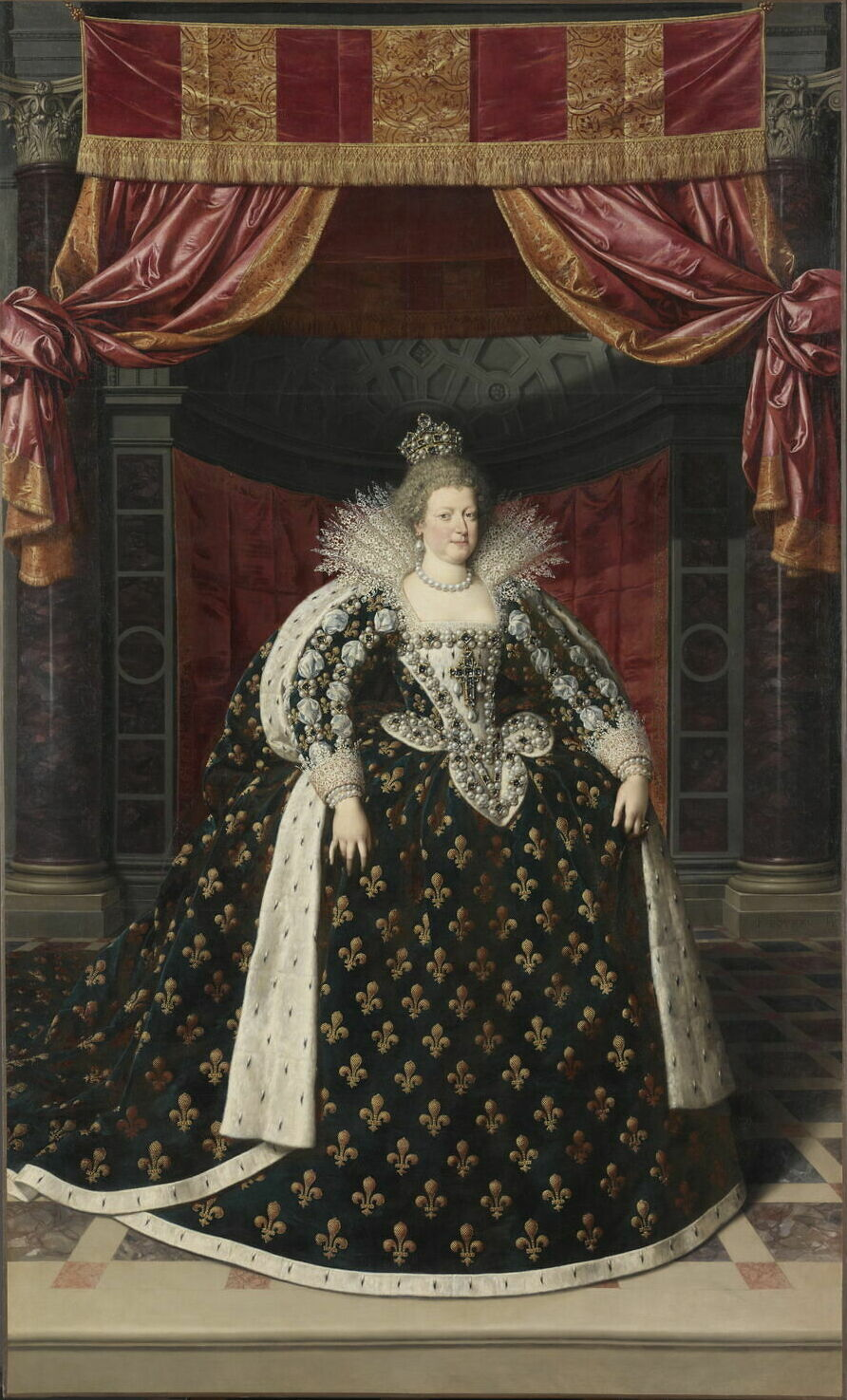
Portrait by Frans Pourbus the Younger, 1610. Louvre Museum, Paris.

In application of the Treaty of Sainte-Menehould (15 May 1614), the Queen-Regent convened the Estates General in Paris. The Prince of Condé failed to structure his opposition to royal power. However, Marie undertook to cement the alliance with Spain and to ensure respect for the theses of the Council of Trent. The reforms of the paulette and the taille remained a dead letter. The clergy played the role of arbiter between the Third Estate and the nobility who did not manage to get along: Civil lieutenant Henri de Mesmes declared that "all the Estates were brothers and children of a common mother, France", while one of the representatives of the nobility replied that he refused to be the brother of a child of a shoemaker or cobbler. This antagonism benefited the court, which soon pronounced the closure of the Estates General. The Regency was officially ended following the Lit de justice of 2 October 1614, which declared that Louis XIII had attained his legal majority of age, but Marie then became head of the Conseil du Roi and retained all her control over the government.

One year after the end of the Estates General, a new rebellion of the Prince of Condé allowed his entry into the Conseil du Roi by the Treaty of Loudun (3 May 1616), which also granted him the sum of 1,500,000 livres and the government of Guyenne. During this time, the Protestants obtained a reprieve of six years to the return of their places of safety to the royal power.

In 1616, the requirements of the Prince of Condé became so important that Marie had him arrested on 1 September and imprisoned him in the Bastille. The Duke of Nevers then took the leadership of the nobility in revolt against the Queen. Nevertheless, Marie's rule was strengthened by the appointment of Armand Jean du Plessis (later Cardinal Richelieu)—who had come to prominence at the meetings of the Estates General—as Secretary of State for Foreign Affairs on 5 November 1616.

Despite being legally an adult for more than two years, Louis XIII had little power in the government; finally, he asserted his authority the next year. Feeling humiliated by the conduct of his mother, who monopolized power, the King organized (with the help of his favorite the Duc de Luynes) a coup d'état (also named Coup de majesté) on 24 April 1617: Concino Concini was assassinated by the Marquis de Vitry, and Marie exiled to the Château de Blois.

=== Revolt of 1619 and return from exile ===
In the night of 21–22 February 1619, the 43-year-old Queen Mother escaped from her prison in Blois with a rope ladder and by scaling a wall of 40 m. Gentlemen took her across the Pont de Blois and riders sent by the Duc d'Épernon escorted Marie in his coach. She took refuge in the Château d'Angoulême and provoked an uprising against her son the King, the so-called "war of mother and son" (guerre de la mère et du fils).

A first treaty, the Treaty of Angoulême, negotiated by Richelieu, calmed the conflict. However, the Queen Mother was not satisfied and relaunched the war by rallying the great nobles of the Kingdom to her cause ("second war of mother and son"). The noble coalition was quickly defeated at the Battle of Ponts-de-Cé (7 August 1620) by Louis XIII, who forgave his mother and the princes.

Aware that he could not avoid the formation of plots as long as his mother remained in exile, the King accepted her return to court. She then returned to Paris, where she worked on the construction of her Luxembourg Palace. After the death of the Duc de Luynes in December 1621, she gradually made her political comeback. Richelieu played an important role in her reconciliation with the king and even managed to bring the queen mother back to the Conseil du Roi.

=== Artistic patronage ===
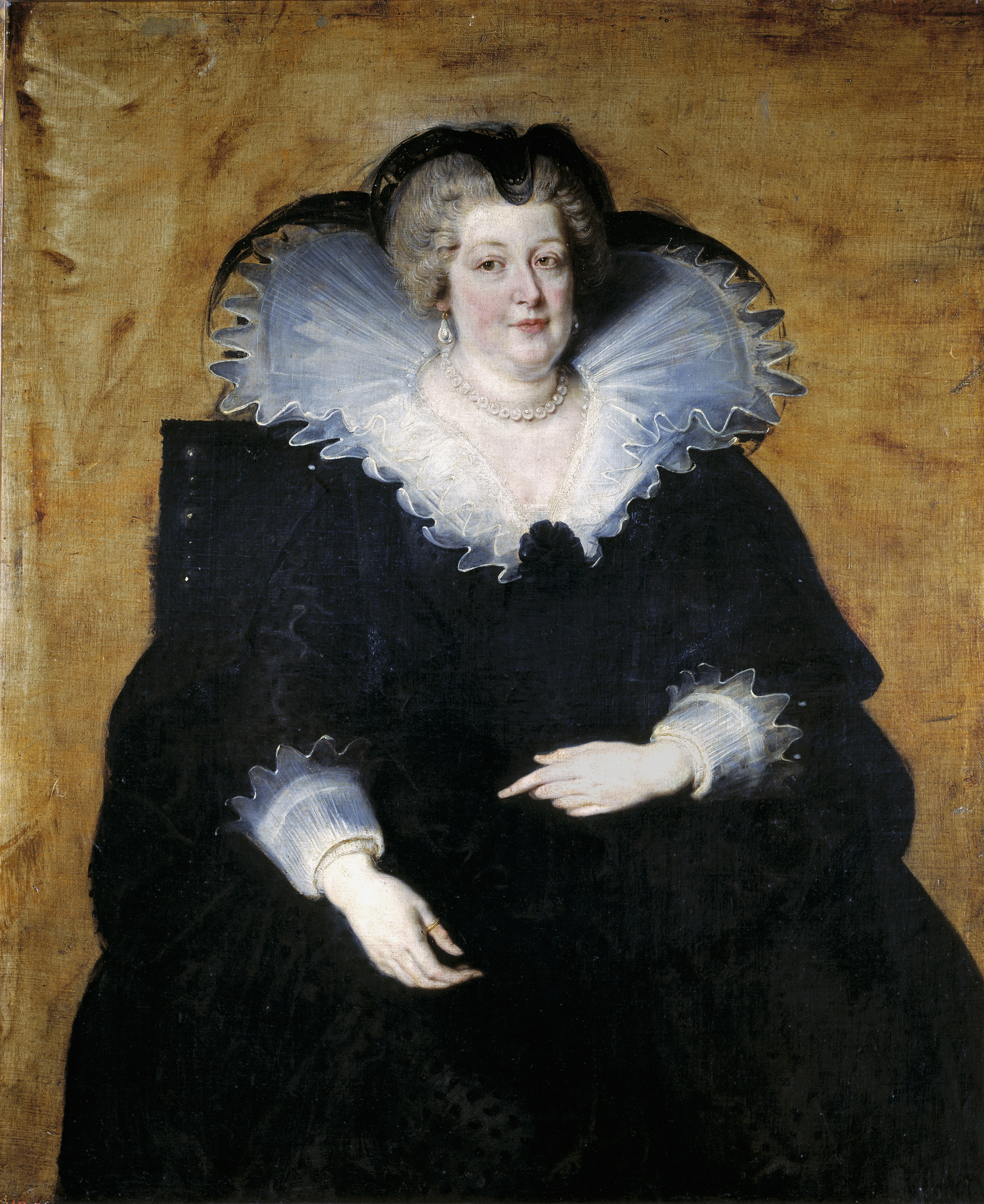
Marie de Médicis, by Peter Paul Rubens, 1622. Museo del Prado.

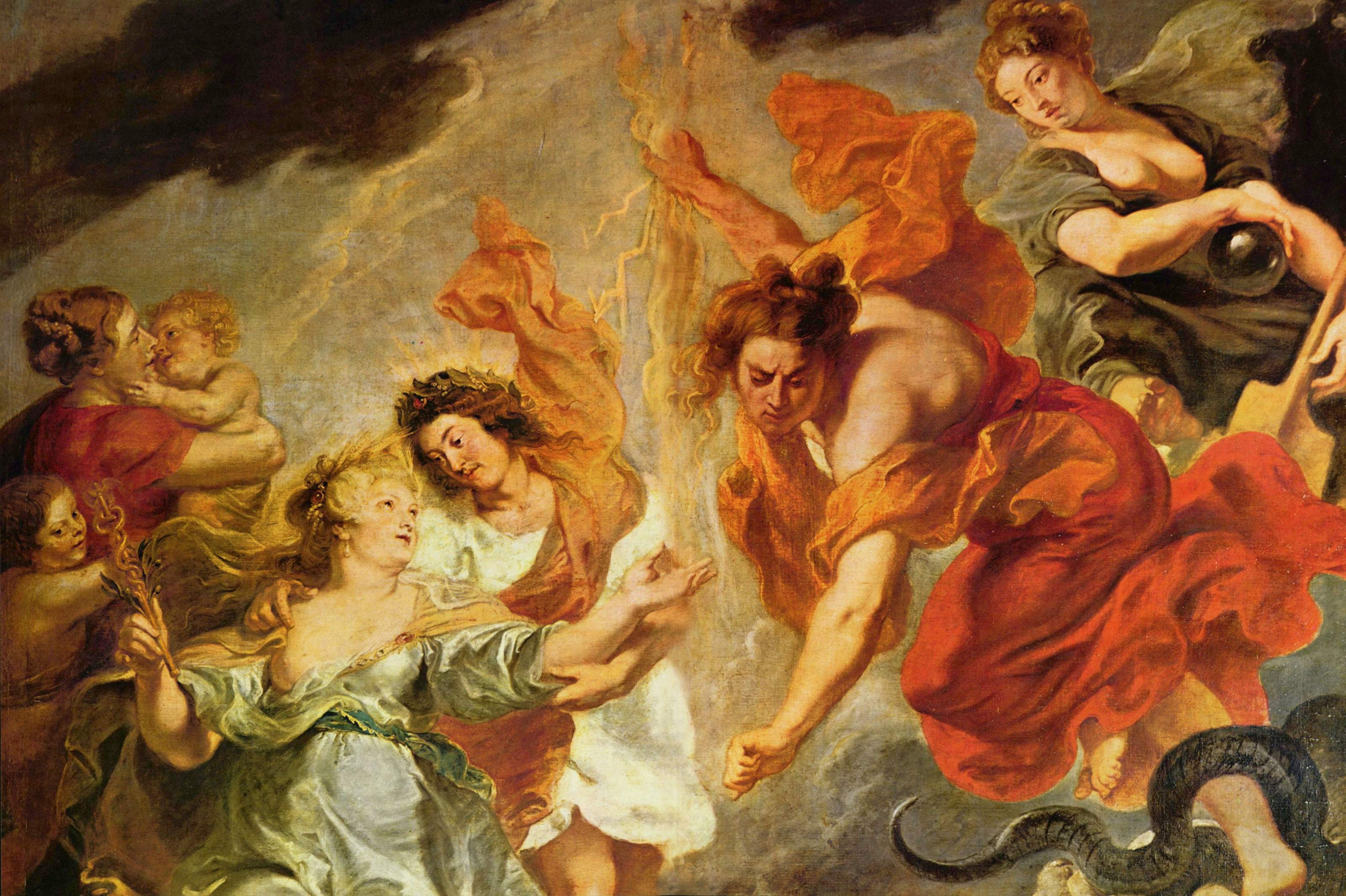
The reconciliation of mother and son, by Peter Paul Rubens, 1622–1625. Louvre Museum.

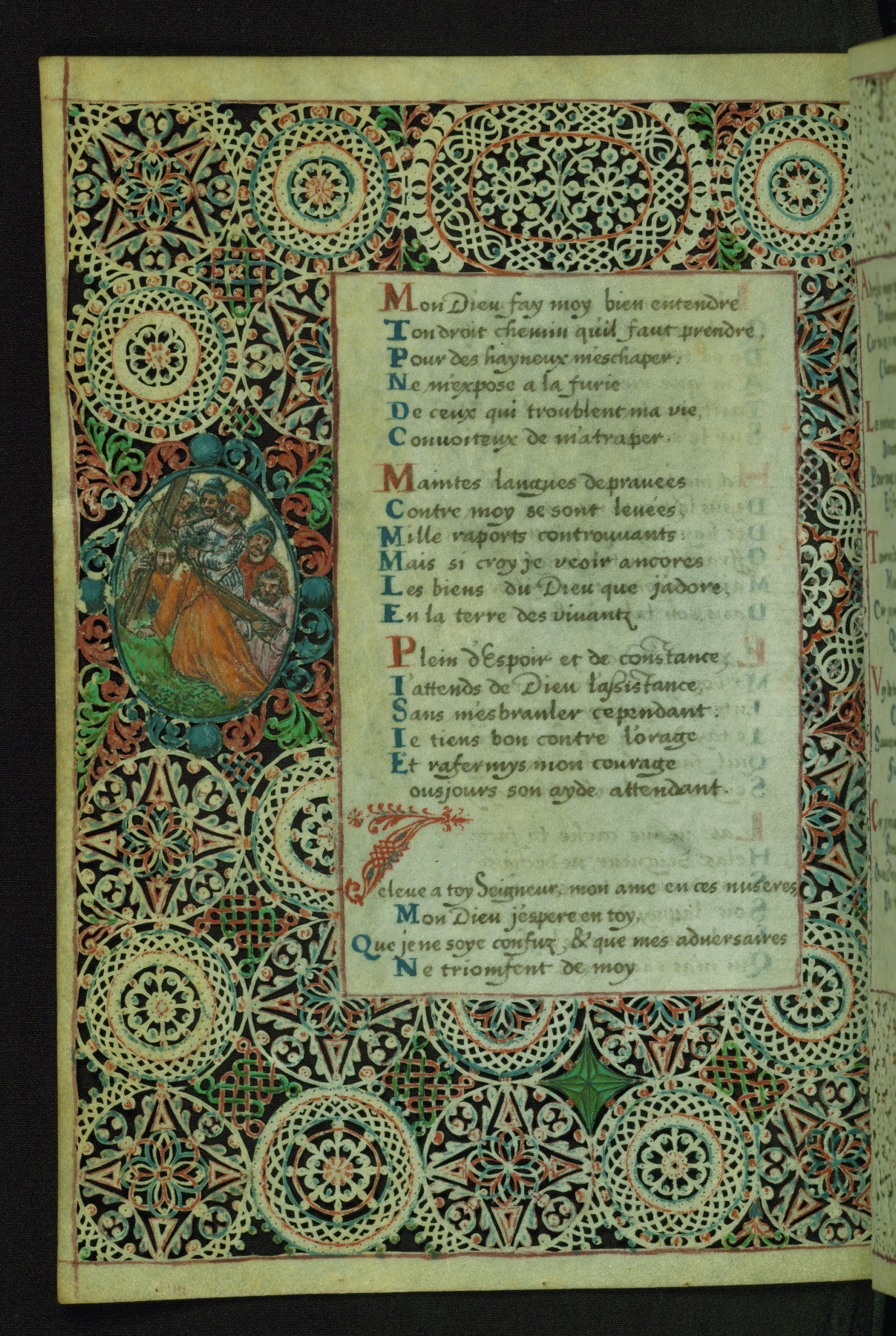
Lace cut parchment page of Marie de Medici's Prayer Book with miniature painting

From the time of her marriage to Henri IV, the Queen practiced ambitious artistic patronage, and placed under her protection several painters, sculptors and scholars. For her apartments at the Palace of Fontainebleau, the Flemish-born painter Ambroise Dubois was recruited to decorate Marie's cabinets with a series of paintings on the theme of the Ethiopics of Heliodorus, and painted for her gallery an important decoration on the theme of Diana and Apollo, mythological evocations of the royal couple. In the Louvre, the Queen had a luxurious apartment on the first floor fitted out, then moved in 1614 to a new apartment on the ground floor, which she had adorned with panels and paintings by Ambroise Dubois, Jacob Bunel, Guillaume Dumée, and Gabriel Honnet on the theme of Jerusalem Delivered of Torquato Tasso (whose translation by Antoine de Nervèze was Marie's first reading in French). The Queen also patronized with portrait painters, such as Charles Martin and especially the Flemish Frans Pourbus the Younger.

During and after the regency, Marie de Médicis played a major role in the development of Parisian artistic life by focusing on the construction and furnishing of the Luxembourg Palace, which she referred to as her "Palais Médicis". The site was purchased in 1612 and construction began in 1615, to designs of Salomon de Brosse. In particular, she tried to attract several large-scale artists to Paris: she brought in The Annunciation by Guido Reni, was offered a suite of Muses painted by Giovanni Baglione, invited the painter Orazio Gentileschi (who stayed in Paris during two years, during 1623–1625), and especially the Flemish painter Peter Paul Rubens, who was commissioned by her to create a 21-piece series glorifying her life and reign to be part of her art collection in the Luxembourg Palace. This series (composed between 1622 and 1625), along with three individual portraits made for Marie and her family, is now known as the "Marie de' Medici cycle" (currently displayed in the Louvre Museum); the cycle uses iconography throughout to depict Henry IV and Marie as Jupiter and Juno and the French state as a female warrior.

The Queen-Mother's attempts to convince Pietro da Cortona and Guercino to travel to Paris ended in failure, but during the 1620s the Luxembourg Palace became one of the most active decorative projects in Europe: sculptors such as Guillaume Berthelot and Christophe Cochet, painters like Jean Monier or the young Philippe de Champaigne, and even Simon Vouet on his return to Paris, participated in the decoration of the apartments of the Queen-Mother.

A parchment Prayer Book belonging to Marie de' Medici has artwork that may date from the 15th century, but is also remarkable for its canivet cuttings. Pages are cut with intricate patterns that are made to look like lace of the period.

=== Conflict with Richelieu, exile and death ===
Marie continued to attend the Conseil du roi by following the advice of Cardinal Richelieu, who she introduced to the King as minister. Over the years, she did not notice the rising power of her protégé; when she realized it, she broke with the Cardinal and sought to oust him. Still not understanding the personality of her son and still believing that it would be easy for her to demand the disgrace of Richelieu from him, she tried to obtain the dismissal of the minister. After the "Day of the Dupes" (Journée des Dupes) of 10–11 November 1630, Richelieu remained the principal minister, and the Queen Mother was constrained to be reconciled with him.

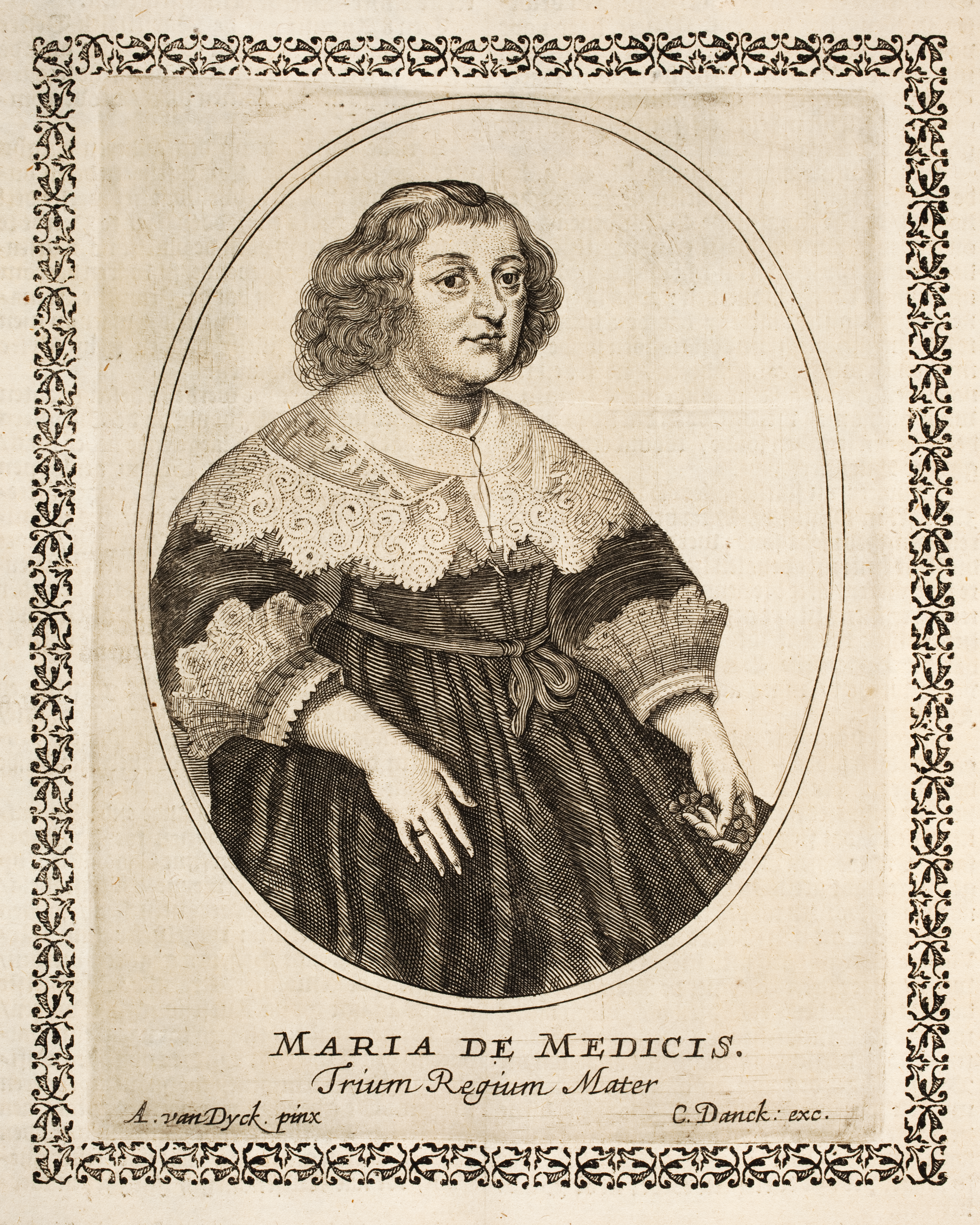
Engraving of Marie de Médicis.

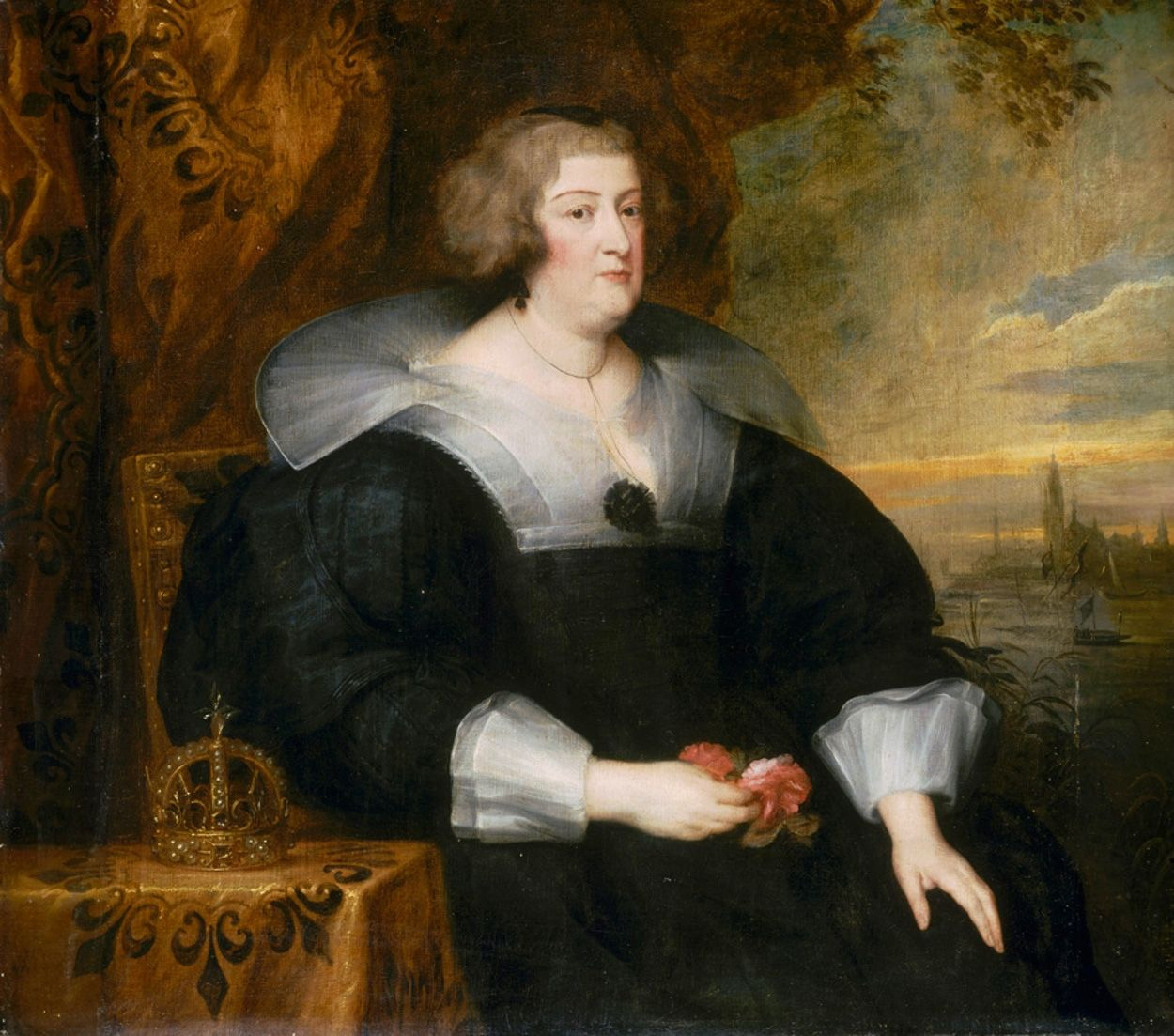
The exiled Queen Marie de Médicis with coronet overlooking Cologne, by Anthony van Dyck. Palais des Beaux-Arts de Lille.

Marie ultimately decided to withdraw from court. Louis XIII, judging his mother too involved in intrigue, encouraged her to retire to the Château de Compiègne. From there, she fled on 19 July 1631 towards the city of Étrœungt (in the County of Hainaut), where she slept before going to Brussels. She intended to plead her case there, but the escape was only a political trap set by her son, who had withdrawn the regiments guarding the Château de Compiègne. Now a refugee with the Spanish, enemies of France, Marie was thus deprived of her pensions.

Her chaplain Mathieu de Morgues, who remained faithful to Marie in his exile, wrote pamphlets against Richelieu that circulated in France clandestinely. During her last years, Marie travelled to various European courts, in the Spanish Netherlands (the ruler of which, Isabella Clara Eugenia, and the ambassador Balthazar Gerbier tried to reconcile her with Richelieu), in England at the court of her daughter Queen Henrietta Maria for three years (staying en route to London in Gidea Hall) and then in Germany; with her daughters and sons-in-law where she tried again to form a "league of sons-in-law" against France, without ever being able to return, and her supporters were imprisoned, banished or condemned to death.

Her visit to Amsterdam was considered a diplomatic triumph by the Dutch, as it lent official recognition to the newly-formed Dutch Republic; accordingly, she was given an elaborate ceremonial royal entry, of the sort the Republic avoided for its own rulers. Spectacular displays (by Claes Corneliszoon Moeyaert) and water pageants took place in the city's harbour in celebration of her visit. There was a procession led by two mounted trumpeters, and a large temporary structure was erected on an artificial island in the Amstel River especially for the festival. The structure was designed to display a series of dramatic tableaux in tribute to her once she set foot on the floating island and entered its pavilion. Afterwards she was offered an Indonesian rice table by the burgomaster, Albert Burgh. He also sold her a famous rosary, captured in Brazil. The visit prompted Caspar Barlaeus to write his Medicea hospes ("The Medicean Guest", 1638).

Marie subsequently traveled to Cologne, where she took refuge in a house loaned by her friend, the painter Rubens. She fell ill in June 1642 and died of a bout of pleurisy in destitution on 3 July, five months before Richelieu. It was not until 8 March 1643 that her body was finally laid to rest in France, in the Basilica of St Denis, The burial was held without much ceremony, and her heart was sent to La Flèche, in accordance with the wish of Henry IV, who wanted their two hearts to be reunited. Her son Louis XIII died on 14 May, only two months after the funeral.

In 1793, during the French Revolution, Queen Marie was dug up by the French revolutionists who threw insults at the remains of the Queen whom they accused of having murdered her husband. Some among them tore out the remaining tufts of her hair still attached to the skull and passed them around. Some of her bones were found floating in muddy water and her remains were thrown into a mass grave along with other French deceased royals. In 1817, Louis XVIII ordered that those royals buried in the mass grave be reburied. That same year, Marie was reburied in the crypt of Basilica of Saint Denis.

== Posthumous appraisal ==
Honoré de Balzac, in his book Sur Catherine de Médicis, encapsulated the Romantic generation's view of Marie de' Medici. She was born and raised in Italy and the French never really accepted her; hence, the negative reviews. However, Henry IV of France was not a rich man and needed Marie's money. The French were still not pleased with him choosing an Italian wife.

Marie de' Medici, all of whose actions were prejudicial to France, has escaped the shame which ought to cover her name. Marie de' Medici wasted the wealth amassed by Henry IV; she never purged herself of the charge of having known of the king's assassination; her intimate was d'Épernon, who did not ward off Ravaillac's blow, and who was proved to have known the murderer personally for a long time. Marie's conduct was such that she forced her son to banish her from France, where she was encouraging her other son, Gaston.

Jules Michelet also contributed to the qualification of Marie de Médicis.

== Issue ==
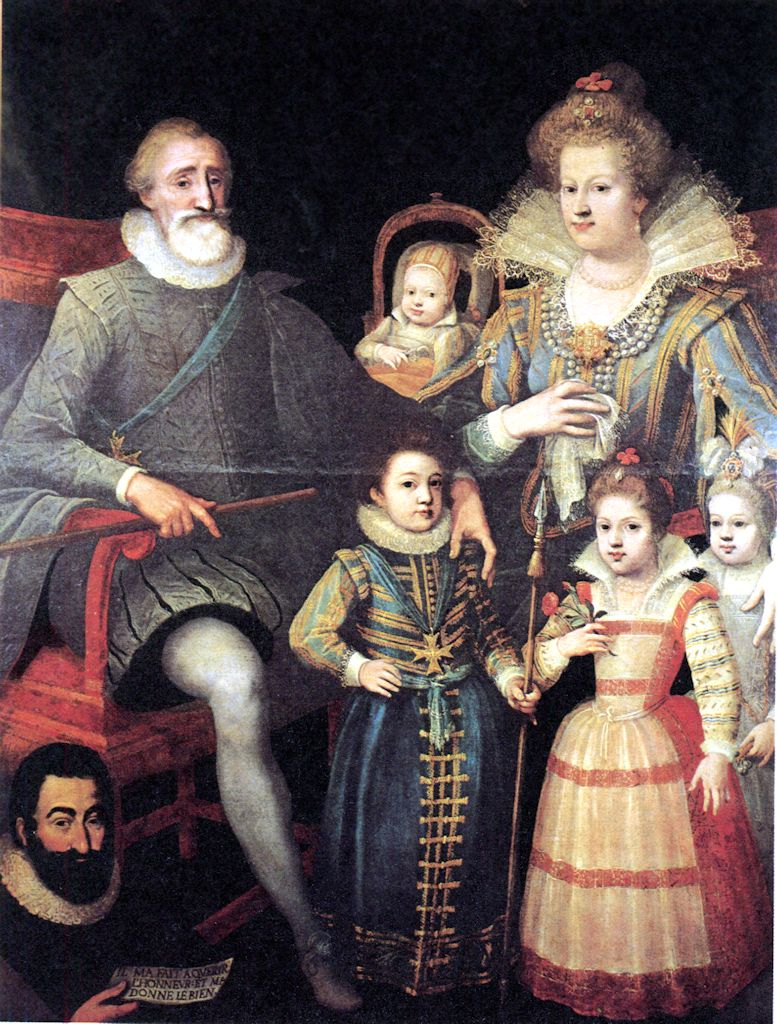
Marie de' Medici and her family (1607; by Frans Pourbus the younger).

Name	Birth	Death	Notes
Louis XIII, King of France	27 September 1601	14 May 1643	Married Anne of Austria (1601–1666) in 1615. Two sons survived to adulthood.
Elisabeth, Queen of Spain	22 November 1602	6 October 1644	Married King Philip IV of Spain (1605–1665) in 1615. A son and a daughter survived to adulthood.
Christine, Duchess of Savoy	10 February 1606	27 December 1663	Married Victor Amadeus I, Duke of Savoy (1587–1637) in 1619. One son and three daughters survived to adulthood.
Monsieur d'Orléans	16 April 1607	17 November 1611	Died without being baptized; named Nicholas or Nicholas-Henry in certain works.
Gaston, Duke of Orléans	25 April 1608	2 February 1660	Married (1) Marie de Bourbon (1605–1627) in 1626. 1 daughter survived to adulthood. Married (2) Marguerite of Lorraine (1615–1672) in 1632. Three daughters survived to adulthood.
Henrietta Maria, Queen of England	25 November 1609	10 September 1669	Married King Charles I of England (1600–1649) in 1625. Three sons and two daughters survived to adulthood.

== See also ==
- Henry IV of France's wives and mistresses
- House of Medici

== Bibliography ==
- Bassani Pacht, Paola (2003). Marie de Médicis : un gouvernement par les arts (in French). Paris: Somogy. ISBN 2-85056-710-8. OCLC 54540822.
- Baudouin-Matuszek, Marie-Noëlle (1991). Marie de Médicis et le Palais du Luxembourg (in French). Paris: Délégation à l'action artistique de la Ville de Paris. ISBN 2-905118-37-7. OCLC 25462248.
- Carmona, Michel (1981). Marie de Médicis (in French). Paris: Fayard. ISBN 2-213-01044-7. OCLC 185443497.
- Chiarini, Marco (2002). "Cosimo II and Maria Maddalena of Austria". The Medici, Michelangelo, & the Art of Late Renaissance Florence. Yale University Press.77
- Delaunay, Mathieu (2005). "Les Ancêtres de Marie de Médicis". Reine de France (in French). Paris: Éditions généalogiques de la Voûte. ISBN 2-84766-253-7.
- Dubost, Jean-François (September 1993). La Prise du pouvoir par Louis XIII (in French). L'Histoire. pp. 28–34.
- Dubost, Jean-François (2011). "L'après Henri IV". Europa Moderna. Revue d'histoire et d'iconologie (in French). 2 (2): 5–14. doi:10.3406/emod.2011.849.
- Dubost, Jean-François (2009). Marie de Médicis, la reine dévoilée. Paris: Payot. ISBN 978-2-228-90393-6. OCLC 318870555. online text 1 online text 2
- Dubost, Jean-François (1997). "La France italienne, XVI-XVII siècle". Aubier histoires (in French). Paris: Aubier Montaigne. ISBN 2-7007-2276-0..
- Duccini, Hélène (1991). Concini, grandeur et misère du favori de Marie de Médicis. Paris: Albin Michel. ISBN 2-226-05265-8..
- Fumaroli, Marc; Graziani, Françoise and Solinas Francesco, Le « Siècle » de Marie de Médicis, actes du séminaire de la chaire rhétorique et société en Europe (xvie-xviie siècles) du Collège de France (in French). Edizioni dell'Orso 2003
- Goldstone, Nancy (2015). The rival queens : Catherine de' Medici, her daughter Marguerite de Valois, and the betrayal that ignited a kingdom. New York: Little, Brown and Company. ISBN 978-0-316-40967-4. OCLC 908108250.
- Hübner, Helga and Regtmeier, Eva (2010), Maria de' Medici: eine Fremde; edition by Dirk Hoeges (in German) (Literatur und Kultur Italiens und Frankreichs; vol. 14). Frankfurt: Peter Lang ISBN 978-3-631-60118-1
- Kermina, Françoise (2010). Marie de Médicis (in French). Paris: Perrin. ISBN 978-2-262-03298-2.
- Mamone, Sara (1990). Paris et Florence: deux capitales du spectacle pour une reine, Marie de Médicis (in Italian). Translated by Sophie Bajard. Paris: Seuil. ISBN 2020122286. OCLC 23128919..
- Thiroux d'Arconville, Marie-Geneviève-Charlotte, Vie de Marie de Médicis, princesse de Toscane, reine de France et de Navarre, 3 vol. in-8°.
- La France de la monarchie absolue, 1610-1715 (in French). Paris: Seuil. 1997.

Marie de' Medici House of Medici Born: 26 April 1575 Died: 3 July 1642
French royalty
Vacant Title last held by Margaret of Valois	Queen consort of France and Navarre; 17 December 1600 – 14 May 1610	Vacant Title next held by Anne of Austria
