= Antonio de' Medici =

Italian noble (1576–1621)

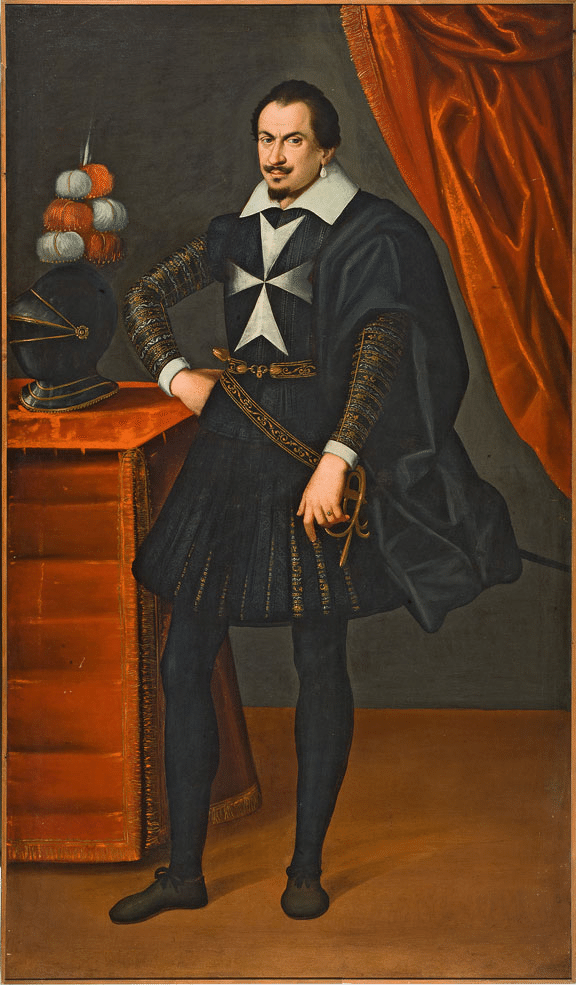
- Portrait of Antonio de' Medici.
- Born: 29 August 1576; Florence, Italy
- Died: 2 May 1621 (aged 44); Florence, Italy
- Spouse: Artemisa Tozzi
- Issue: Paolo de' Medici; Giulio de' Medici; Anton Francesco de' Medici
- House: Medici
- Father: Francesco I de' Medici
- Mother: Bianca Cappello
- Religion: Roman Catholicism

Don Antonio de' Medici (29 August 1576 – 2 May 1621) was the only son of Francesco I de' Medici, Grand Duke of Tuscany and his mistress Bianca Cappello. He was a minor figure at the Grand Ducal Medici court.

== Early life ==
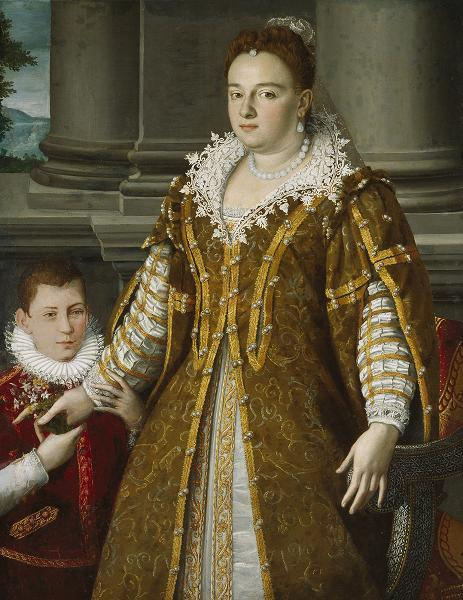
Antonio with his mother Bianca, by Alessandro Allori.

Antonio was born under obscure conditions during the lifetime of Francesco I de' Medici's legitimate consort, who died in childbirth in April 1578. The grand duke secretly married his mistress Bianca Cappello only two months later, before celebrating a public wedding in 1579, after the official mourning period. The very existence of the infant was not publicly acknowledged until he was almost three years old, but from the moment he was brought into the court, he was raised as the legitimate heir to Tuscany. During his father's lifetime no doubts were raised either of his paternity, or of Francesco's intention that he should succeed him. Francesco legitimated Antonio and in 1584 he obtained implicit approval from Philip II of Spain, who was the overlord of Siena, that the legitimated Antonio was to rule. Francesco's younger brother, had been designated for the Church, rising to the rank of Cardinal.

== Later life ==
Within hours of Francesco's death on 18 October 1587, Bianca Cappello was dead, too, poisoned, it was thought, at the direction of the Cardinal, who now set aside his orders and took up rule as Ferdinando de' Medici, Grand Duke of Tuscany. Bianca Cappello had recently undergone a false pregnancy, in 1586, which encouraged Cardinal Ferdinando to create a story that Bianca's pregnancy in 1576 had been a false one, too, and that Antonio was the son of a serving girl who had been smuggled into the bed. As a magnanimous gesture, the former cardinal conferred some substantial property on the youth and induced him to take the clerical habit of the Knights of Malta, which would preclude any further heirs with substantial claims to the Medici inheritance.

Thus at eighteen, Antonio joined the Knights of Malta; he fought the Ottoman Turks in Hungary in 1594-95 and soon contracted syphilis; he served in various ambassadorial capacities, and satisfied his pleasure in the hunt, and in music and theater. His virtuoso interests in alchemy and other scientific concerns, pursued on his property at the Casino Mediceo di San Marco of Florence, brought him into contact with Galileo. His mistress from Lucca presented him with three sons, to the disapproval of the Medici court; but he managed to have them legitimated by Pope Paul V and recognized by Grand Duke Cosimo.

Antonio died in modest retirement in 1621, having withdrawn from the court after 1614.

== Issue ==
He had three sons by his wife, Artemisa Tozzi (born in Lucca), 1590–1643:

- Paolo (1616–1656), a military.
- Giulio (1617–1670), a priest.
- Anton Francesco (1618–1659)

Antonio also had two illegitimate daughters:

- Maria (¿?), a nun at Santissima Annunziata.
- Maddalena (1610-?), daughter of a Bolognese woman. A nun at San Giovannino dei Cavalieri since 1624.
