= Joanna of Austria, Grand Duchess of Tuscany =

Grand Duchess of Tuscany from 1574 to 1578

Joanna of Austria
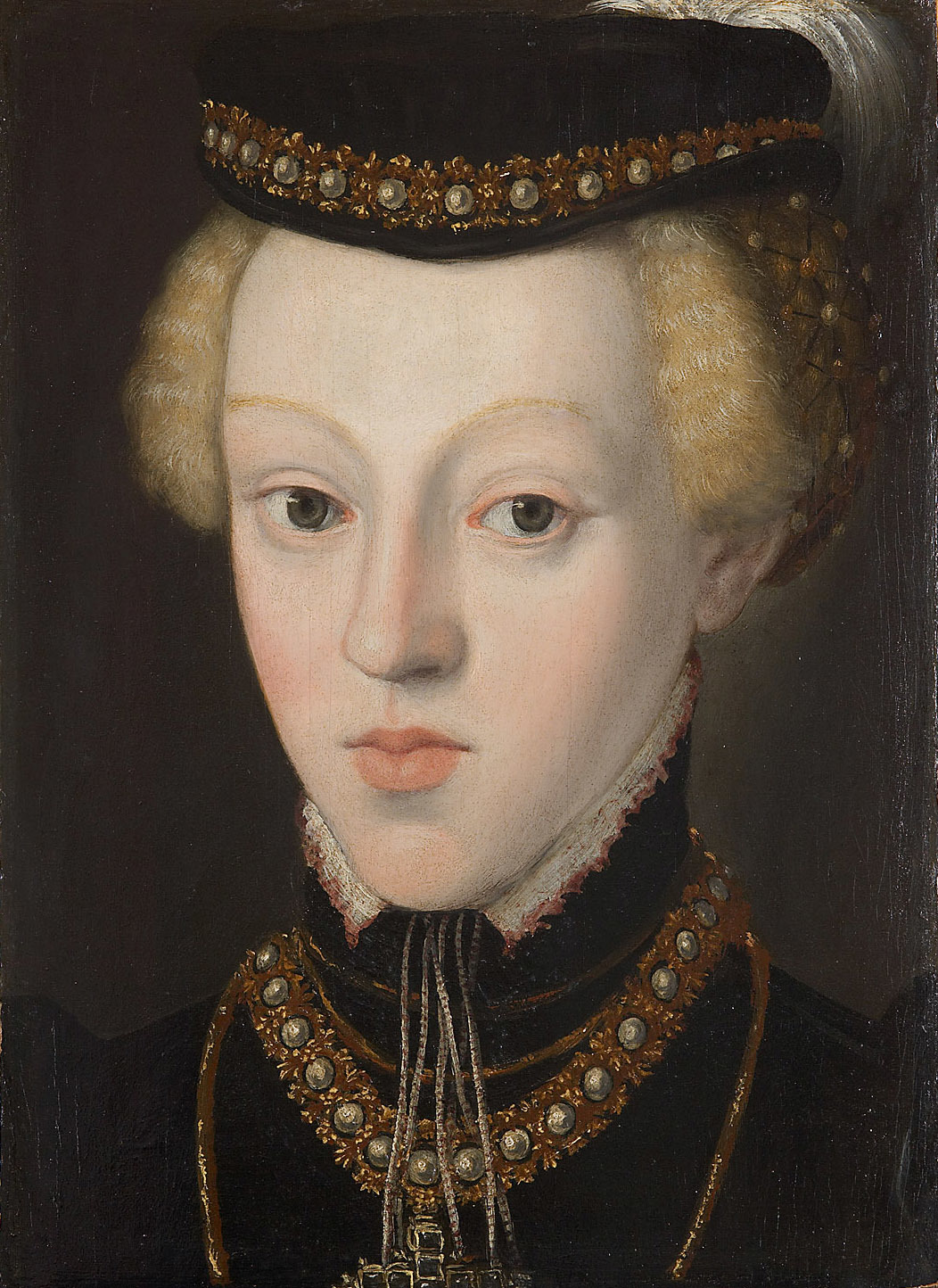
- Portrait by Giuseppe Arcimboldo c. 1562

Grand Duchess consort of Tuscany
- Tenure: 21 April 1574 – 11 April 1578
- Born: 24 January 1547; Prague, Kingdom of Bohemia, Holy Roman Empire
- Died: 11 April 1578 (aged 31); Florence, Grand Duchy of Tuscany
- Burial: Medici Chapel
- Spouse: Francesco I de' Medici
- Issue among others...: Eleanor, Duchess of Mantua and Montferrat; Anna de' Medici; Maria, Queen of France and Navarre; Philip, Grand Prince of Tuscany
- House: Habsburg
- Father: Ferdinand I, Holy Roman Emperor
- Mother: Anna of Bohemia and Hungary

Joanna of Austria (German Johanna von Österreich, Italian Giovanna d'Austria; 24 January 1547 – 11 April 1578) was an Archduchess of Austria. By marriage to Francesco I de' Medici, she was the Grand Princess of Tuscany and later the Grand Duchess of Tuscany. One of her daughters was Marie de' Medici, second wife of King Henry IV of France.

== Early years ==
Joanna was born in Prague, the youngest of 15 children, the youngest daughter of Ferdinand I, Holy Roman Emperor and Anna of Bohemia and Hungary. She never knew her mother and eldest sister as her mother died two days after Joanna's birth and her sister Elisabeth, Queen of Poland, died two years before Joanna was born.

Her paternal grandparents were Philip I of Castile and Joanna of Castile. Her maternal grandparents were King Vladislaus II of Bohemia and Hungary, and Anna of Foix-Candale. Through her father, Joanna was also a descendant of Isabella I of Castile and Mary of Burgundy.

In the winter of 1547, the widowed Emperor Ferdinand I entrusted all his unmarried daughters to the care of nuns in the monastery in Innsbruck. Only once, in 1552, during the invasion of the Tyrol by the Protestant army under the command of Maurice, Elector of Saxony, did Joanna and her sisters Magdalena, Margaret, Barbara and Helena, spend some time outside the monastery at Bruneck Castle.

Joanna received a deeply religious Catholic upbringing. The characteristic features of her education, based on the writings of the Jesuits Peter Canisius and Diego Laynez, were religiosity and charity. Her confessors were also Jesuits.

== Marriage ==
In November 1565, she and her sister Barbara, who was betrothed to marry Alfonso II d'Este, Duke of Ferrara, arrived in Trento, where Pope Pius IV sent his legates to conduct a double marriage ceremony; however, because of the renewed conflict between the grooms, the brides had to go to the respective capitals (Ferrara and Florence) of their future spouses to be wedded.

Her marriage to Francesco I de' Medici, took place on 18 December 1565 in Florence, after she solemnly arrived in the city by the Porta al Prato. On the occasion Cosimo had ordered twelve triumphal arches to be erected each an allegory of victory, religion and joy. Giorgio Vasari and Vincenzo Borghini, with the help of Giovanni Caccini made big festivities to celebrate the wedding. This involved a procession of gods and goddesses alluding to the union between Joanna and Francesco being likened to the wedding of Peleus and Thetis. The party was also taken to the Medici villa in Poggio a Caiano.

Nevertheless, Joanna was homesick and unhappy. Her new husband who was of a taciturn and secretive character was noted to "set little store in virtue" was a womanizer who ignored Joanna and instead occupied himself with his mistress Bianca Cappello. Joanna was also despised by the Florentines for her Austrian hauteur; she never felt at home in Florence. Joanna was however praised for her virtue and honesty by many Florentine scholars.

Her father-in-law, Cosimo I de' Medici, was reasonably kind to Joanna. He had the courtyard of the Palazzo Vecchio specially decorated for her; the lunettes were painted with murals of Austrian towns by pupils of Vasari, and Verrocchio's Putto with Dolphin fountain was brought down from the Careggi villa where it had been set up in the garden by Lorenzo de' Medici.

The position of Joanna in the Florentine court was a difficult one: between 1567 and 1575, she gave birth to six daughters, of whom only three survived infancy. The absence of a male heir to continue the dynasty was the cause of constant conflict with her husband, who preferred the company of his mistress Bianca Cappello, who gave birth to a son, Antonio, in 1576.

Joanna now desperate to give birth to a son, in 1573 made a pilgrimage to Loreto and the Basilica della Santa Casa where she prayed to the Virgin Mary for a son.

Finally, in 1577 Joanna gave birth to the long-awaited heir, baptised Filippo in honour of King Philip II of Spain, Joanna's first cousin. The birth was celebrated with great joy by the court, as now the succession of the grand duchy was secured and any ambitions of Bianca Cappello to have her son Antonio as heir of Tuscany were eliminated. However Filippo was to die young, and Joanna's brother-in-law, Ferdinando, succeeded Francesco as grand duke.

== Death ==
On 10 April 1578, Joanna – heavily pregnant with her eighth child – fell from the stairs at the Palazzo Vecchio in Florence. Some hours later, she prematurely gave birth to a son, who died immediately. She died the next day on 11 April. Francesco subsequently married his mistress, Bianca Cappello, making her grand duchess.

The mysterious circumstances around this accident caused rumours accusing her husband and his mistress of murdering her, so that they could be married. However, modern medical investigation of her remains confirm the official reports of her death as caused by the birth (the child presented arm first, and Joanna suffered a ruptured uterus). Joanna suffered from scoliosis: her spine and pelvis were severely deformed. It is clear from the condition of her pelvis that her previous births had been difficult, and it seems remarkable that she had survived them.

== Issue ==
The eight children of Francesco and Joanna were:

1. Eleonora de' Medici (28 February 1567 – 9 September 1611) married Vincenzo I Gonzaga, Duke of Mantua and had issue.
2. Romola de' Medici (20 November 1568 – 2 December 1568) died in infancy.
3. Anna de' Medici (31 December 1569 – 19 February 1584) died unmarried.
4. Isabella de' Medici (30 September 1571 – 8 August 1572) died in infancy.
5. Lucrezia de' Medici (7 November 1572 – 14 August 1574) died in infancy.
6. Maria de' Medici (26 April 1575 – 3 July 1642) married Henri IV of France and had issue.
7. Filippo de' Medici (20 May 1577 – 29 March 1582) died in childhood.
8. Stillborn son (10 April 1578 – 10 April 1578).

Out of a total of eight children, only two daughters, Eleanora and Maria (Marie) lived to adulthood. The rest of the children died young.

== Ancestry ==
Ancestors of Joanna of Austria, Grand Duchess of Tuscany

8. Maximilian I, Holy Roman Emperor
4. Philip I of Castile
9. Mary, Duchess of Burgundy
2. Ferdinand I, Holy Roman Emperor
10. Ferdinand II of Aragon
5. Joanna I of Castile
11. Isabella I of Castile
1. Joanna of Austria
12. Casimir IV Jagiellon
6. Vladislaus II of Bohemia and Hungary
13. Elisabeth of Austria
3. Anne of Bohemia and Hungary
14. Gaston de Foix, Count of Candale
7. Anne of Foix-Candale
15. Catherine of Foix

== Sources ==
- van Veen, Hendrik Thijs (2013). Cosimo I De' Medici and His Self-Representation in Florentine Art and Culture. Cambridge University Press.

Joanna of Austria House of Habsburg Born: 24 January 1547 Died: 11 April 1578
Italian royalty
Vacant Title last held by Eleanor of Toledo as Duchess of Florence	Grand Duchess consort of Tuscany; 1574–1578	Vacant Title next held by Bianca Cappello
