= Bianca Cappello =

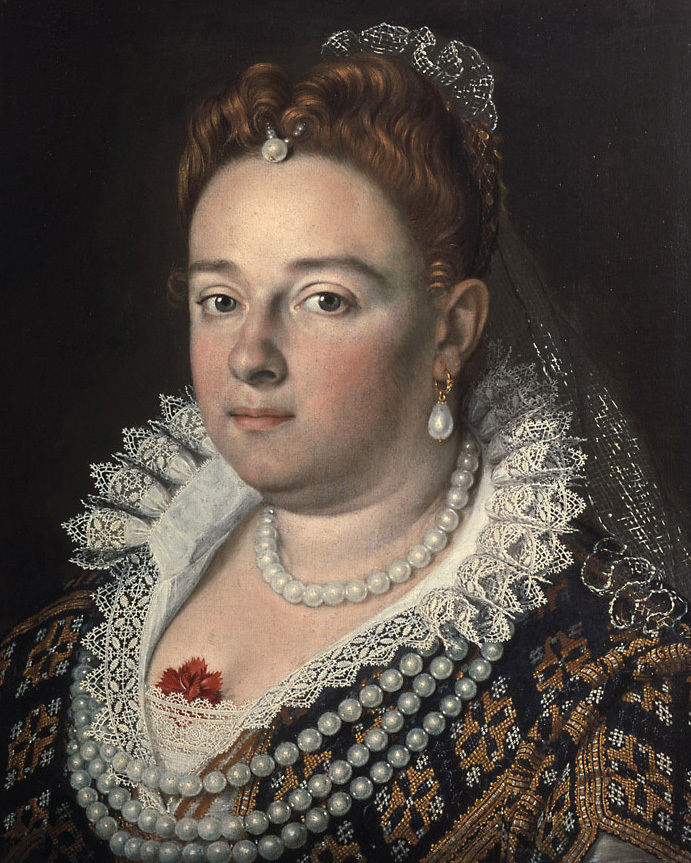
- Portrait of Bianca Cappello by Scipione Pulzone

Grand Duchess consort of Tuscany
- Tenure: 12 June 1579 – 20 October 1587
- Coronation: 12 June 1579
- Born: 1548; Venice, Republic of Venice
- Died: 20 October 1587 (aged 38–39); Poggio a Caiano, Tuscany
- Spouse: Pietro Bonaventuri (m. 1563; died 1572) Francesco I de' Medici (m. 1578; died 1587)
- Issue: Virginia Pellegrina Bonaventuri; Antonio de' Medici
Names
- Bianca Cappello
- House: Cappello; Medici
- Father: Bartolomeo Cappello
- Mother: Pellegrina Morosini

Coat of arms of Bianca Cappello as royal consort, with the Capello's Coat of Arms (the blue and white hat), used in the Venetian nobility.

Bianca Cappello (1548 – 20 October 1587) was an Italian noblewoman, the Grand Duchess consort of Tuscany by marriage to Francesco I de' Medici, Grand Duke of Tuscany. She was Francesco's mistress, who later became his consort when she married him.

== Early life ==
Bianca was born in Venice in 1548 as the second child and only daughter of Venetian nobleman Bartolomeo Cappello (1519-1594) and his wife, Pellegrina Morosini, a member of the Morosini family, one of the richest, noblest, and most powerful Venetian noble families, and was noted for her great beauty. She had an older brother, Vittorio Cappello (b. 1547), who served as Prime Minister of Tuscany (1579-1581).

== First marriage ==
At the age of fifteen she fell in love with Pietro Bonaventuri, a young Florentine clerk in the firm of Salviati family, and on 28 November 1563 escaped with him to Florence, where they were married. In 1564 she had a daughter named Virginia, or, according to other sources, Pellegrina. The Venetian government made every effort to have Bianca arrested and brought back but the Grand Duke Cosimo I intervened in her favour and she was left unmolested.

However, she did not get on well with her husband's family, who, although noble, were very much impoverished and made her do menial work, until at last her beauty attracted Grand Prince Francesco, son and heir apparent of the grand duke.

== Mistress of Francesco ==
Although already married to Joanna of Austria, Francesco seduced Bianca and gave her jewels, money and other presents. Bonaventuri, Bianca's husband, was given court employment and consoled himself with other ladies until, in 1572, he was murdered in the streets of Florence in consequence of some amorous intrigue. It is possible that Bianca and Francesco were involved.

On the death of Cosimo in 1574 Francesco succeeded to the grand duchy; he now installed Bianca in a palace (now known as Palazzo di Bianca Cappello) close to his own and outraged his wife by flaunting his mistress before her. At this point, Francesco had no legitimate son to inherit the duchy; a child by Bianca, though illegitimate, would be a potential heir, and by extension would secure Bianca's own position. In 1576 she duly gave birth to Don Antonio de' Medici (d. 1621), but his father, still hoping to have a legitimate son by his wife, refused to acknowledge him. Francesco and Joanna then produced a son, Grand Prince Philip de' Medici, in 1577; the child survived the perilous months of early infancy, and Bianca's hopes of being anything more than a favoured mistress seemed dashed.

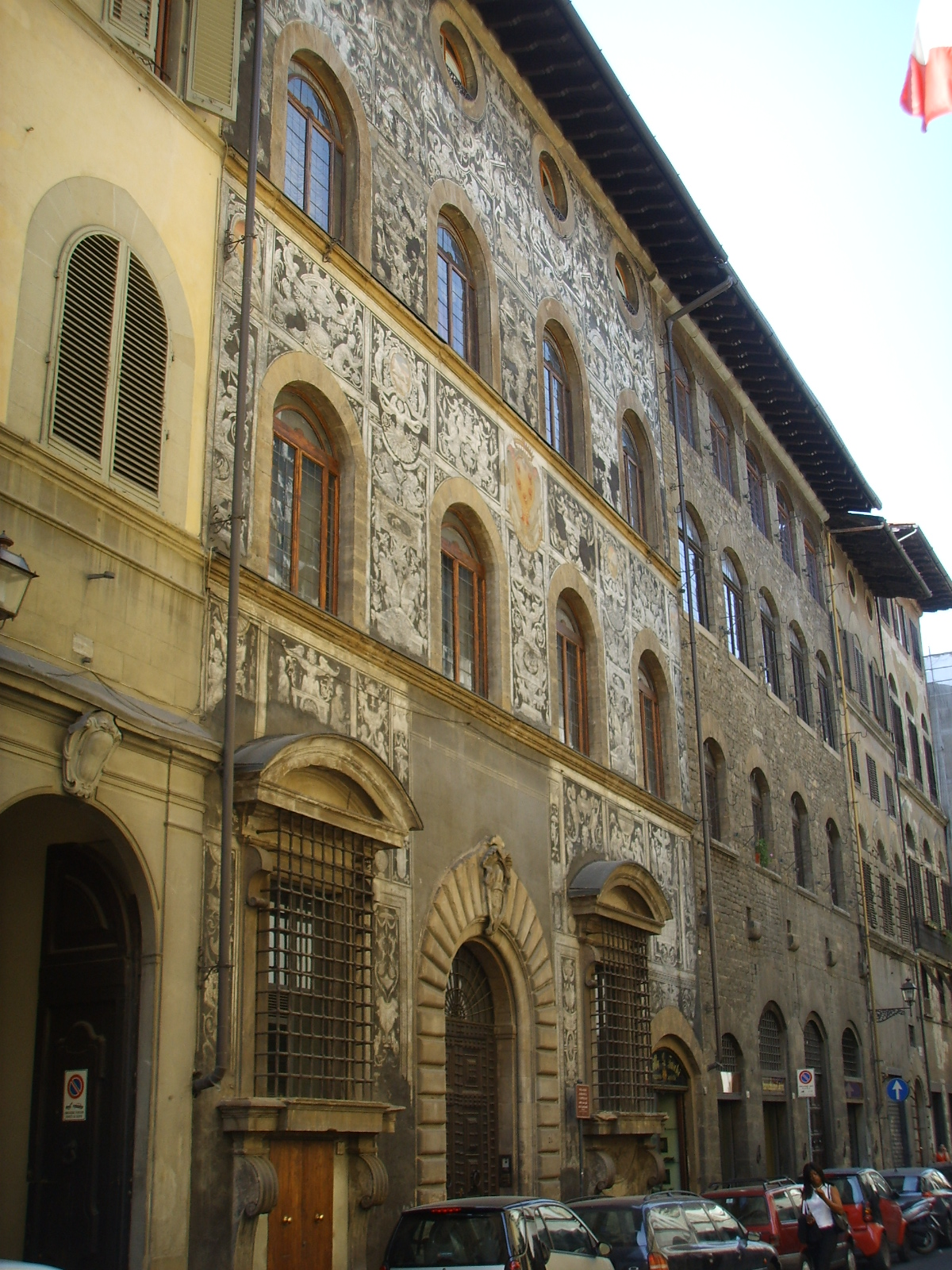
Palazzo di Bianca Cappello in Florence, Italy

== Grand Duchess consort of Tuscany ==
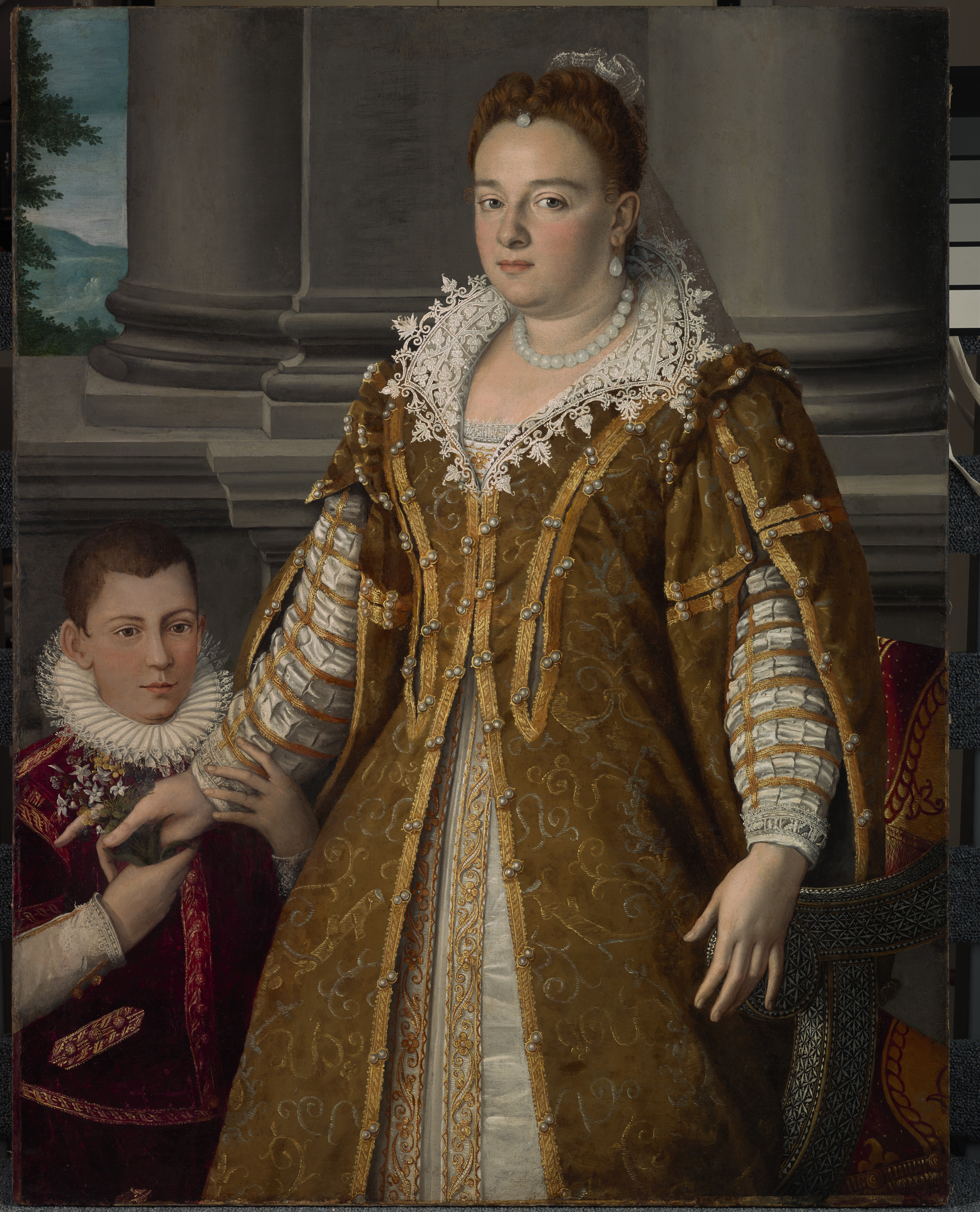
Portrait of Bianca Cappello with her son Antonio de' Medici by Alessandro Allori

In 1578, Joanna died; a few months later Francesco secretly married Bianca, and on 10 June 1579, the marriage was publicly announced, and Antonio acknowledged as the Duke's son. Two days later, on 12 June, Bianca was crowned the Grand Duchess of Tuscany at the Palazzo Vecchio in Florence. The Venetian government now put aside its resentment and was officially represented at the magnificent wedding festivities, for it saw in Bianca Cappello an instrument for cementing good relations with Tuscany.

Bianca's position, however, was still not secure. The heir remained the young Grand Prince Philip; her own son by Francesco, though acknowledged, remained illegitimate, barred from inheriting the duchy. There would be no more children born of the relationship, and Bianca was aware that, if her husband were to die before her, she was lost, for his family, especially his brother Cardinal Ferdinand, hated her bitterly as an adventuress and interloper.

In 1582, however, Grand Prince Philip died. Francesco immediately began working on securing the succession for his remaining son, Antonio, having him legitimated and declared heir apparent, with the support of Philip II of Spain. As the mother of the heir, Bianca's position was far stronger: even if Francesco died before Antonio reached adulthood, Bianca would have a good claim to ruling as regent on her son's behalf, and her husband's family would give her more respect as the mother of the heir.

During the visit of the Tenshō embassy to court one of its members received Biancas portrait, which he wanted to bring with him back to Japan as to show "the [Japanese] women how much these women here exceed them in beauty and style."

Francesco and Bianca died at the Villa Medici on 19 and 20 October 1587, possibly poisoned, or, much more probably, from malarial fever. As Bianca wasn't an official member of the Medici family, Cardinal Ferdinand did not allow her to be buried in the Medici family tombs. Instead, some believe that Bianca was buried in an unmarked mass grave under the church of St. Lorenzo, having been brought back to Florence from Poggio a Caiano. In 2006, forensic and toxicology experts at the University of Florence reported evidence of arsenic poisoning in a study published in the British Medical Journal, but in 2010 evidence of the parasite Plasmodium falciparum, which causes malaria, was found in Francesco's remains.

== Legacy ==
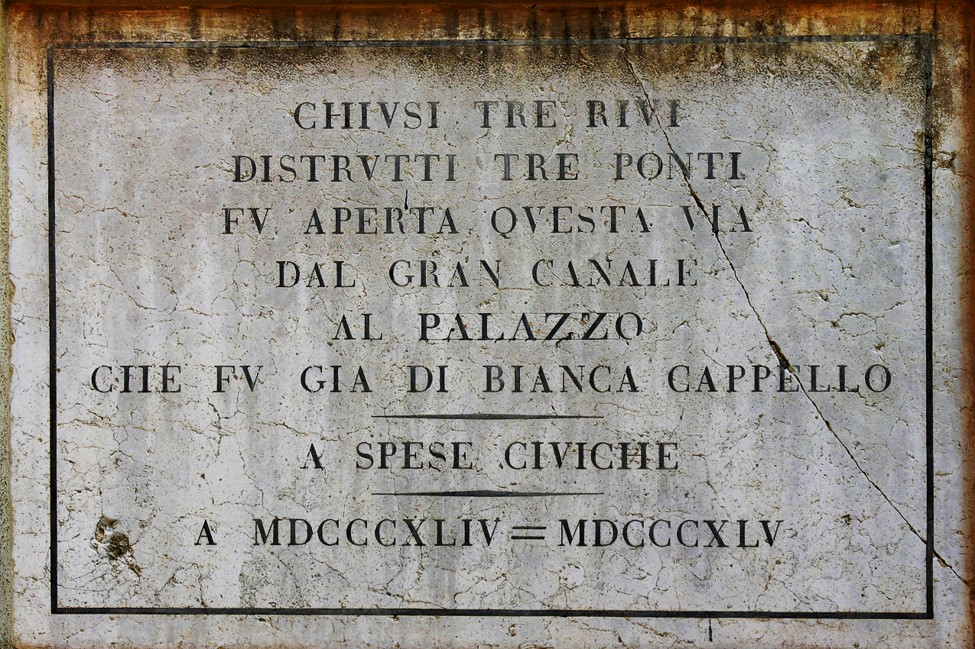
Plaque in Venice for Bianca Cappello

A modified version of the story of Bianca Cappello served as the basis of the theatrical tragedy Women Beware Women by Thomas Middleton, which debuted circa 1621, thirty-four years after the death of Bianca Cappello (whose name Middleton rendered as Bianca Capella). Bianca Cappello has since had occasional literary incarnations, serving as the focal character of the novels Bianca Cappello: an historical romance (1843) by Rosina Bulwer Lytton, Bianca Cappello: a tragedy (1873) by Elizabeth C. Kinney, and Bianca (1992) by Robert Elegant. Bianca Cappello, portrayed by Margaret Rawlings, was also the focal character of the Clifford Bax play The Venetian which in 1931 debuted on the West End stage and - subsequent to a tryout engagement in Chicago - made a short-lived transfer to Broadway. Coincidentally, the creation of the fortunate term serendipity by the writer Horace Walpole is due to a portrait of Bianca.

== Sources ==
- James Chater, "Bianca Cappello and Music", in Renaissance Studies in Honor of Craig Hugh Smyth (Florence, 1985), vol. i, 569–79
- Samuele Romanin, Lezioni di storia Veneta, vol. ii (Florence, 1875)
- G. E. Saltini, Tragedie Medicee domestiche (Florence, 1898)
- Saltini, Della morte di Francesco de' Medici e di Bianca Cappello (Florence, 1863)
- Elizabeth Clementine Stedman, Bianca Capello, A Tragedy (1873)
- Steegman, Bianca Cappello (Baltimore, 1913)
- Rosina Wheeler Bulwer-Lytton Lytton (2010) Bianca Cappello: An Historical Romance Nabu Press ISBN 978-1144883667

Bianco Cappello House of Cappello Died: 17 October 1587
Italian royalty
Vacant Title last held by Joanna of Austria	Grand Duchess of Tuscany; 1579–1587	Vacant Title next held by Christina of Lorraine
