= Francesco I de' Medici =

Grand Duke of Tuscany from 1574 to 1587

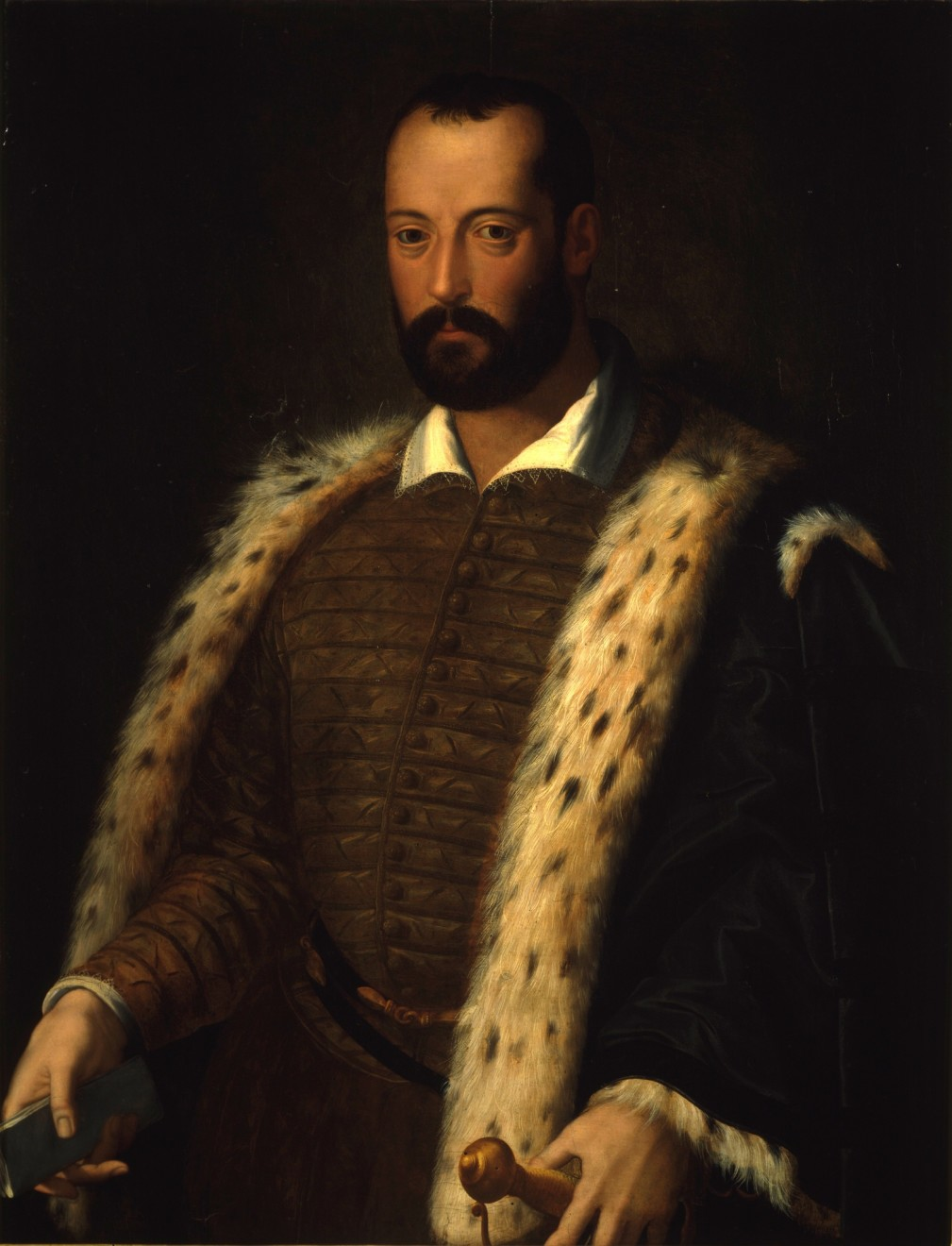
- Portrait by Alessandro Allori, c. 1580-1585

Grand Duke of Tuscany
- Reign: 21 April 1574 – 19 October 1587
- Predecessor: Cosimo I
- Successor: Ferdinando I
- Born: 25 March 1541; Florence, Duchy of Florence
- Died: 19 October 1587 (aged 46); Medici Villa in Poggio a Caiano, Grand Duchy of Tuscany
- Burial: Cappella dei Principi
- Spouse: Joanna of Austria (m. 1565; died 1578) Bianca Cappello (m. 1578)
- Issue among others...: Eleanor, Duchess of Mantua and Montferrat; Anna de' Medici; Maria, Queen of France; Philip, Grand Prince of Tuscany; Don Antonio de' Medici (ill.)
- House: Medici
- Father: Cosimo I
- Mother: Eleanor of Toledo
- Religion: Roman Catholicism

Francesco I (25 March 1541 – 19 October 1587) was the second Grand Duke of Tuscany, ruling from 1574 until his death in 1587. He was a member of the House of Medici.

== Biography ==
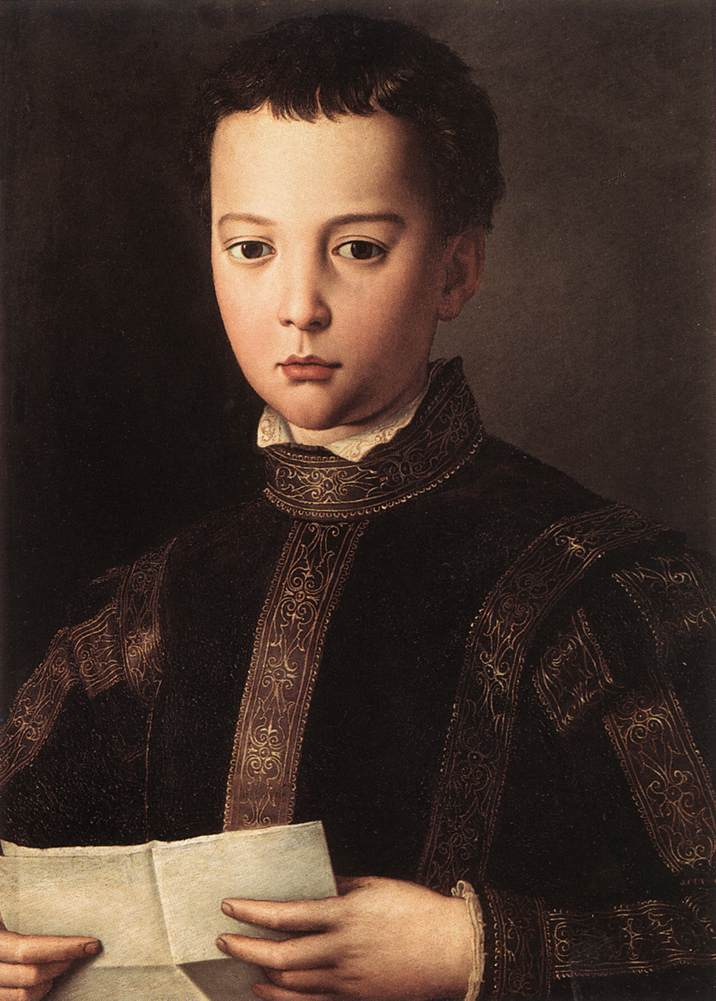
Francesco I of Tuscany as a young boy, painted by Bronzino.

Born in Florence, Francesco was the son of Cosimo I de' Medici, Grand Duke of Tuscany, and Eleanor of Toledo. He served as regent for his father Cosimo after he retired from his governing duties in 1564.

=== Marriage to Joanna of Austria ===
On 18 December 1565, Francesco married Archduchess Joanna of Austria, youngest daughter of Ferdinand I, Holy Roman Emperor and his wife Anne of Bohemia and Hungary. By all reports, it was not a happy marriage. Joanna was homesick for her native Austria, and Francesco was neither charming nor faithful. In 1578, Joanna died at the age of thirty-one, after falling down a flight of stairs while pregnant with their eighth child.

=== Marriage to Bianca Cappello ===
Soon after Grand Duchess Joanna had died, Francesco went on to marry his Venetian mistress, Bianca Cappello, after aptly disposing of her husband, a Florentine bureaucrat. Because of the quick remarriage and similar occurrences among the Medici (Francesco's younger brother Pietro had reportedly killed his wife), rumours spread that Francesco and Bianca had conspired to poison Joanna. Francesco reportedly built and decorated the Villa di Pratolino for Bianca. She was, however, not always popular among Florentines. They had no legitimate children, but Bianca had borne him a son, Antonio (29 August 1576 – 2 May 1621), in his first wife's lifetime. Following the death of Francesco's legitimate son Filippo in 1582, Antonio was proclaimed heir. Francesco also adopted Bianca's daughter by her first marriage, Pellegrina (1564–?).

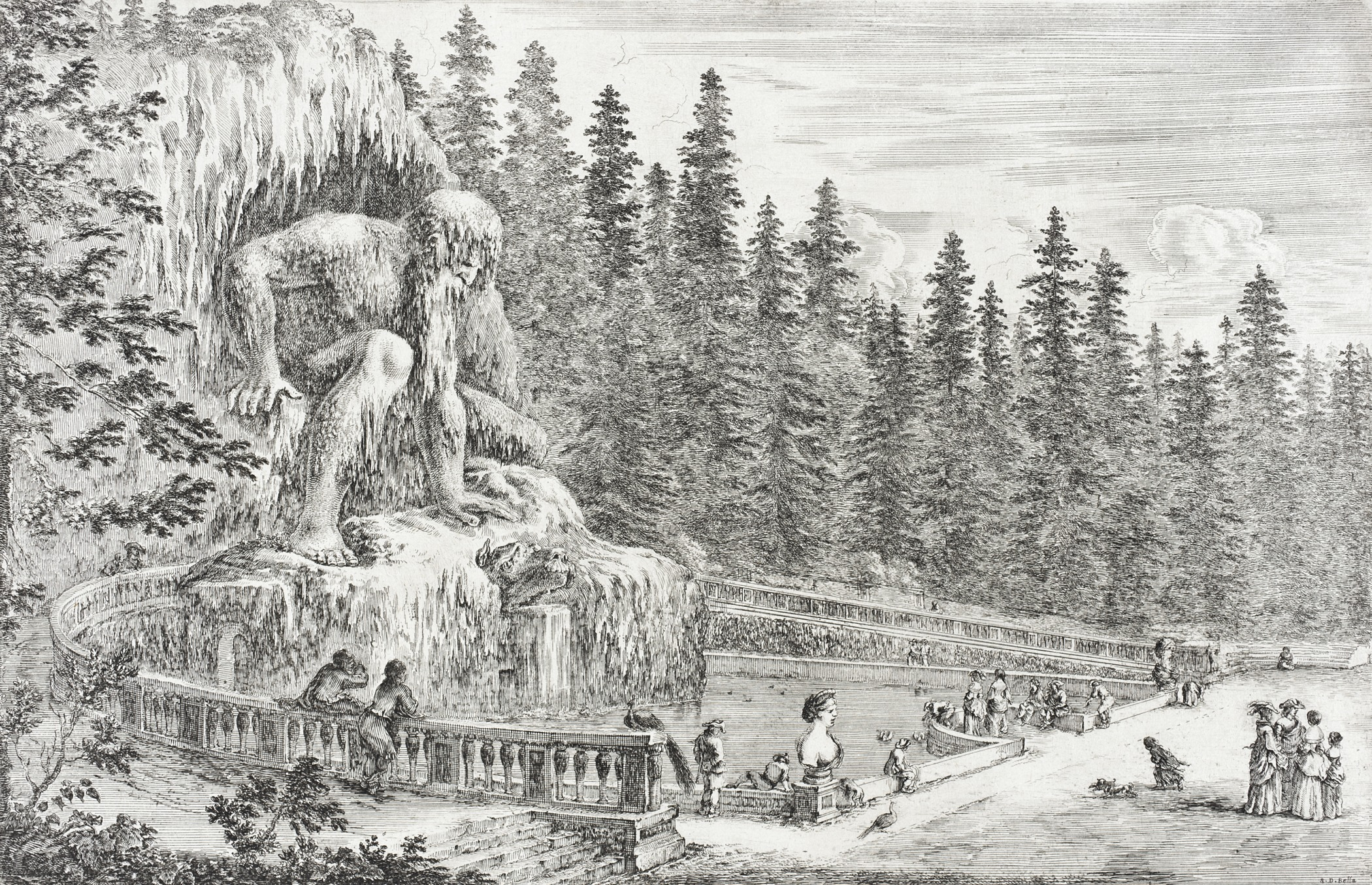
The "Apennine Colossus" in its niche

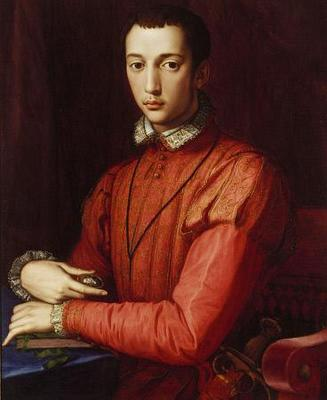
Francesco as a young man in a painting attributed to Alessandro Allori.

=== Statesmanship ===
Like his father, Francesco was often despotic, but while Cosimo had known how to maintain Florentine independence, Francesco acted more like a vassal of the Habsburgs of Austria and Spain. He continued the heavy taxation of his subjects to pay large sums to the emperor.

Francesco had an avid interest in manufacturing and sciences. He founded porcelain and stoneware manufacture, but these did not thrive until after his death. He continued his father's patronage of the arts, supporting artists and building the Medici Theater as well as founding the Accademia della Crusca. Francesco was also passionately interested in chemistry and alchemy and spent many hours in his private laboratory and curio collection, the Studiolo in the Palazzo Vecchio, which held his collections of natural items and stones and allowed him to dabble in chemistry and alchemical schemes.

=== Death ===
Francesco and Bianca died on 19 and 20 October, both at the Medici Villa in Poggio a Caiano. Although the original death certificates mention malaria, it has been widely speculated that the couple was poisoned, possibly by Francesco's brother Ferdinando. While some early forensic research supported the latter theory, forensic evidence from a study in 2010 found the parasite Plasmodium falciparum, which causes malaria, in the skeletal remains of Francesco I, which strongly bolstered the infection theory and the credibility of the official documents. A newer study, in 2026, found the DNA of Plasmodium falciparum, and also the DNA of Plasmodium malariae in the bone remains of Francesco, confirming malaria as his cause of death. Francesco was succeeded by his younger brother Ferdinando.

There is a famous portrait of Francesco as a child by Bronzino that hangs in the Uffizi Gallery in Florence. Francesco's marriage to Bianca and the couple's death was exploited by Thomas Middleton for his tragedy Women Beware Women, published in 1658.

== Children ==
Francesco and Joanna had:

1. Eleonora (28 February 1567 – 9 September 1611), who married Vincenzo Gonzaga, Duke of Mantua (1562–1612)
2. Romola (20 November 1568 – 2 December 1568)
3. Anna (31 December 1569 – 19 February 1584)
4. Isabella (30 September 1571 – 8 August 1572)
5. Lucrezia (7 November 1572 – 14 August 1574)
6. Marie (26 April 1575–3 July 1642), who became Queen of France by her marriage to Henry IV in 1600
7. Filippo (20 May 1577 – 29 March 1582)
8. a son, died in a miscarriage

== In fiction ==
- Francesco de' Medici is a secondary character in John Webster's 1612 play The White Devil.

== Sources ==
- Arba, F; Inzitari, D; Barnett, HJ; Lippi, D (2012). "Stroke in Renaissance time: The case of Francesco I de' Medici". Cerebrovascular Diseases. 33 (6). Elsevier: 589–593. doi:10.1159/000338667. PMID 22699046. S2CID 19949701.
- Beem, Charles (2020). Queenship in Early Modern Europe. Bloomsbury Publishing.
- Boltanski, Ariane (2006). Les Ducs de Nevers et L'etat Royal: Genese d'un compromis (ca 1550 - ca 1600) (in French). Librairie Droz S.A.
- Campbell, Katie (2021). Cultivating the Renaissance: A Social History of the Medici Tuscan Villas. Routledge.
- Fornaciari, Gino; Giuffra, Valentina; Ferroglio, Ezio; Bianucci, Raffaella (2010). Mathiasen, Helle (ed.). "Malaria Was "the Killer" of Francesco I de' Medici (1531-1587)" (PDF). The American Journal of Medicine. 123 (6). Elsevier: 568–569. doi:10.1016/j.amjmed.2009.12.020. PMID 20569768. Archived from the original (PDF) on 29 July 2010.
- Henderson, Paula (2022). "Gardens". In Griffey, Erin (ed.). Early Modern Court Culture. Routledge.
- Lorenzi, Rosella (2010). "Medici Family Cold Case Finally Solved : Discovery News". News.discovery.com. Archived from the original on 27 February 2011.
- Mari, Francesco; Polettini, Aldo; Lippi, Donatella; Bertol, Elisabetta (2006). "The mysterious death of Francesco I de' Medici and Bianca Cappello: an arsenic murder?". BMJ: British Medical Journal. 333 (23–30 June 2006). BMJ: 1299–1301. doi:10.1136/bmj.38996.682234.AE. PMC 1761188. PMID 17185715.
- van Veen, Hendrik Thijs (2013). Cosimo I De' Medici and His Self-Representation in Florentine Art and Culture. Cambridge University Press.
- Vogt-Lüerssen, Maike (2008). "Das Identifikationsporträt der florentinischen Prinzessin Anna di Francesco I. de' Medici (1569-1584)" (PDF). Medicea (in German) (1). Centro Di della Edifimi srl.

Regnal titles
Preceded by Cosimo I de' Medici	Grand Duke of Tuscany; 1574–1587	Succeeded by Ferdinando I de' Medici
