= Anna de' Medici (1569–1584) =

Tuscan princess (1569–1584)

- Princess of Tuscany
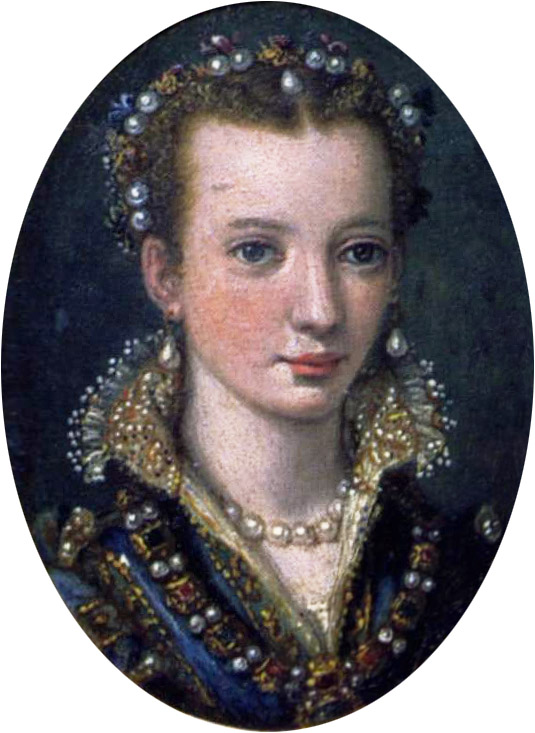
- Anna de' Medici
- Born: 31 December 1569
- Died: 19 February 1584 (aged 14)
- Noble family: Medici
- Father: Francesco I de' Medici, Grand Duke of Tuscany
- Mother: Joanna of Austria

Anna de' Medici (31 December 1569 – 19 February 1584) was the third child of Francesco I de' Medici, Grand Duke of Tuscany, and Joanna of Austria. She was a member of the famous House of Medici.

== Life ==
Anna was the third child of Grand Duke Francesco and Archduchess Joanna. She had two surviving sisters, Eleanor, Duchess of Mantua, and Marie, Queen of France.

Francesco betrothed Anna in 1578 to Charles, Margrave of Burgau, son of Ferdinand II, Archduke of Austria (a brother of her mother). A portrait of Anna was sent to the Archduke. Anna's father even asked permission in 1579 for the marriage from Philip II of Spain, who was one of the most powerful rulers of the time. But the negotiations were called off and the marriage did not go ahead. It is possible that after the failed negotiations, Francesco set up further ones for a marriage for Anna to Charles Emmanuel I, Duke of Savoy, but these negotiations were also called off, and Charles Emmanuel was soon married to Infanta Catherine Michelle of Spain, daughter of King Philip.

Anna soon became sickly and was dying. On 19 February 1584, her sister Eleanor sent a letter to their father on Anna's behalf requesting him to come and visit her before she died. Anna died that same day, aged only fourteen.

== Sources ==
- Vogt-Lüerssen, Maike (2008). "Das Identifikationsporträt der florentinischen Prinzessin Anna di Francesco I. de' Medici (1569-1584)" (PDF). Medicea (in German) (1). Centro Di della Edifimi srl.
